= Feast of the Blessed Sacrament =

Portuguese cultural festival held in Massachusetts

- Genre: Festival
- Frequency: Annually; every first weekend in August
- Venue: Madeira Field
- Locations: New Bedford, Massachusetts
- Country: United States
- Years active: 111
- Previous event: July 30 - August 2, 2026
- Next event: July 29 - August 1, 2027

The Feast of the Blessed Sacrament (Portuguese: Festa do Santíssimo Sacramento) is an annual four-day Portuguese cultural festival held at Madeira Field in New Bedford, Massachusetts. It occurs every first weekend in August, and is recognized as the largest festival of Portuguese culture in the world and the United States, as well as the largest ethnic festival in New England. It is organized by the Clube Madeirense S.S. Sacramento.

== History ==
The festival was founded in 1915 by four immigrants from Madeira, both to recreate religious festivals from their homeland and to celebrate their safe arrival in the United States.

In 1998, the Clube Madeirense S.S. Sacramento, which organizes the festival, altered its bylaws to allow the sons of Madeiran mothers to serve on feast and club committees; previously, only Madeiran-born adult males and their male descendants were allowed to serve on those committees. Despite its religious origins, the name being a reference to the Catholic Eucharist, it is not strictly a religious festival.

In April 2023, the Clube Madeirense S.S. Sacramento altered its bylaws to allow women to serve on the committees.

== Traditions ==
A traditional Mass is held in honor of the Blessed Sacrament at Our Lady of Immaculate Conception Church, but most people come for the parade, live music, folk dancing, kids activities, amusement park rides, and food and drink. The Feast also has Madeira wine imported in casks from Madeira through an agreement with the Madeiran government.

=== Food ===
Escabeche de atum, carne de espeto, linguiça, bacalhau and carne de vinha d'alhos are some of the popular dishes sold at the festival.
