= Casa da Saudade =

Public library in New Bedford, Massachusetts

- 41°37′18″N 70°55′37″W
- Location: 58 Crapo Street, New Bedford, Massachusetts, US
- Scope: Portuguese-language material
- Established: April 25, 1971
- Branch of: New Bedford Free Public Library

Other information
- Website: www.newbedford-ma.gov/library/locations/casa-da-saudade-library/

Casa da Saudade (lit. 'House of Saudade'), or simply Casa, is a public library located at 58 Crapo Street in New Bedford, Massachusetts, United States. Casa da Saudade is the only Portuguese-centered public library in the United States. The library avoided closure in 2025 amidst city budget cuts but has been operating with reduced hours since that time.

== History ==
Casa da Saudade was inaugurated on 25 April 1971 at a storefront on Rivet Street in New Bedford with a collection of 3,000 titles and support from a federal grant. In 1975, Casa moved to its current location at the Sister Aurora Avelar Community Center on 58 Crapo Street. Casa is a branch of the New Bedford Free Public Library.

In 2000, senator Ted Kennedy presented New Bedford with a $500,000 grant to establish a Portuguese cultural center at the Casa da Saudade. While mayor Frederick Kalisz's administration intended to use the money to relocate and expand Casa to create a Portuguese-American Cultural Center, mayor Scott W. Lang instead used the funds to remodel the community center that the library is housed in.

In 2025, Casa da Saudade was faced with potential closure due to budget cuts. The announcement drew strong pushback from the region's Lusophone community, including Massachusetts representative Antonio Cabral. Prior to 2025, Casa da Saudade's hours were reduced from 40 to 32 hours a week as it was the lowest visited public library in New Bedford. Rather than closure, the library's hours were reduced to 24 hours a week.

=== Community impact ===
Casa da Saudade has been the only Portuguese-language centered public library in the United States since its opening in 1971. Aside from a library, Casa has served as a cultural institution and community center for the Portuguese community in New Bedford (Note: In 2025, Portuguese Americans made up 34% and Cape Verdean Americans made up 8.8% of New Bedford's population.). The library has hosted events with Portuguese writers, artists, and politicians, such as former president of the Azores Carlos Cesar.

Following the prospect of closing in 2025, Casa committed to focusing on Portuguese material and serving as a research center for Portuguese American history in New Bedford.

== Collections ==
As of 2025, the library had 34,000 items and 92 newspaper subscriptions related to the Lusosphere in English, Portuguese, and Cape Verdean Creole. The library also provides newspapers, magazines, and videos. Around half of the collection is in Portuguese or Cape Verdean Creole. The library also holds archives of Portuguese American history in New Bedford.

As of 2023, the library has started offering material in Spanish to serve the growing Hispanic community in the region.
