= New Bedford, Massachusetts =

New Bedford
- City
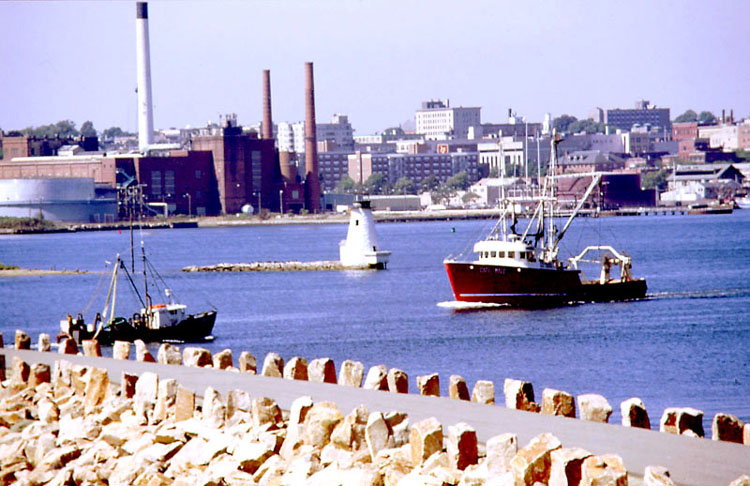
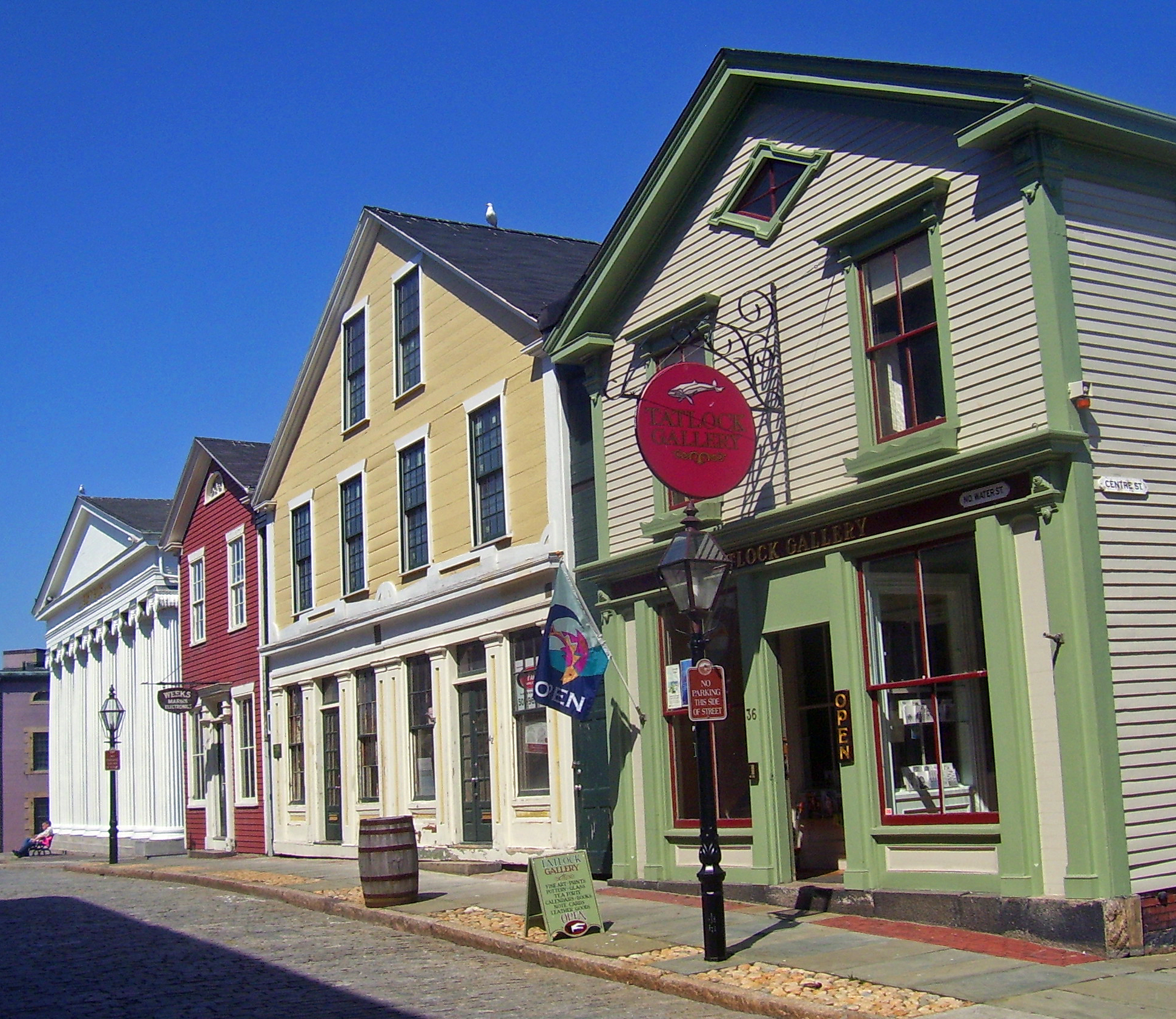
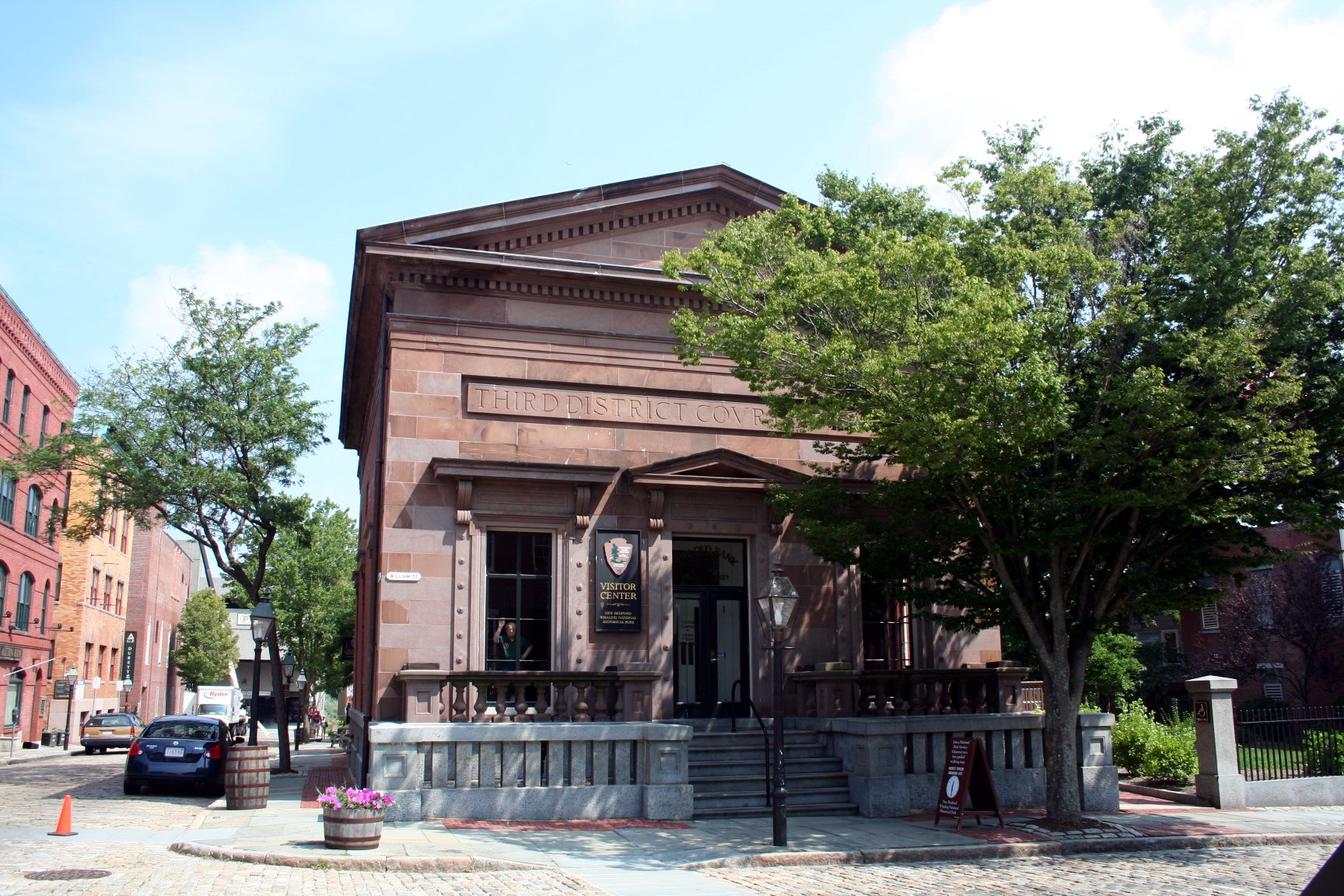
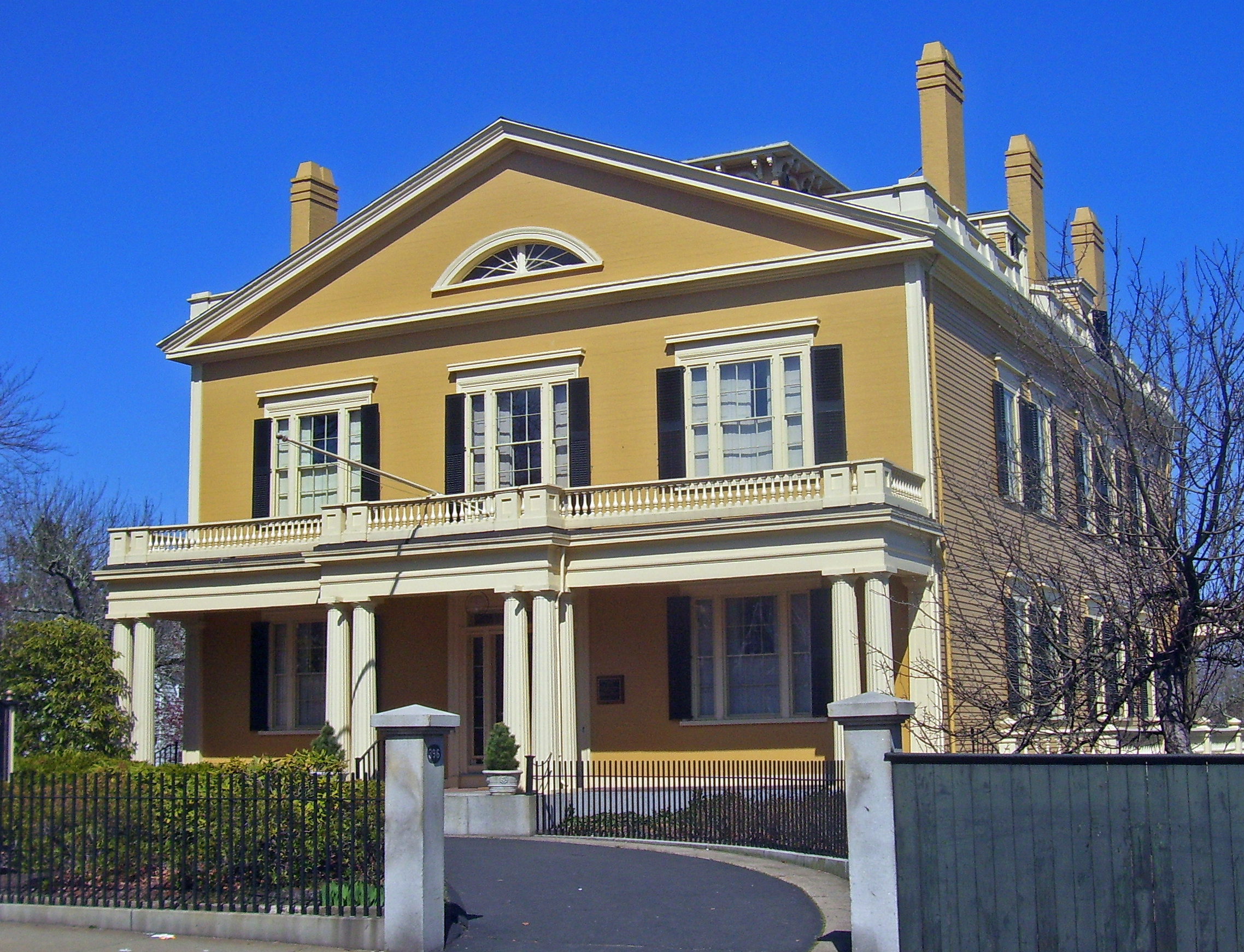
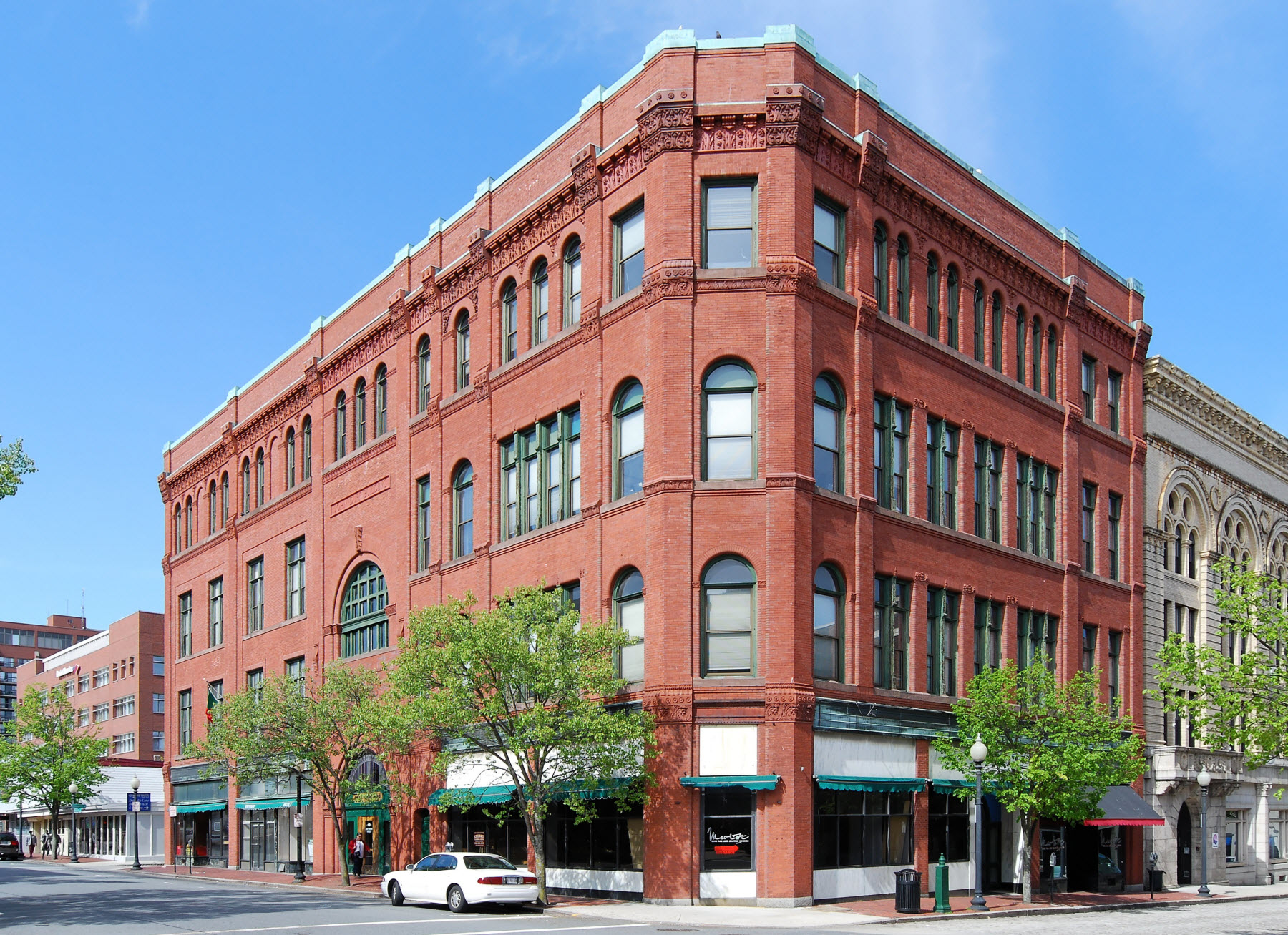
- Skyline of Center City from New Bedford Harbor New Bedford Historic District New Bedford Whaling National Historic Park William Rotch House Central New Bedford Historic District

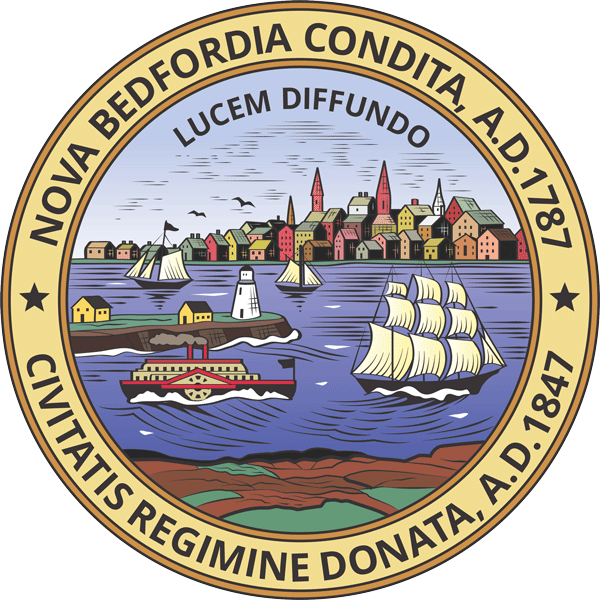
- Seal Wordmark
- Nickname: "The Whaling City"
- Motto: Lucem Diffundo (Latin) "I Diffuse Light"
- Location in Bristol County, Massachusetts

- Location in Massachusetts Location in the United States
- Coordinates: 41°38′10″N 70°56′05″W
- Country: United States
- State: Massachusetts
- County: Bristol
- Settled: 1652
- Incorporated (town): 1787
- Incorporated (city): 1847

Government
  - Type: Mayor–council
  - Mayor: Jonathan F. Mitchell (D)

Area
  - Total: 24.13 sq mi (62.50 km^{2})
  - Land: 20.00 sq mi (51.80 km^{2})
  - Water: 4.13 sq mi (10.70 km^{2})
- Elevation: 49 ft (15 m)

Population (2020)
  - Total: 101,079
  - Density: 5,053.7/sq mi (1,951.25/km^{2})
- Time zone: UTC−5 (Eastern)
  - Summer (DST): UTC−4 (Eastern)
- ZIP Code: 02740, 02744–02746
- Area code: 508/774
- FIPS code: 25-45000
- GNIS feature ID: 0613714
- Website: www.newbedford-ma.gov

New Bedford is a city in Bristol County, Massachusetts, United States. It is located on the Acushnet River abutting Buzzards Bay. At the 2020 census, New Bedford had a population of 101,079, making it the state's ninth-largest city. It is included in both the Providence metropolitan area and the greater Boston combined statistical area.

Up through the 17th century, the area was the territory of the Wampanoag Native Americans. English colonists bought the land on which New Bedford would later be built from the Wampanoag in 1652, and the original colonial settlement that would later become the city was founded by English Quakers in the late 17th century. The town of New Bedford itself was officially incorporated in 1787.

During the first half of the 19th century, New Bedford was one of the world's most important whaling ports. At its economic height during this period, New Bedford was the wealthiest city in North America per capita. The city served as a setting in Herman Melville's 1851 novel Moby-Dick. From 1876 to 1900, New Bedford served as the initial home port for the Revenue Cutter School of Instruction, the precursor of the United States Coast Guard Academy.

New Bedford Harbor remains known for its fishing fleet and accompanying seafood industry, which as of 2019 generated the highest annual value of any fishing port in the United States. The city is also known for its British-American culture, as well as its large Portuguese and French populations.

== History ==
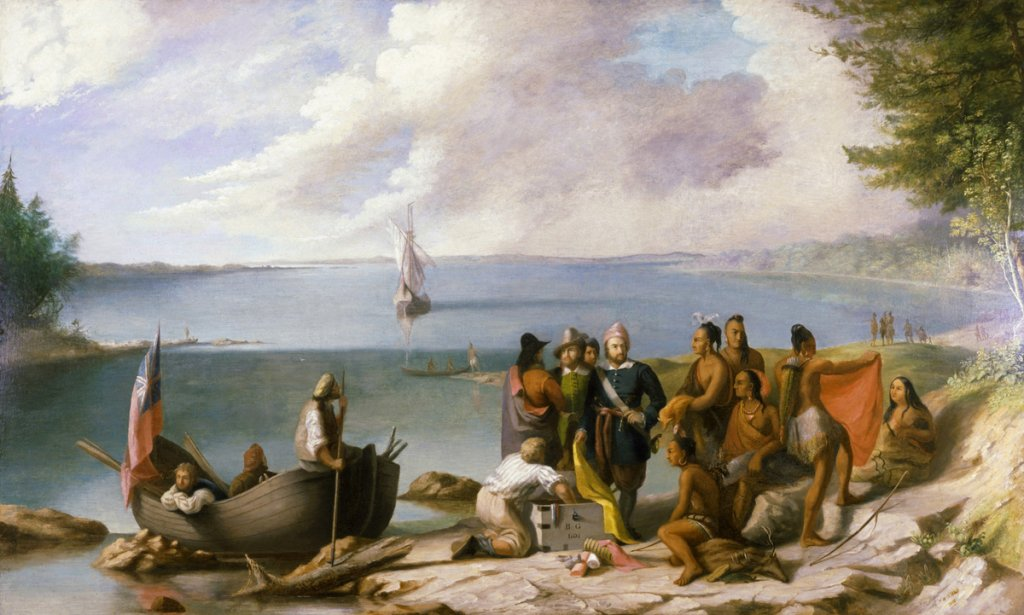
William Allen Wall's 1842 depiction of Wampanoag people meeting Bartholomew Gosnold and his crew upon their arrival in New Bedford in 1602

Before the 17th century, the lands along the Acushnet River were inhabited by the Wampanoag Native Americans, who had settlements throughout southeastern Massachusetts and Rhode Island, including Martha's Vineyard and Nantucket. Their population is believed to have been about 12,000.

Territories of the Wampanoag people around 1620, between first European explorations of the Acushnet River in 1602 and the establishment of Old Dartmouth in 1652.

On May 15, 1602, English explorer Bartholomew Gosnold in the ship Concord landed on Cuttyhunk Island while exploring New England. From there, he explored Cape Cod and the neighboring areas, including the site of present-day New Bedford. Gosnold left and settled in the Jamestown Colony of Virginia.

=== Old Dartmouth ===
Purchase deed from November 29, 1652, for Old Dartmouth.

In 1652, English colonists purchased Old Dartmouth—a region of 115,000 acres (470 km^{2}) that is now Dartmouth, Acushnet, New Bedford, Fairhaven, and Westport—in a treaty between the Wampanoag, represented by Chief Ousamequin (Massasoit) and his son Wamsutta, and John Winslow, William Bradford, Myles Standish, Thomas Southworth, and John Cooke. While the Europeans considered themselves full owners of the land through the transaction, the Wampanoag have disputed this claim because the concept of land ownership—in contrast with hunting, fishing, and farming rights—was a foreign concept to them.

==== Quakers ====
Members of the Religious Society of Friends, also known as Quakers, were among the early European settlers in southeastern Massachusetts They had faced persecution in the Puritan communities of Plymouth Colony and Massachusetts Bay Colony; the latter banned the Quakers in 1656–1657. When the Massachusetts Bay Colony annexed the Plymouth Colony in 1691, Quakers already represented a majority of the population of Old Dartmouth. In 1699, with the support of Peleg Slocum, the Quakers built their first meeting house in Old Dartmouth, where the Apponegansett Meeting House is now located.

At first, the Old Dartmouth territory had no major town centers, and instead had isolated farms and small, decentralized villages, such as Russells' Mills. One reason for this is that the inhabitants enjoyed their independence from the Plymouth Colony and they did not want the Plymouth court to appoint them a minister.

At this time, the economy primarily ran on agriculture and fishing. The availability of land attracted many Quakers and Baptists from Newport and Portsmouth in Rhode Island, as well as more waves of Puritan migration.

==== King Philip's War ====
The rising European population and increasing demand for land led the colonists' relationship with the indigenous inhabitants of New England to deteriorate. European encroachment and disregard for the terms of the Old Dartmouth Purchase led to King Philip's War in 1675. In this conflict, Wampanoag tribesmen, allied with the Narragansett and the Nipmuc, raided Old Dartmouth and other European settlements in the area. Europeans in Old Dartmouth garrisoned in sturdier homes—John Russell's home at Russells Mills, John Cooke's home in Fairhaven, and a third garrison on Palmer Island.

=== New Bedford ===
A section of Old Dartmouth near the west bank of the Acushnet River, originally called Bedford Village, was officially incorporated as the town of New Bedford on February 23, 1787, after the American Revolutionary War. The name was suggested by the Russell family, who were prominent citizens of the community. The Dukes of Bedford, a leading English aristocratic house, also bore the surname Russell. (Bedford, Massachusetts, had been incorporated in 1729; hence "New" Bedford.)

The late 18th century was a time of growth for the town. A small whale fishery developed, as well as modest international trade. In the 1760s, between the Seven Years' War and the American Revolution, shipwrights, carpenters, mechanics, and blacksmiths, settled around New Bedford harbor, creating a skilled and comprehensive maritime community.

New Bedford's first newspaper, The Medley (also known as the New Bedford Marine Journal), was founded in 1792. On June 12, 1792, the town set up its first post office. William Tobey was its first postmaster. The construction of a bridge (originally a toll bridge) between New Bedford and present-day Fairhaven in 1796 also spurred growth. (Fairhaven separated from New Bedford in 1812, forming an independent town that included both present-day Fairhaven and present-day Acushnet.)

=== Whaling City ===
Nantucket had been the dominant whaling port, though the industry was controlled by a cartel of merchants in Boston, Newport, and Providence. In the 1760s, Nantucket's most prominent whaling families moved to New Bedford, refining their own oil and making their own premium candles.

The American Revolutionary War completely paralyzed the whaling industry. The Battle of Fairhaven, the first naval battle of the war occurred on 13 and 14 May 1775, in Buzzard's Bay. While an American victory, it neither broke the Royal Navy blockade nor prevented Grey's raid in September 1778, when British troops raided New Bedford and burnt ships, warehouses, and wharves; the ensuing conflagration unintentionally spread to nearby homes and churches. 38 American troops manning a small fort on the other side of the Acushnet River briefly fired at the ships the raiders arrived on before spiking their guns and abandoning the fort. The British returned fire and destroyed the fort’s guns.

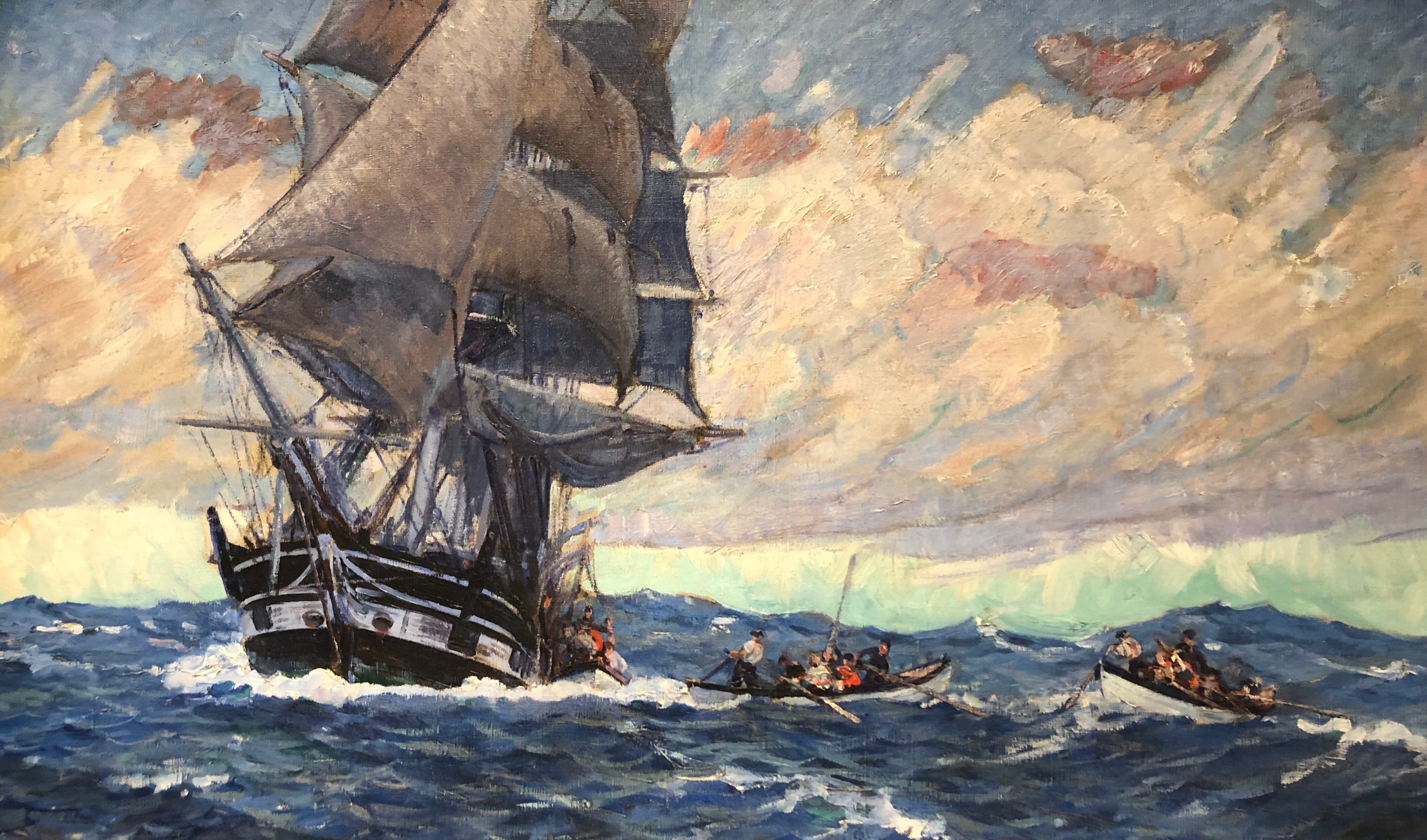
Lowering Boats by Clifford Warren Ashley, held at the New Bedford Whaling Museum

Nantucket was even more exposed, and the physical destruction, frozen economy, and import taxes imposed after the war obliterated previous fortunes. New Bedford also had a deeper harbor and was located on the mainland. As a result, New Bedford supplanted Nantucket as the nation's preeminent whaling port, and so began the Golden Age of Whaling. William Rotch (owner of the Dartmouth of the Boston Tea Party) and Samuel Rodman were important Quaker businessmen in the whaling industry.

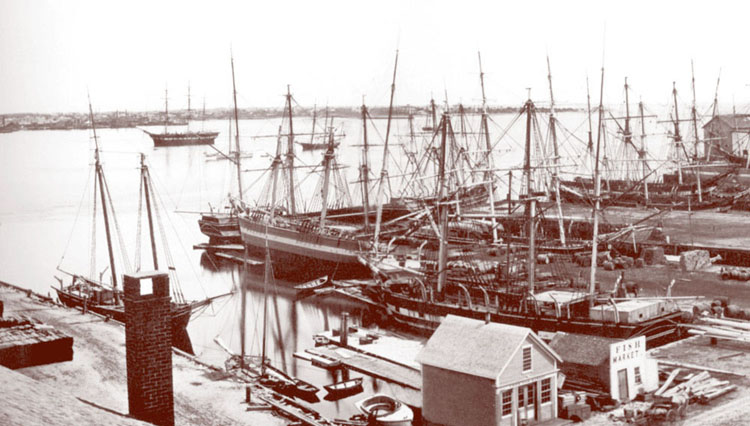
The New Bedford waterfront in 1867

After the War of 1812's embargo was lifted, New Bedford started amassing a number of colossal, sturdy, square-rigged whaling ships, many of them built at the shipyard of Mattapoisett. The invention of on-board tryworks, a system of massive iron pots over a brick furnace, allowed the whalers to render high quality oil from the blubber. This allowed the whaling ships to go out to sea for as long as four years, processing their catch while at sea. Ships from New Bedford came back to port with barrels of oil, spermaceti, and occasionally ambergris.

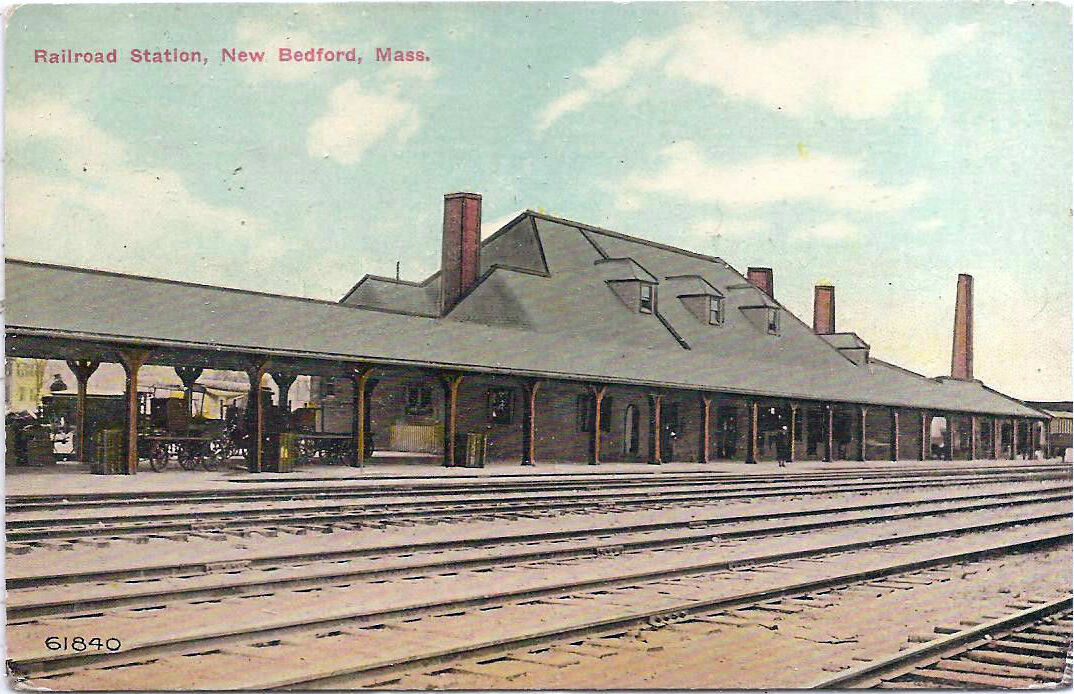
Old Colony Railroad Station in New Bedford, as it looked c. 1907–1915. As early as 1840, New Bedford was integrated into the northeastern economy by rail.

Whaling dominated New Bedford's economy for much of the century, and many families of the city were involved with it as crew and officers of ships. The Quakers remained prominent and influential in New Bedford throughout the whaling era. They brought religious values into their business models, promoting stability as well as prosperity, investing in infrastructure projects such as rail, and employing without discrimination. They established solid social and economic relationships with Boston, New York, and Philadelphia, integrating New Bedford into the urban northeastern economy.

Ten thousand men worked in the whaling industry. During this period, New Bedford's population increased from approximately 4,000 in 1820 to about 24,000 in 1860. At the height of the whaling industry in 1857, the harbor hosted 329 vessels worth over $12 million, and New Bedford became the richest city per capita in North America.

On March 18, 1847, the town of New Bedford officially became a city; Abraham Hathaway Howland was elected its first mayor.

=== Quaker Cultural Influence ===
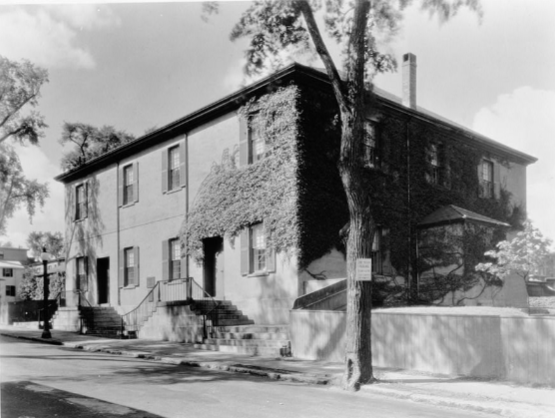
The New Bedford Meeting House, built in 1822, replaced an earlier Quaker meeting house on Spring Street

British Quaker traditions have long been an important part of New Bedford's social and commercial history. Principles of simplicity, equality, empathy, egalitarianism and community-building shaped the business practices of prominent Quaker merchants. Their influence also contributed to a working environment in which people from different backgrounds found employment in the city's maritime and commercial industries.

=== Whaling decline ===
The whaling industry went into decline after the 1859 discovery of petroleum in Pennsylvania. Each decade thenceforth saw a gradual decrease in whaling work, activity, and revenue. During the Civil War, the Confederacy engaged in commerce raiding with ships such as the Alabama, the Florida, and the Shenandoah, trying to attack the Yankee whaling industry and sabotage the US economy. Additionally, the US federal government bought several inactive whalers, filled them with stones, sand, and dirt, and towed them to Charleston, South Carolina, where the Union Navy sank what became known as the Stone Fleet in an unsuccessful attempt to blockade the Confederate bay. Along with the poor business and low whale populations, this dealt a potent blow to a failing industry.

=== Textile industry ===
New Bedford in 1876

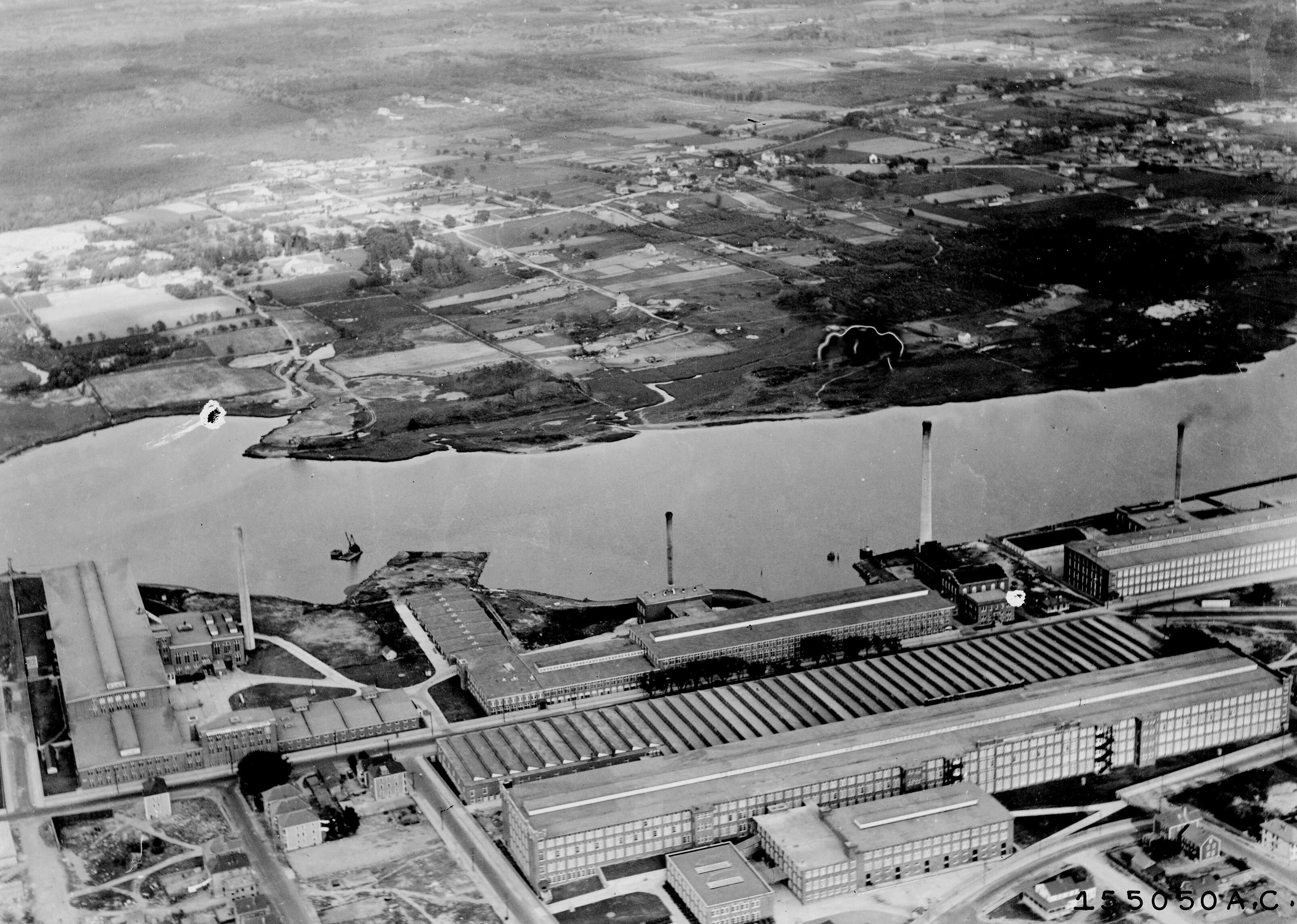
New Bedford Cotton Mill in 1923

In the midst of this decline, greater New Bedford's economy became more dependent on the textile industry, which began to eclipse the whaling industry in the late 19th century. The mills grew and expanded constantly, eventually comprising multiple sites along the Acushnet River. In 1875 alone, the Wamsutta Mills processed 19,000 bales of cotton into 20 million yards of cloth, which had a wholesale value comparable to that of the entire whaling catch, and continued to produce over 20 million yards of cloth yearly after 1883. The Wamsutta Mills remained the world's largest weaving plant until 1892.

The textile mills redefined wealth in New Bedford, and gave birth to a prosperity greater than that of the whaling industry. New Bedford, funded by industrial fortunes, developed a thriving art scene. The Mount Washington Glass Company (which later became Pairpoint) crafted works of glass and silver for the newly affluent class, and examples of these works can be seen today on the second floor of the New Bedford Whaling Museum.

In the 1920s, local employers came under competitive pressure from new textile factories in the low-wage South. In April 1928 their demand for a 10 percent across the board cut in wages was met with strike action. After considerable controversy control of the large-scale work stoppage passed from the Communist-led Textile Mill Committee (TMC) to sundry craft unions affiliated with the American Federation of Labor who, agreeing to a five percent wage cut, ended the strike in October. Wage reductions were not enough to arrest the long-term competitive decline of the local textile industry.

New Bedford 1911–12 by Lewis Hine for the NCLC.

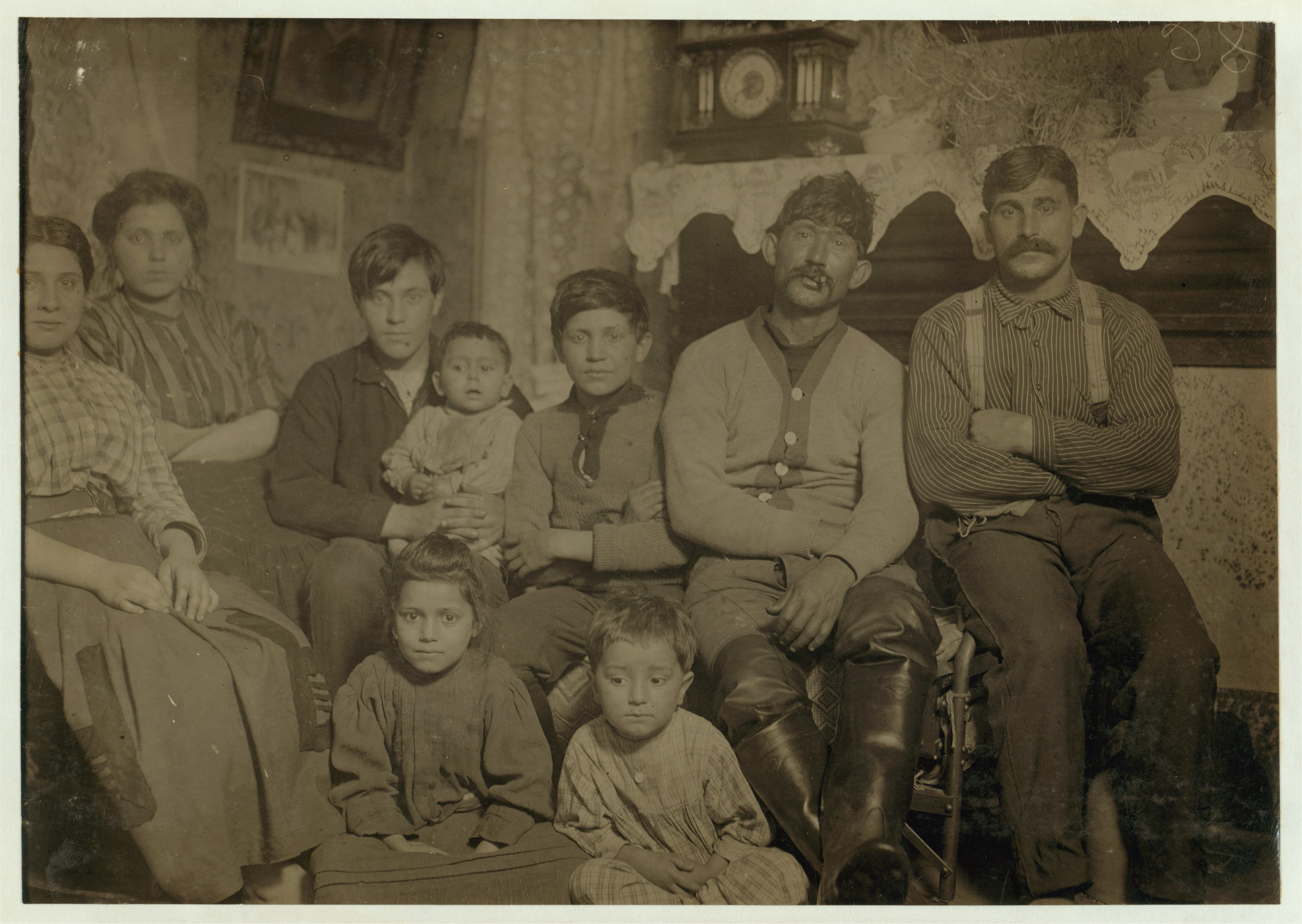

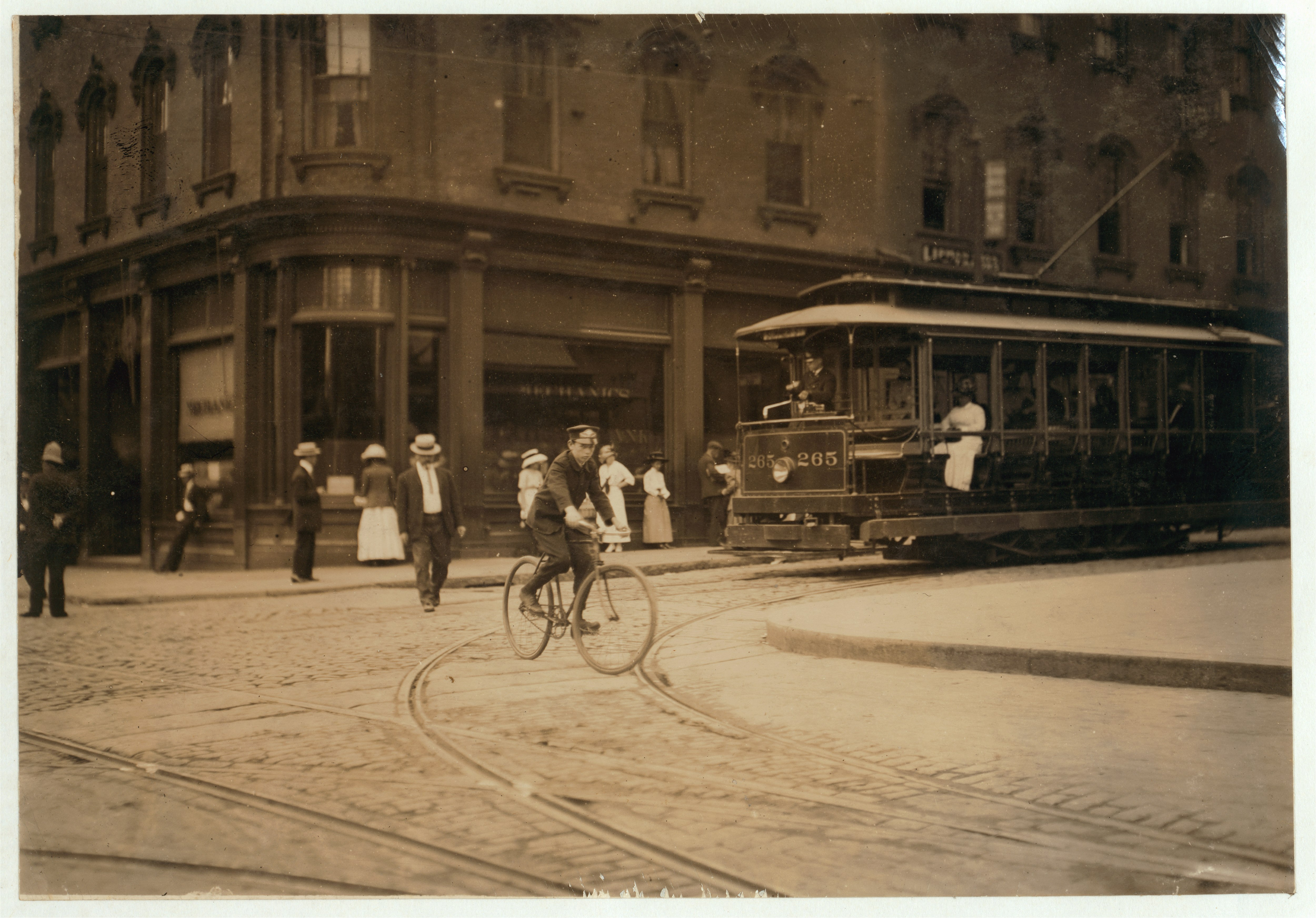

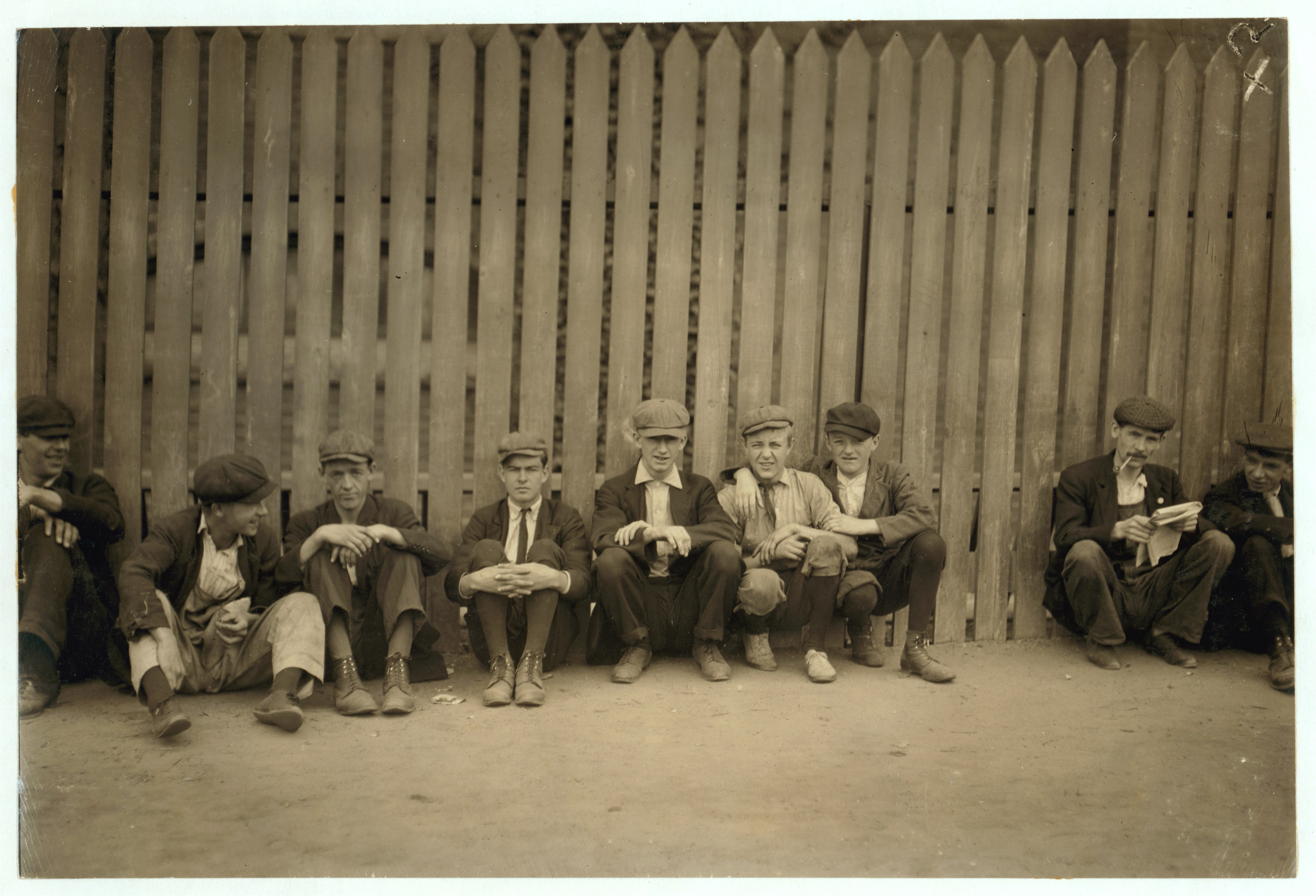

=== Immigration ===
Until 1800, New Bedford and its surrounding communities were, by and large, populated by Protestants of English, Scottish, Welsh, and Dutch origin. During the first half of the 19th century many Irish people came to Massachusetts. In 1818, Irish immigrants established the Catholic mission that built St. Mary's Church. During the Great Irish Famine of the 1840s, which was to drive many more across the Atlantic, with the town's whaling "aristocracy" (many of them Quaker) they were active in providing their compatriots with relief. New Bedford's once significant Irish population declined in the 20th century; as with many immigrant groups, as they had become established they moved out to the suburbs.

Later in the 19th century, immigrants from Portugal began arriving in New Bedford and the surrounding area, attracted by jobs in the whaling industry; many had family members who had worked on whaling ships. As the Portuguese community began to increase in population, it established the first Portuguese parish in the city, St. John the Baptist (1871).

The city's annual Feast of the Blessed Sacrament, initiated in 1915 by four immigrants from Madeira, is the world's largest celebration of Luso-American heritage, regularly drawing crowds of tens of thousands to the city's Madeira Field.

French Canadians also secured a foothold in New Bedford at about the same time, building the Church of the Sacred Heart in 1877, as did Polish immigrants who in 1903 established the parish of Our Lady of Perpetual Help (the church closed in 2022).

A number of Jewish families, arriving in the mid 19th century from, were active in candle-making and in selling provisions and outfitting ships for the whaling fleet. During the years leading up to the First World War, a sizable eastern-European Jewish community joined them in New Bedford. Some became prominent merchants and businessmen, mainly in textiles and manufacturing.

=== Modern history ===
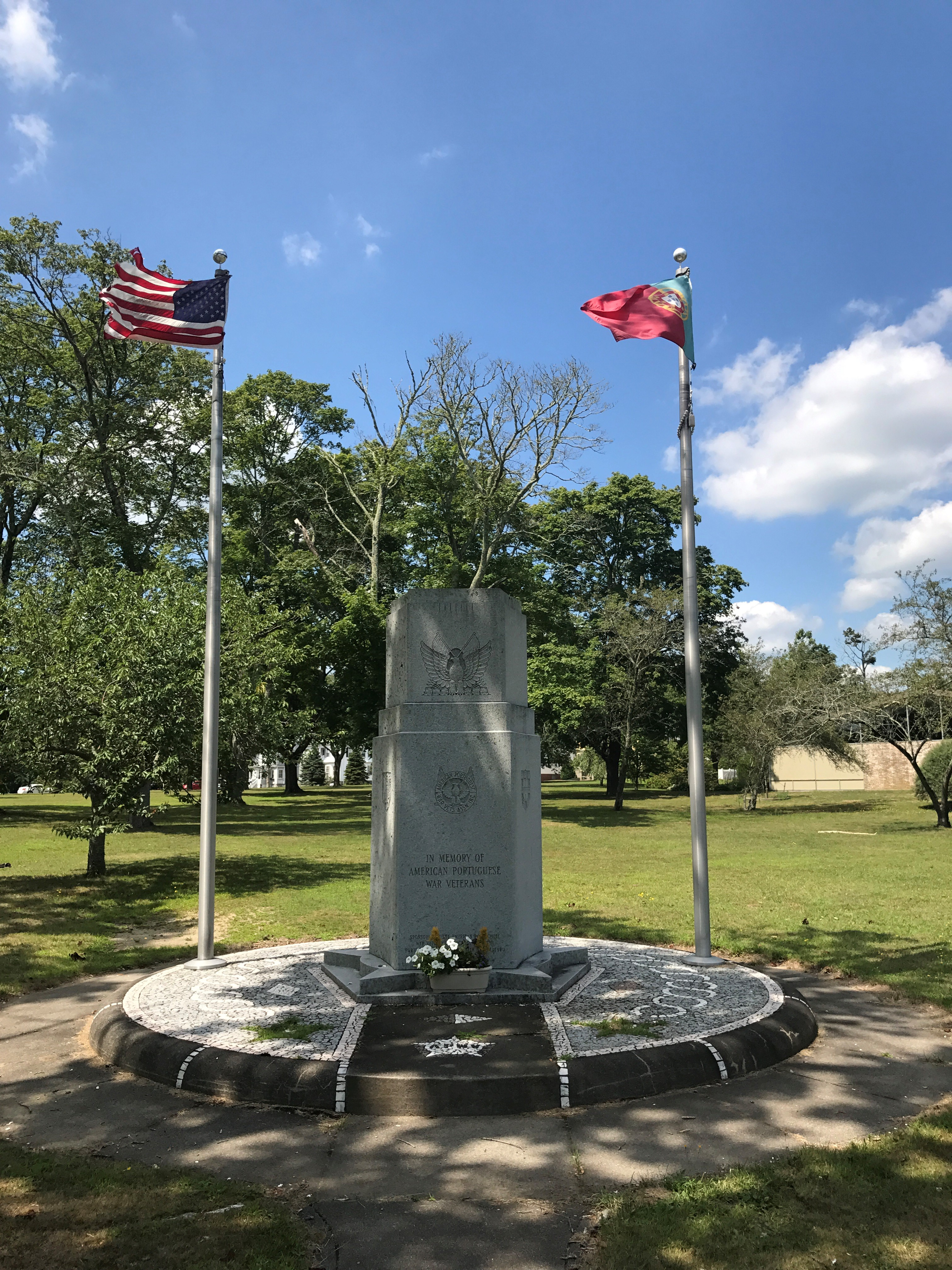
Monument to Portuguese-American Veterans

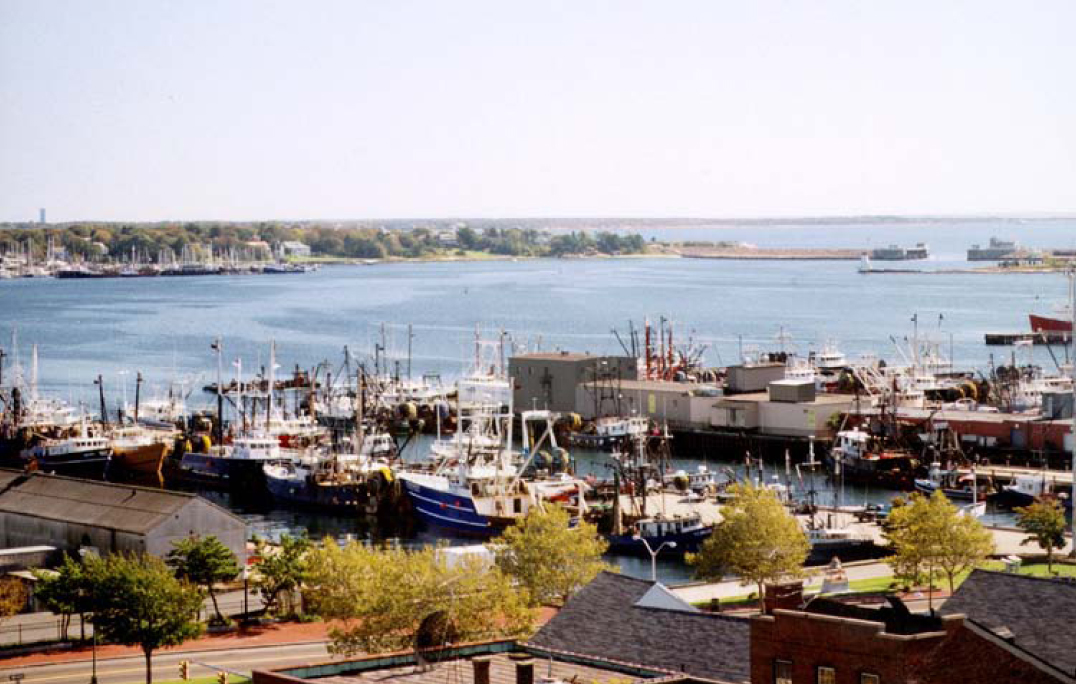
View of boats docked at New Bedford

Fishing and manufacturing continue to be two of the largest businesses in the area, and healthcare has become a major employer. The three largest single employers based in New Bedford are Southcoast Hospitals Group, one of the top ten employers in Massachusetts (healthcare), Titleist (golf clubs, balls, apparel, manufacturing), and Riverside Manufacturing (apparel manufacturing).

According to a 2001 study by the University of Massachusetts Dartmouth Center for Policy Analysis, the three largest employment sectors in the Greater New Bedford area (the area includes New Bedford and Acushnet, Dartmouth, Fairhaven, Freetown, Lakeville, Marion, Mattapoisett, Rochester, and Wareham) were as follows: services (26% of total employment); wholesale trade (22%); manufacturing (19%). The largest industries by employment in the area were as follows: health services, eating and drinking places, wholesale trade, food stores, and social services.

In 2002, the city received $61,194,358 in taxation revenue, $44,536,201 in local receipts, and $12,044,152 classified as other available.

In 2005 the unemployment rate was 7.3%, having dropped throughout the 1990s from 12.5% to 5.3% in 2000, and then having risen to 10.4% in 2003. By 2009, in the midst of the economic crisis of the era, the unemployment rate got as high as 12.4%.

In 2005, the city received $104,925,772 for education, and $22,755,439 for general government from the State of Massachusetts.

In 2016, the city hopes its proximity to Massachusetts' southern coastline will allow it to become a center for the growing wind energy market. Three companies, OffshoreMW, Deepwater Wind, and DONG Energy, have leased portions of New Bedford's Marine Commerce Terminal for the staging of turbines and platforms.

=== Establishments ===
In 1847, the New Bedford Horticultural Society was founded by James Arnold.

The Ash Street Jail, which houses inmates from Bristol County, is located in New Bedford. It opened in 1829 and is the oldest continuously operating jail in the United States.

Fort Taber and Fort Rodman (also called the "Fort at Clark's Point") were built during the American Civil War and are now in Fort Taber Park. Both forts are often called Fort Taber, including in some references.

== Geography ==
New Bedford is located at 41°39′06″N 70°56′01″W (41.651803, −70.933705). According to the United States Census Bureau, the city has a total area of 24.1 square miles (62.5 km^{2}). Of the total area, 20.0 square miles (51.8 km^{2}) is land, and 4.1 square miles (10.7 km^{2}), or 17.13%, is water. New Bedford is a coastal city, a seaport, bordered on the west by Dartmouth, on the north by Freetown, on the east by Acushnet and Fairhaven, and on the south by Buzzards Bay. From New Bedford's northern border with Freetown to the Buzzards Bay coast at Clark's Point the distance is approximately 14 miles (23 km). Across New Bedford east to west is a distance of about 2 miles (3.2 km). The highest point in the city is an unnamed hill crossed by Interstate 195 and Hathaway Road west of downtown, with an elevation greater than 180 feet (55 m) above sea level.

The Port of New Bedford, also known as New Bedford Harbor, a body of water shared with the town of Fairhaven is the estuary of the Acushnet River where it empties into Buzzards Bay. The river empties into the bay beyond Clark's Point, the southernmost point of the city. To the west of Clark's Point is Clark's Cove, which extends landward approximately one and one-half miles from the bay. Just south of Palmer's Island, beginning near Fort Phoenix in Fairhaven, lies a two-mile-long hurricane barrier, constructed in the 1960s to protect the inner harbor where the fishing fleet anchors. Along with Palmer's Island, the city also lays claim to Fish Island and Pope's Island. Between these two islands lies one of the three sections, the central section, of the Roland J. Herbert Bridge (colloquially known as the New Bedford-Fairhaven Bridge). The central span, a swing bridge, connects the two islands as well as allowing boats and ships passage to the upper harbor. Two conventional bridges connect each of the islands to the nearest mainland, Fish Island to New Bedford and Pope's Island to Fairhaven. In addition to the harbor, there are several small brooks and ponds within the city limits.

=== Parks ===
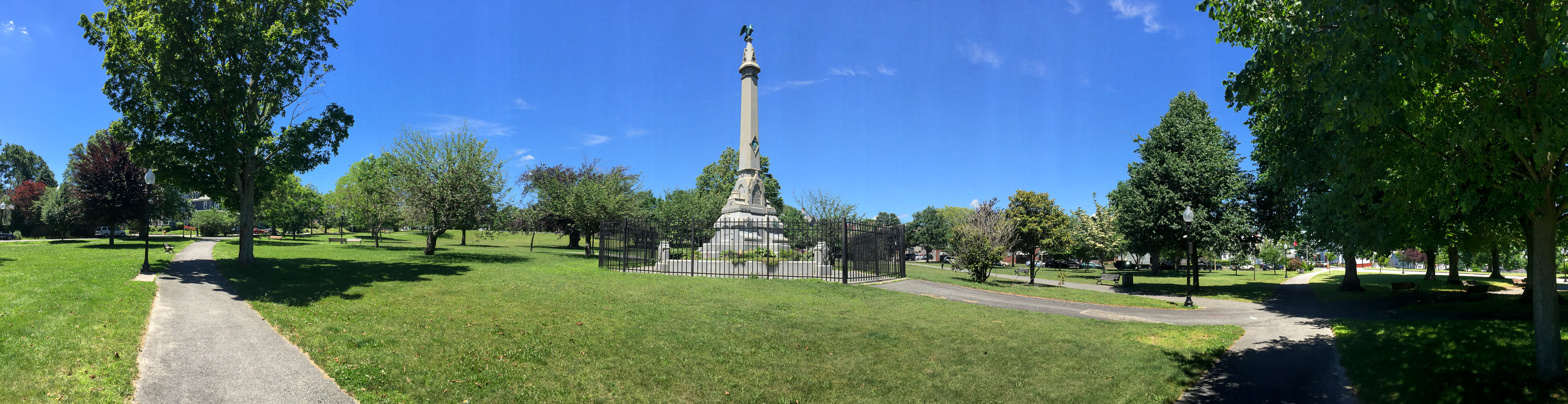
Soldiers and Sailors Monument stands in the center of Clasky Common Park

There are several parks and playgrounds, some with splash pads, scattered throughout the city, with the first four being primary parks:

- Acushnet Cedar Swamp State Reservation
- Allen C. Haskell Public Gardens
- Ashley Park
- Baby Kenney Tot Lot
- Brooklawn Park
- Buttonwood Park
- Captain Jack Peterson Dog Park
- Clasky Common Park
- Custom House Square
- Flora B. Pierce Nature Trail
- Fort Rodman/Taber Park
- Hazelwood Park
- Marine Park at Pope's Island
- New Bedford Covewalk
- New Bedford Whaling National Historical Park
- Ricketson's Nature Trail
- River's End Park
- Riverside Park
- Roberto Clemente Park
- Ross C. Mathieu Nature Trail
- Victory Park Community Gardens

=== Climate ===
New Bedford has a cooler than normal version of a humid subtropical climate that in many aspects resembles a humid continental one, but with slightly milder winters. In spite of being influenced by continental winds with large differences between seasons, temperatures are somewhat moderated compared to areas farther inland. There is high precipitation year-round, with winter being split between rainfall and snowfall.

Climate data for New Bedford, Massachusetts (1991–2020 normals, extremes 1893–2002)
Month	Jan	Feb	Mar	Apr	May	Jun	Jul	Aug	Sep	Oct	Nov	Dec	Year
Record high °F (°C)	67 (19)	69 (21)	80 (27)	96 (36)	98 (37)	102 (39)	103 (39)	107 (42)	94 (34)	90 (32)	79 (26)	74 (23)	107 (42)
Mean daily maximum °F (°C)	38.1 (3.4)	39.6 (4.2)	46.8 (8.2)	56.1 (13.4)	67.5 (19.7)	78.1 (25.6)	84.0 (28.9)	82.2 (27.9)	75.3 (24.1)	64.2 (17.9)	52.7 (11.5)	43.2 (6.2)	60.7 (15.9)
Daily mean °F (°C)	30.1 (−1.1)	31.2 (−0.4)	38.0 (3.3)	47.9 (8.8)	58.6 (14.8)	68.9 (20.5)	75.6 (24.2)	74.0 (23.3)	67.1 (19.5)	56.4 (13.6)	45.1 (7.3)	35.7 (2.1)	52.4 (11.3)
Mean daily minimum °F (°C)	22.1 (−5.5)	22.8 (−5.1)	29.1 (−1.6)	39.6 (4.2)	49.6 (9.8)	59.8 (15.4)	67.2 (19.6)	65.8 (18.8)	59.0 (15.0)	48.5 (9.2)	37.4 (3.0)	28.3 (−2.1)	44.1 (6.7)
Record low °F (°C)	−10 (−23)	−12 (−24)	4 (−16)	16 (−9)	31 (−1)	39 (4)	47 (8)	44 (7)	30 (−1)	20 (−7)	8 (−13)	−11 (−24)	−12 (−24)
Average precipitation inches (mm)	3.82 (97)	4.07 (103)	5.34 (136)	4.57 (116)	3.73 (95)	4.15 (105)	3.58 (91)	4.07 (103)	4.22 (107)	4.88 (124)	4.59 (117)	5.19 (132)	52.21 (1,326)
Average snowfall inches (cm)	10.9 (28)	8.5 (22)	6.6 (17)	1.7 (4.3)	0.0 (0.0)	0.0 (0.0)	0.0 (0.0)	0.0 (0.0)	0.0 (0.0)	0.0 (0.0)	0.4 (1.0)	4.4 (11)	32.5 (83)
Average precipitation days (≥ 0.01 in)	11.3	10.6	11.8	12.2	11.3	9.6	7.9	9.0	9.7	8.3	10.3	11.6	123.6
Average snowy days (≥ 0.1 in)	4.3	3.7	2.7	0.6	0.0	0.0	0.0	0.0	0.0	0.0	0.3	2.2	13.8
Source: NOAA

== Demographics ==
Historical population
Census	Pop.	Note	%±
1790	3,313		—
1800	4,361		31.6%
1810	5,651		29.6%
1820	3,947		−30.2%
1830	7,592		92.3%
1840	12,087		59.2%
1850	16,443		36.0%
1860	22,300		35.6%
1870	21,320		−4.4%
1880	26,845		25.9%
1890	40,783		51.9%
1900	62,442		53.1%
1910	96,652		54.8%
1920	121,217		25.4%
1930	112,597		−7.1%
1940	110,341		−2.0%
1950	109,189		−1.0%
1960	102,477		−6.1%
1970	101,777		−0.7%
1980	98,478		−3.2%
1990	99,922		1.5%
2000	93,768		−6.2%
2010	95,072		1.4%
2020	101,079		6.3%
2024 (est.)	101,318		0.2%
U.S. Decennial Census

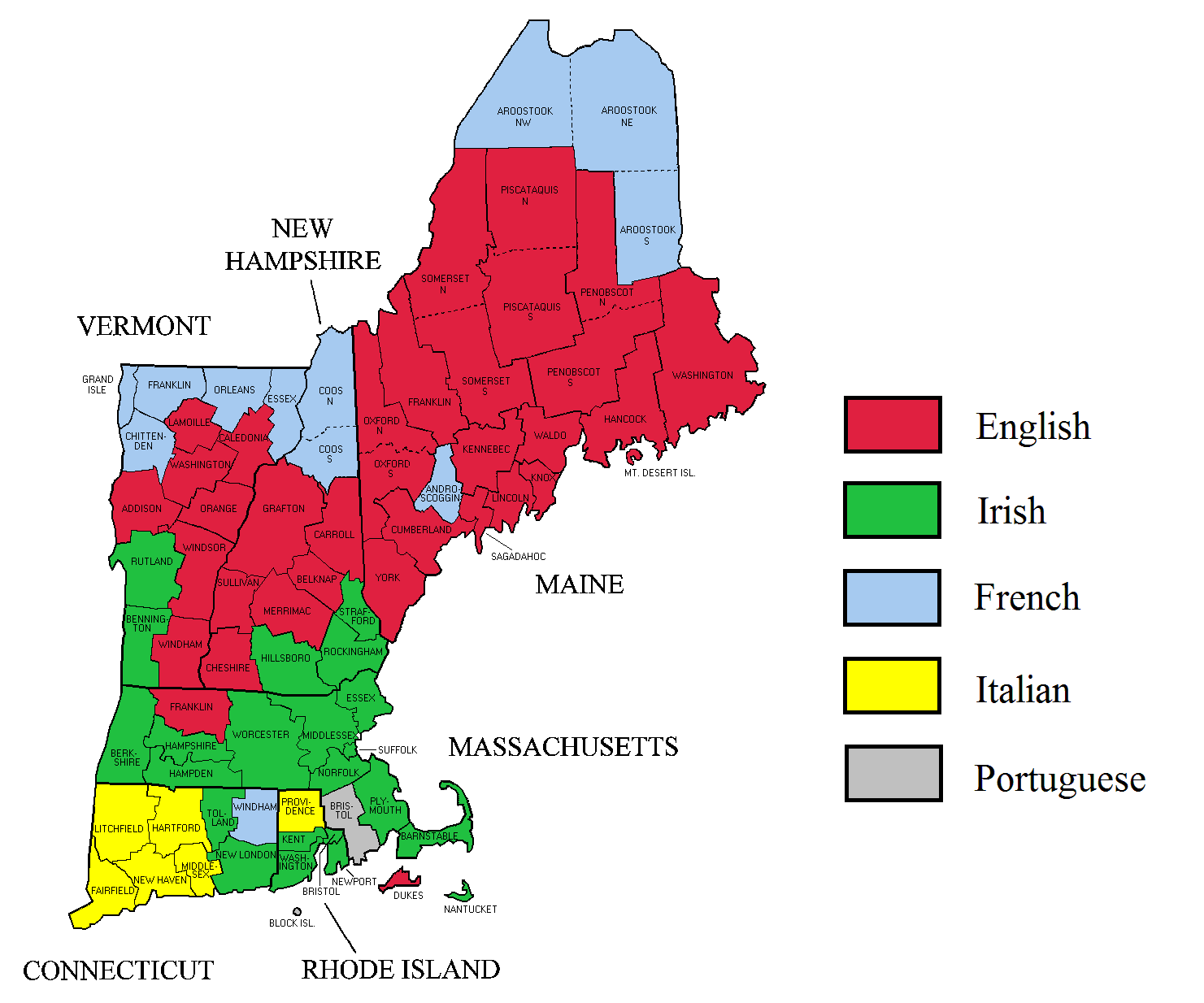
Largest self-reported ancestry groups in New England (2000 U.S. census). Americans of Portuguese descent plurality shown in grey.

=== 2020 census ===
New Bedford, Massachusetts – Racial and ethnic composition Note: the US Census treats Hispanic/Latino as an ethnic category. This table excludes Latinos from the racial categories and assigns them to a separate category. Hispanics/Latinos may be of any race.
Race / ethnicity (NH = Non-Hispanic)	Pop 2000	Pop 2010	Pop 2020	% 2000	% 2010	% 2020
White alone (NH)	70,520	64,598	57,498	75.21%	67.95%	56.88%
Black or African American alone (NH)	3,503	4,919	4,787	3.74%	5.17%	4.74%
Native American or Alaska Native alone (NH)	394	409	265	0.42%	0.43%	0.26%
Asian alone (NH)	600	879	1,010	0.64%	0.92%	1.00%
Pacific Islander alone (NH)	34	15	32	0.04%	0.02%	0.03%
Some Other Race alone (NH)	4,503	4,224	3,688	4.80%	4.44%	3.65%
Mixed Race or Multi-Racial (NH)	4,638	4,112	9,274	4.95%	4.33%	9.18%
Hispanic or Latino (any race)	9,576	15,916	24,525	10.21%	16.74%	24.26%
Total	93,768	95,072	101,079	100.00%	100.00%	100.00%

New Bedford and surrounding communities are a part of the Providence metropolitan area. The Greater Providence-Fall River-New Bedford area is home to the largest Portuguese-American community in the United States.

At the 2020 census, there were 101,079 people. The population density was 4,760 inhabitants per square mile (1,840/km^{2}). There were 42,781 housing units at an average density of 2,063 per square mile (797/km^{2}). The racial makeup of the city was 72.17% (66.1% Non-Hispanic) White, 9.69% African American, 0.1% Native American, 1.00% Asian, 0.05% Pacific Islander, 13.51% from other races, and 3.92% from two or more races. Hispanic or Latino people of any race were 16.11% of the population. The city is very multi-cultural and diverse. The ethnic makeup of the city is estimated to be 33.8% Portuguese, 10.1% Puerto Rican, 9.1% French, 8.8% West African, 6.9% Irish, 5.3% English.

There were 39,208 households, of which 31.2% had children under the age of 18 living with them, 37.5% were married couples living together, 20.9% had a female householder with no husband present, and 36.9% were non-families. 31.6% of all households were made up of individuals, and 13.6% had someone living alone who was 65 years of age or older. The average household size was 2.40 and the average family size was 3.01.

Age distribution was 24.9% under the age of 18, 9.5% from 18 to 24, 28.8% from 25 to 44, 20.2% from 45 to 64, and 16.7% who were 65 years of age or older. The median age was 36 years. For every 100 females, there were 89.1 males. For every 100 females age 18 and over, there were 84.4 males.

The median household income was $37,569, and the median family income was $45,708. Males had a median income of $37,388 versus $27,278 for females. The per capita income for the city was $15,602. About 17.3% of families and 20.2% of the population were below the poverty line, including 29.1% of those under age 18 and 15.7% of those age 65 or over.

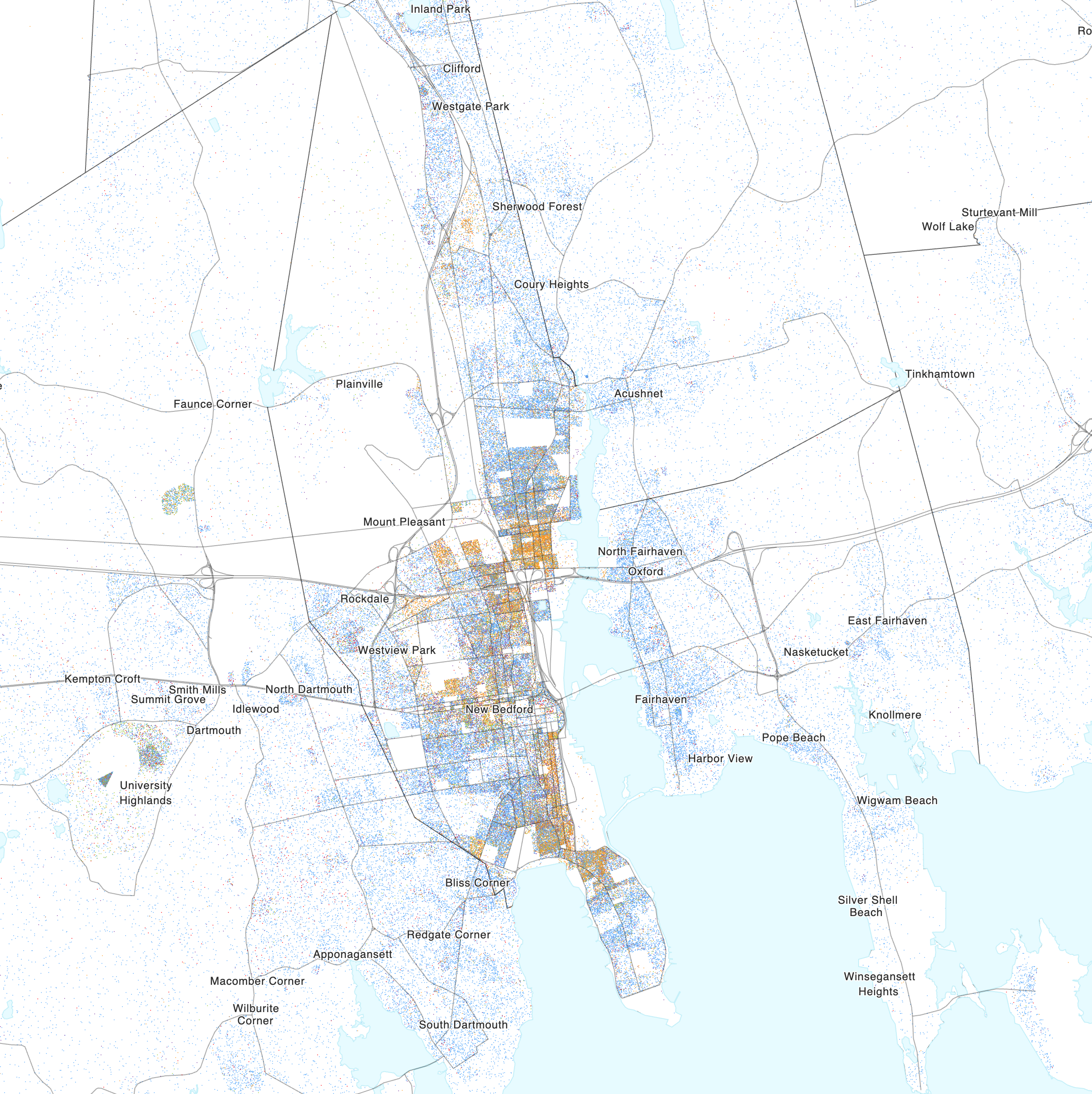
Map of racial distribution in New Bedford, 2020 U.S. census. Each dot is one person: ⬤ White ⬤ Black ⬤ Asian ⬤ Hispanic ⬤ Multiracial ⬤ Native American/Other

=== Kʼicheʼ community ===
The city has a community of Kʼicheʼ people from Guatemala who emigrated to the United States to avoid the Guatemalan Civil War. Starting in the end part of the 1980s, Kʼicheʼ adult men in Providence, Rhode Island moved to New Bedford, and other demographics of Kʼicheʼ came afterwards. Many, by 2010, were in low socioeconomic conditions and did not have documentation to be legally in the United States. In 2019 an advocacy group for the Maya people complained to the courts that the New Bedford School District was not providing adequate Kʼicheʼ language services. The U.S. Department of Justice and the school district came to resolution so the school district could provide appropriate Kʼicheʼ language services.

=== Crime ===
New Bedford is often described as a city with a high crime rate relative to Eastern Massachusetts. However, New Bedford in recent years as a city with its crime rate has been generally decreasing. The city's crime rate, including violent and property crime decreased by 38% from 2011 to 2020 with 4456 incidents in 2011 and 2171 incidents in 2020. Although New Bedford's crime rate has currently been on decrease, it cannot be yet considered a safe city compared to the U.S. national average crime rate. The FBI reported a violent crime rate in New Bedford, Massachusetts, of 640 per 100,000 residents in 2019, compared to a national average of 366.7 per 100,000 residents. An FBI report in 2020 showed burglary and breaking and entering dropped about 52% from 969 crimes in 2011 to 465 crimes in 2019.

== Economy ==
=== Early history ===
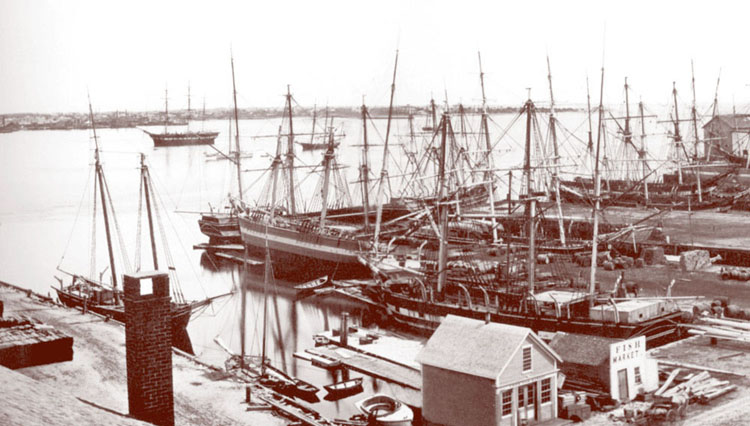
View of historic New Bedford harbor

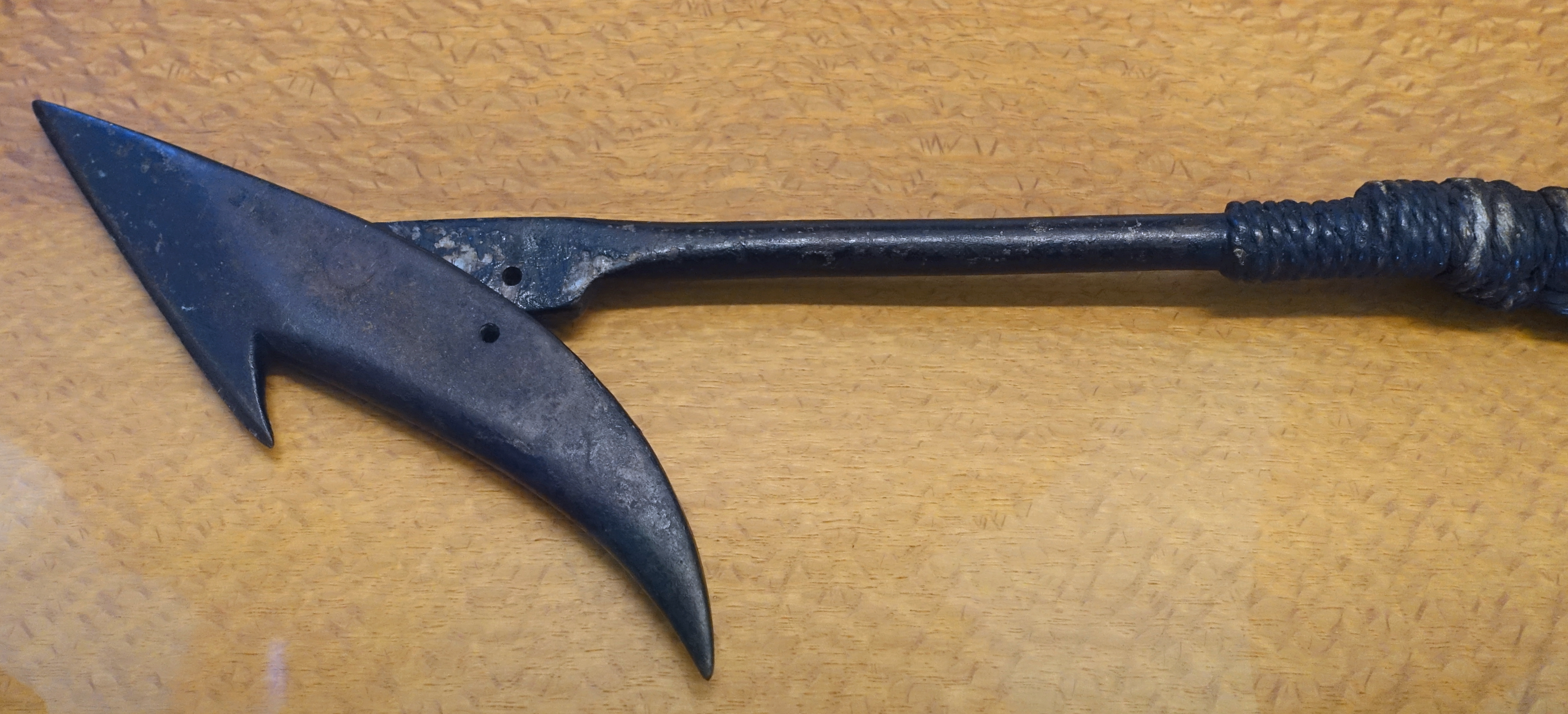
The Temple toggling harpoon

The economy of the Pilgrim settlement in the New Bedford area was initially based around a few farming and fishing villages. The early Bedford Village quickly became a commercial zone and from there became a major whaling and foreign trade port. In the early 18th century, the Russell family purchased this area and developed it into a larger village (Joseph Russell III having made the most significant contributions). Age of Sail ships built in New Bedford include the schooner Caroline and whaleship Charles W. Morgan. By the 18th century, entrepreneurs in the area, such as whaling merchants from Nantucket, were attracted to the village and helped make it into one of the top whaling cities in the country. The most significant of these merchants was Joseph Rotch, who bought ten acres (four hectares) of land in 1765 from Joseph Russell III on which he and his sons ran the family business. Rotch moved his business to New Bedford since it would be better for refining whale oil and manufacturing candles made from whales. As these parts of the whaling industry had been monopolized by a merchant cartel in Boston, Newport, Rhode Island, and Providence, Rhode Island, Rotch felt that it would be better for business to handle these himself by moving to the mainland.

The relationship between New Bedford and Nantucket allowed the two cities to dominate the whaling industry. In 1848 New Bedford resident Lewis Temple invented the toggling harpoon, an invention that revolutionized the whaling industry and helped make New Bedford its preeminent American city. Another factor was the increased draft of whaling ships, in part the result of greater use of steel in their construction, which made them too deep for Nantucket harbor. Syren, the longest lived of the clipper ships, spent over a decade transporting whale oil and whaling products to New Bedford, principally from Honolulu, and was owned for several years by William H. Besse of New Bedford. As a result of its control over whaling products that were used widely throughout the world (most importantly whale oil), New Bedford became one of the richest per capita cities in the world.

Many whalers quit their jobs in 1849, though, as the Gold Rush attracted many of them to leave New Bedford for California. During this time Herman Melville, who worked in New Bedford as a whaler, wrote the novel Moby-Dick and published it in 1851. The city is the initial setting of the book, including a scene set in the Seaman's Bethel, which still stands. Despite the power it gave to New Bedford, the whaling industry began to decline starting in 1859 when petroleum, which replaced whale oil, was discovered. Another blow came with the whaling disaster of 1871, in which 22 New Bedford whalers were lost in the ice off the coast of Alaska. The New Bedford firm J. & W. R. Wing Company, the largest whaling company in the United States, sent out its last whaleship in 1914, and whaling in New Bedford came to its final end in 1925, with the last whaling expedition being made by the schooner John R. Manta.

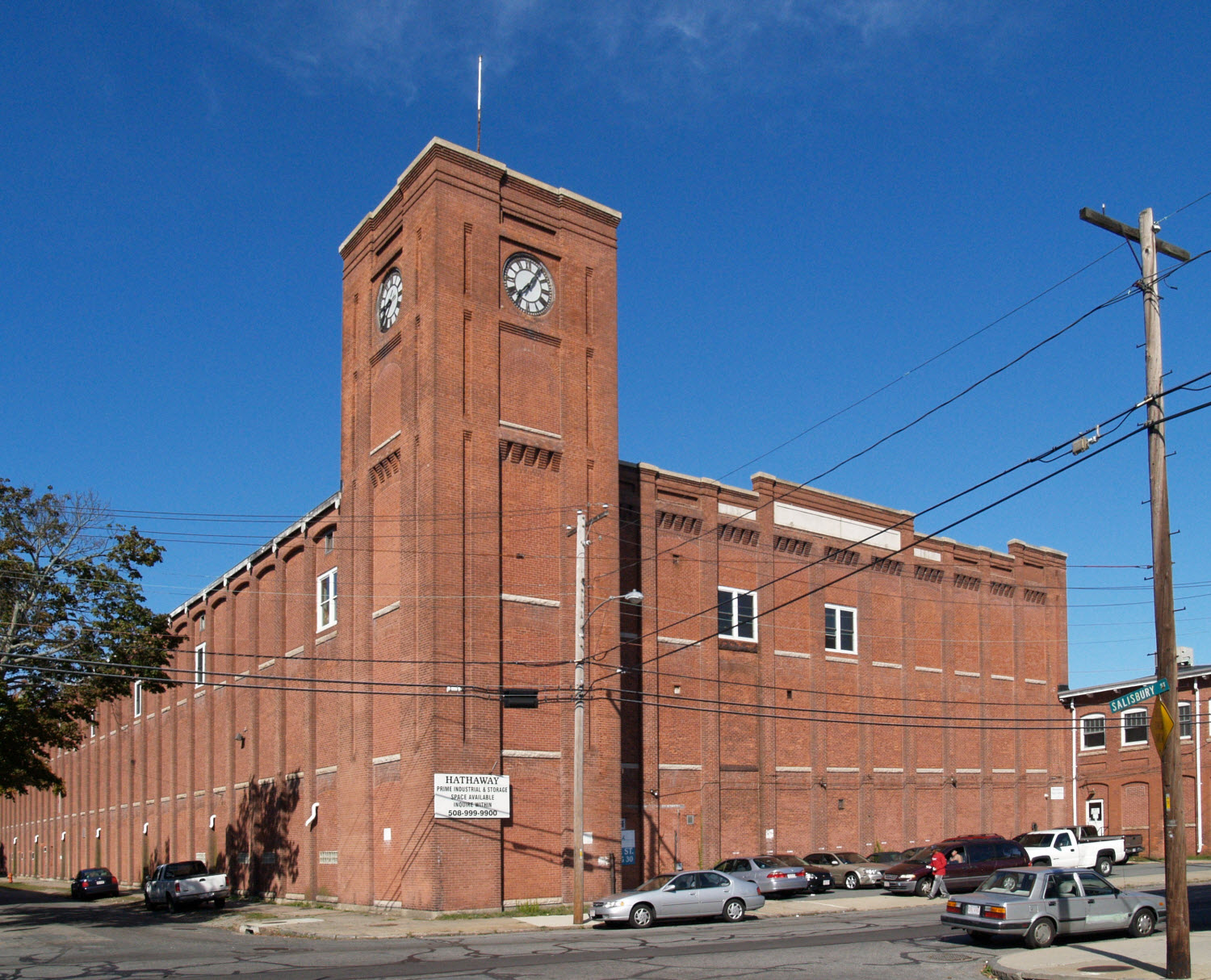
Hathaway Mills

In the mid-1840s, New Bedford was the site of a whale oil refinery producing lubricants. Later, Standard Oil bought this refinery, located on Fish Island, and newly discovered Pennsylvania crude oil was shipped to New Bedford to be refined for lamp oil and other oil. Fish Island was also the site of an early experiment in coal gasification, leading to the explosion of a building.

New Bedford was able to remain wealthy because of its textile industry. Starting in 1881, the textile industry grew large enough to sustain the city's economy. At its height, over 30,000 people were employed by the 32 cotton-manufacturing companies that owned the textile factories of New Bedford (which were worth $100 million in total). The creation of the New Bedford Textile School in 1895–1899 ushered in an era of textile prosperity that began to decline in the great depression and ended with the end of the textile period in the 1940s. The industry garnered national headlines in 1928 when it was hit with a strike of 30,000 workers. The walkout of mostly immigrant workers was given critical support by the Workers (Communist) Party and was the precursor of a more tumultuous textile strike in North Carolina held the following year.

Tool and die operations also left the area steadily, starting in the 1970s.

=== Tourism ===
While accurate figures are hard to come by, tourism appears to be a growing industry. New Bedford tourism centers on fairs and festivals including the Whaling City Festival, Fourth of July, Jazzfest, Working Waterfront Festival, Polish Fest, New Bedford Day of Portugal, Senhor Da Pedra feast, Holy Ghost of Pico feast, and the Portuguese Feast of the Blessed Sacrament.

=== Fishing ===
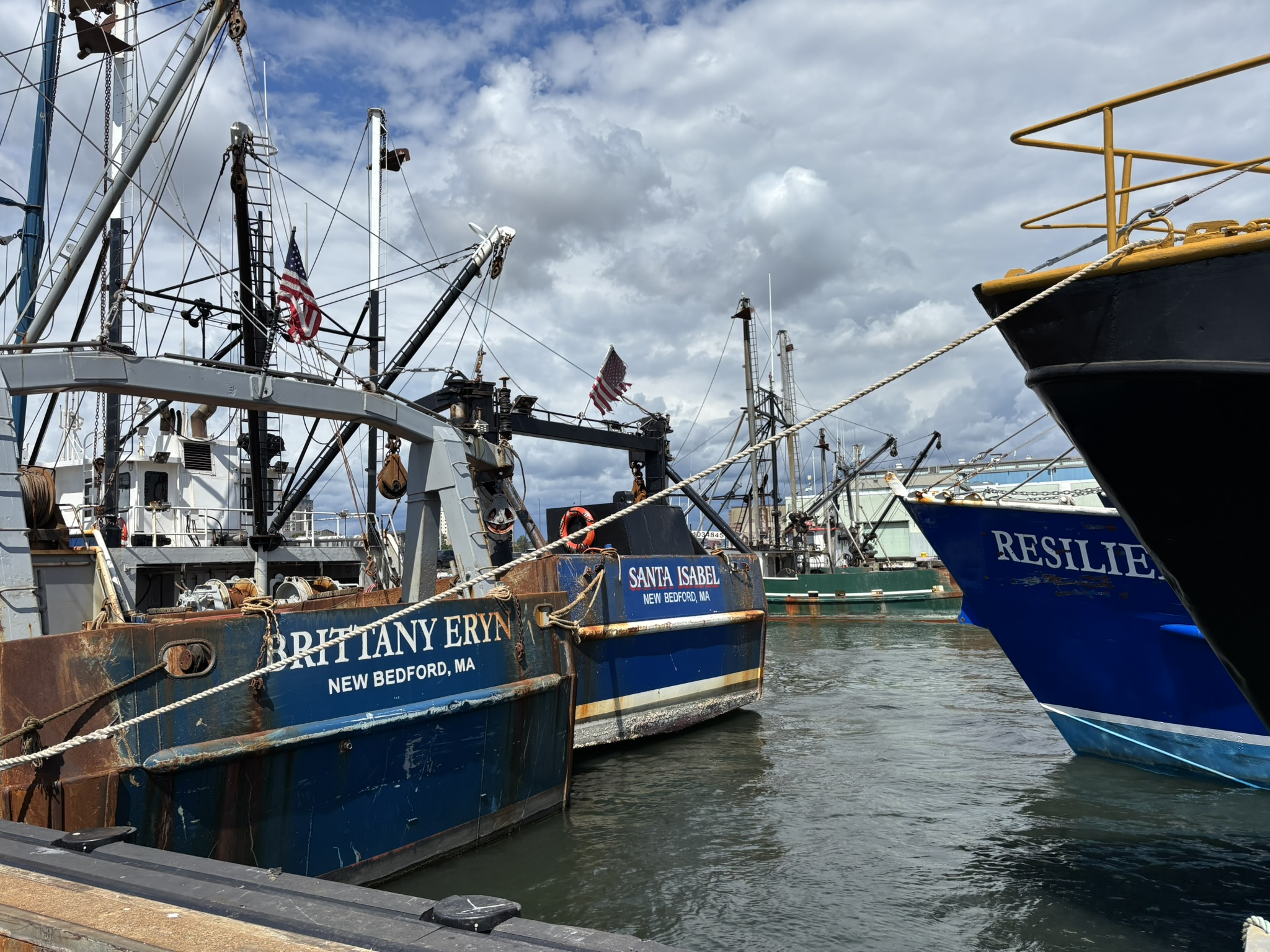
Fishing boats at the Port of New Bedford

Despite the historical decline of fishing and whaling in New England, the Port of New Bedford continues to be a leading fishing port. From 1999 to 2019, New Bedford has been the most valuable commercial fishing port in the United States. In 2019 the port's catch was worth a total of $451 million. Although New Bedford only brought in the 14th largest total volume of fish among American ports in 2019, its catch was still the highest-grossing because scallops accounted for 84% of the port's annual fishing revenue. Dutch Harbor, Alaska, has the highest volume, at 763 million pounds, worth $182 million.

=== Income ===
Data is from the 2009–2013 American Community Survey 5-Year Estimates.

Rank	ZIP Code (ZCTA)	Per capita income	Median household income	Median family income	Population	Number of households
	Massachusetts	$35,763	$66,866	$84,900	6,605,058	2,530,147
	Bristol County	$28,837	$55,298	$72,018	549,870	210,037
	United States	$28,155	$53,046	$64,719	311,536,594	115,610,216
1	North (New Bedford)	$26,093	$47,536	$57,287	24,830	10,303
	New Bedford	$21,056	$35,999	$44,607	94,927	39,068
2	02740	$20,649	$34,259	$40,508	43,308	18,028
3	South (New Bedford)	$18,190	$31,216	$40,635	11,722	4,685
4	02746	$15,948	$25,623	$32,314	14,835	5,954

== Arts and culture ==
=== Art ===
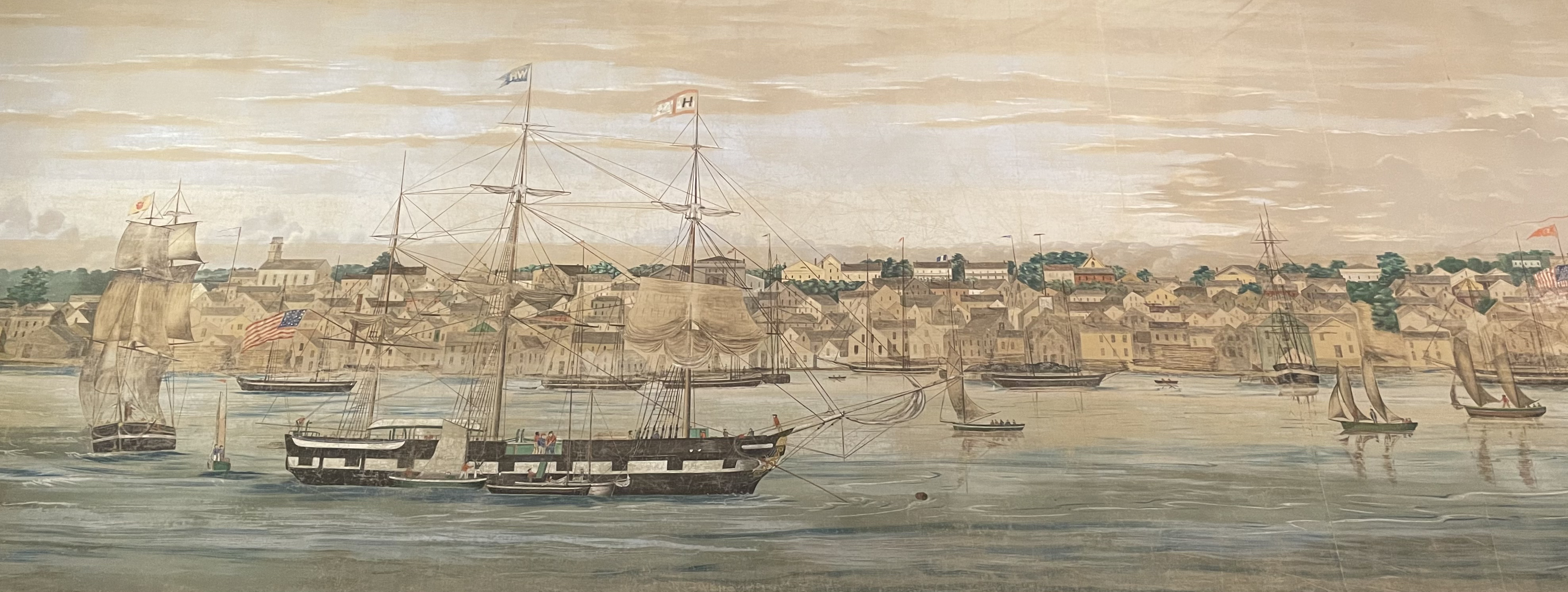
A portion of The Grand Panorama of a Whaling Voyage 'Round the World of 1848.

Benjamin Russell, Clement Nye Swift, Clifford Warren Ashley, and Albert Pinkham Ryder are notable artists from New Bedford. William Bradford, originally from Fairhaven, is another notable artist associated with New Bedford.

In 2018, the 1,275-foot (389 m) panoramic painting Grand Panorama of a Whaling Voyage Round the World by Caleb Purrington and Benjamin Russell, depicting a 19th-century whaling voyage departing from New Bedford, was displayed at the Kilburn Mill.

=== Events ===
New Bedford hosts the Feast of the Blessed Sacrament, the New Bedford Folk Festival, the Whaling City Festival, Jazzfest, Working Waterfront Festival. In addition, AHA! (Art, History, and Architecture) Nights are free cultural events held monthly in downtown New Bedford.

=== Historic districts ===
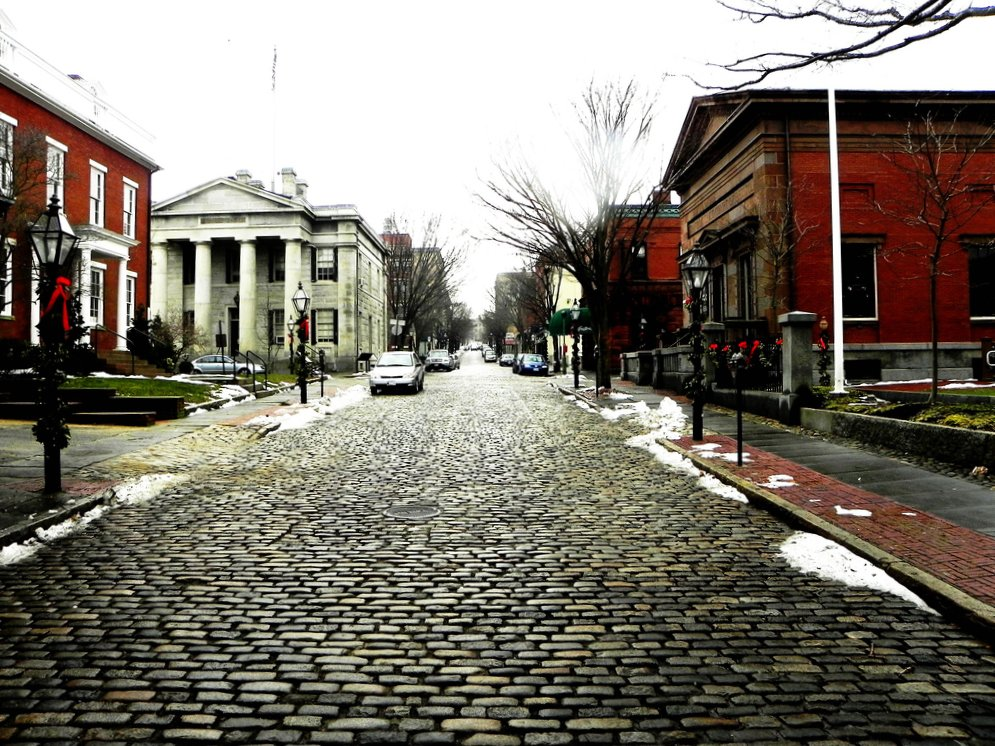
William Street in winter, looking west

New Bedford has nine historic districts on the National Register of Historic Places. They are:

- Acushnet Heights Historic District
- Buttonwood Park Historic District
- Central New Bedford Historic District
- County Street Historic District
- Howland Mill Village Historic District
- Merrill's Wharf Historic District
- Moreland Terrace Historic District
- New Bedford Historic District
- North New Bedford Historic District

=== Literature ===
Herman Melville is associated with New Bedford, with his 1851 novel Moby-Dick set in the city. The New Bedford Whaling Museum hosts an annual marathon reading of the whaling classic.

=== Museums ===
New Bedford is the home of the New Bedford Whaling Museum, the centerpiece of the New Bedford Whaling National Historical Park. It is the country's largest museum on the subject of whaling and the history of interaction between humans and whales. The museum has the skeletons of a 66-foot-long (20 m) baby blue whale (obtained in 2000), a 35-foot-long (11 m) adult humpback whale (obtained in 1900), and a 45-foot-long (14 m) sperm whale (obtained in 2004) on display. All whales died in New England waters and were cleaned and assembled for display.

The Rotch-Jones-Duff House and Garden Museum is a 28-room Greek Revival mansion that was built for the whaling merchant, William Rotch Jr., in 1834. Between 1834 and 1981, three prominent families owned the house. It was restored by the Waterfront Historic Area LeaguE (WHALE) in the early 1980s and converted into the house museum it is today, chronicling 150 years of economic, social, and domestic life in New Bedford.

The New Bedford Fire Museum is housed in a red-brick building, formerly Fire Station No. 4, which opened in 1867. The fire station was one of the oldest continuously operating fire stations in the state when it was closed in 1979. The museum has a collection of old firefighting equipment and some old fire engines. Old city fire records dating to 1890 are available for research and review. Retired and active city firefighters act as docents.

The New Bedford Museum of Glass reflects the city's history as home of the Mount Washington and Pairpoint Glass companies. The museum's collection ranges from ancient to contemporary glass with a large focus on the glass of New England. A research library contains over eight thousand volumes on glass. The museum is located in one of the historic Wamsutta Mills textile factory buildings.

=== Music ===
New Bedford has had a sporadic history of successful musicians. During the 1970s, Tavares, a Rhythm and blues group made up of five brothers from New Bedford, became a chart topping success with such songs as "Heaven Must Be Missing an Angel" and "More Than a Woman". In 1999, the pop group LFO (Lyte Funky Ones), whose group member Harold "Devin" Lima is from New Bedford, had a hit single with their song "Summer Girls". Have Heart, a Straight-edge hardcore band, were formed in New Bedford in 2002, before breaking up in 2009. Most recently, the hardcore punk band A Wilhelm Scream has gained some success, having been added to the 2005 Warped Tour lineup. New Bedford natives Hector Barros and Scott Ross were members of the hip-hop group Marky Mark and the Funky Bunch, led by actor Mark Wahlberg. They achieved success with their 1991 single, Good Vibrations, which reached number one in the U.S., Sweden, and Switzerland. Josh Newton from the band Every Time I Die was born in New Bedford.

Quinn Sullivan (born March 26, 1999) is a blues guitarist from New Bedford. Quinn has performed on stage with Buddy Guy and B.B. King and has played in venues such as the Beacon Theatre in New York City, the Orpheum Theatre in Boston, Buddy Guy's Legends in Chicago; on The Oprah Winfrey Show, NBC's The Today Show, Jimmy Kimmel Live!; and at Lollapalooza and . In April 2013 he played at Madison Square Garden with his mentor Buddy Guy during the first night of the 2013 Crossroads Guitar Festival.

The accordionist and accordion instructor Aldo DeRossi (1917–2010) composed the Whaling City Concerto in 1992, honoring New Bedford.

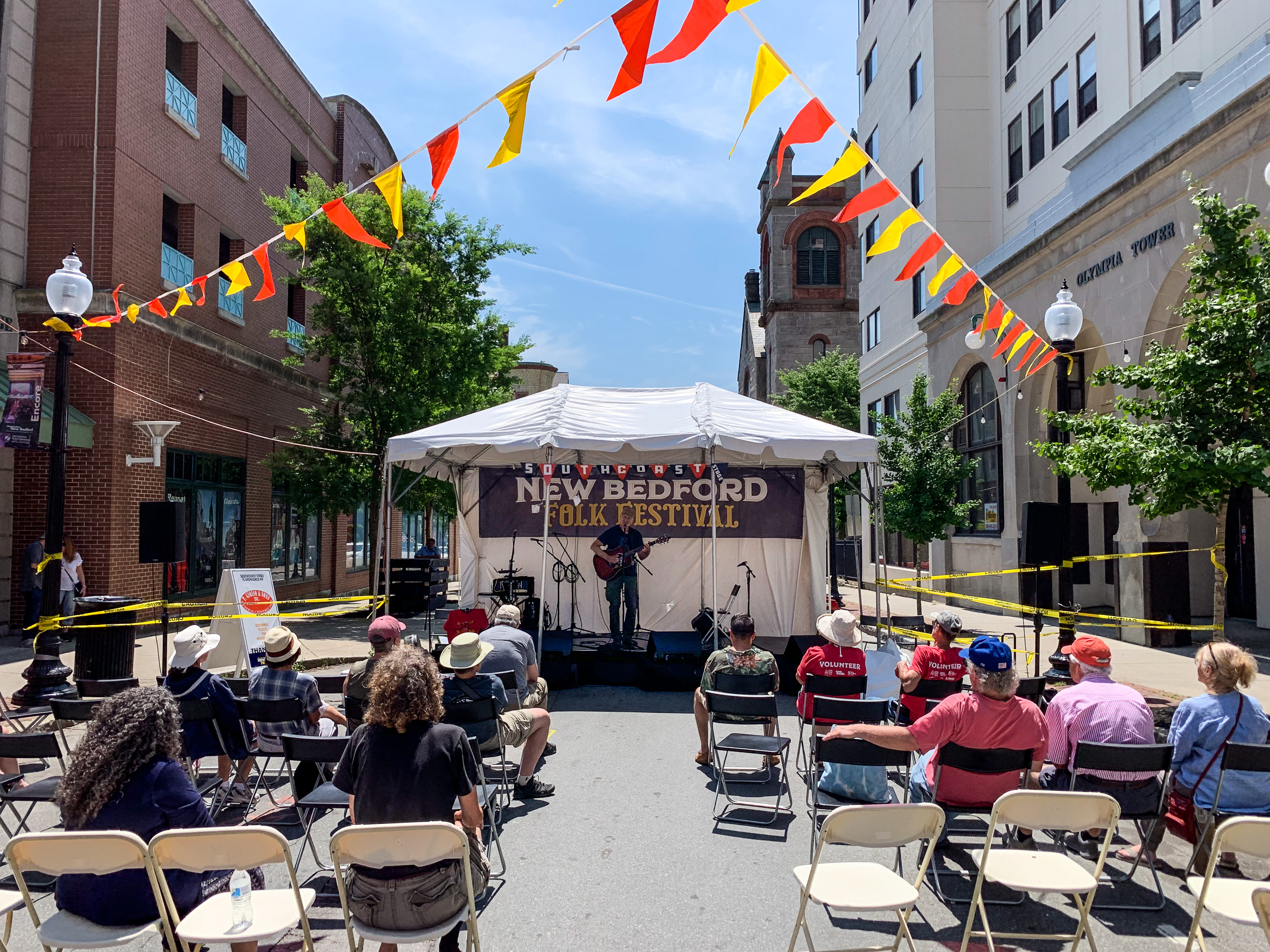
2019 New Bedford Folk Festival

The city is the home of the Zeiterion Performing Arts Center, the home venue of the New Bedford Symphony Orchestra.

Summerfest, a multi-stage folk music festival at the State Pier, was inaugurated in 1996. By 2012 the event was drawing 10,000 to 20,000 people and was rebranded as the New Bedford Folk Festival. The festival held its 25th and final event in 2022.

== Sports ==
New Bedford had a Class B level professional Baseball team called The New Bedford Whalers from 1895 to 1915. They were a member of the New England League from 1895 to 1913 and the Colonial League from 1914 to 1915. The team folded after the 1915 season. A second team called the New Bedford Millmen played for one season in 1929. A second Whalers team played in the New England League in 1933–1934.

A team from New Bedford won the 1977 edition of the Pony League World Series, defeating a team from Lake Worth, Florida, in the championship game.

Since 2009, the city has been home to the New Bedford Bay Sox baseball franchise of the New England Collegiate Baseball League, a collegiate summer baseball league operating in New England. The team, which reached the league playoffs in their inaugural season, plays home games at Paul Walsh Field in New Bedford. In 2020, the team announced they were folding for the 2020 season and hoped to return in 2021.

From 2005 to 2018, the Whaling City Clippers, a semi-professional team of the New England Football League, played at Walsh Field.

== Government ==
=== City ===
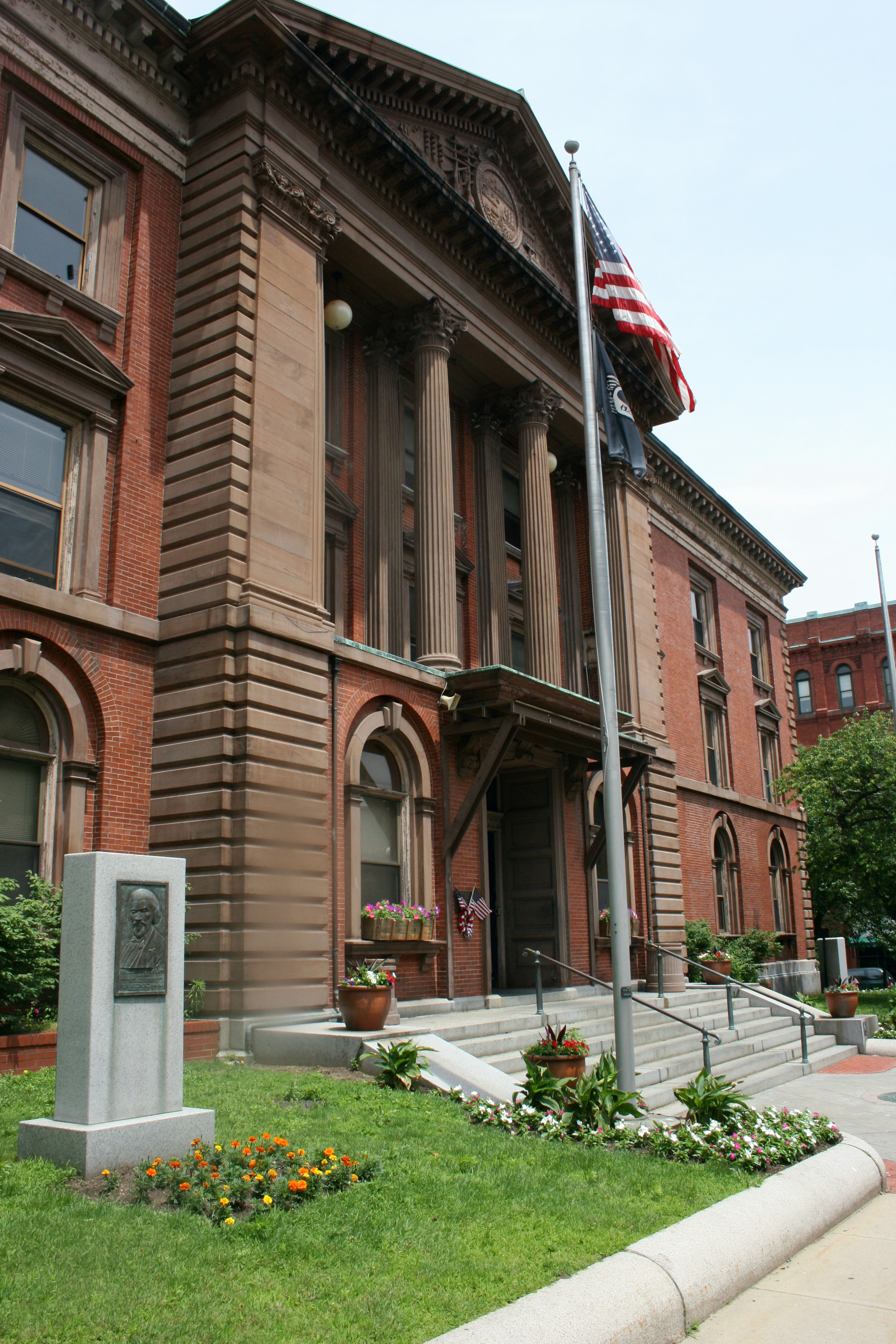
New Bedford City Hall

New Bedford is governed by a Mayor-Council form of government. City Council members serve two-year terms. In 2019, following a change in the city charter, the mayoral term was doubled from two years to four years. The council and mayoral positions do not have term limits.

Former assistant U.S. Attorney Jonathan F. Mitchell, defeated State Representative Antonio F.D. Cabral in the 2011 mayoral election. Mitchell was re-elected to his fifth consecutive term as mayor in the 2019 election, defeating challenger Tyson Moultrie.

The New Bedford Police Department patrols the city from four stations. The main station is on Rockdale Avenue in a converted supermarket plaza and replaces the former headquarters (located downtown). There are also branches in the North End (at the intersection of Tarkiln Hill Road and Ashley Boulevard), South End (along Cove Street near the end of Route 18), and Downtown (on Pleasant Street near City Hall). The Chief of Police is Joseph Cordeiro.

There are four post offices, the Central (modeled after New York's James A. Farley Post Office) located downtown, one in the South End, and two in the North End.

The city provides weekly trash and recycling pickup, and operated a trash dump in the Mount Pleasant area between the regional airport and the Whaling City Golf Course. Owing to pollution concerns, it closed in the 1990s.

=== County ===
The Bristol County Sheriff's Office operates the Ash Street Jail and Regional Lock-Up and the Juvenile Secure Alternative Lock Up Program (JALP) in New Bedford. The Ash Street jail houses over 200 pre-trial prisoners and a few sentenced inmate workers for the system. JALP houses up to 12 pre-arraignment juvenile prisoners.

=== State and federal ===
New Bedford is represented in the state legislature by officials elected from the following districts:

- Massachusetts Senate's 2nd Bristol and Plymouth district
- Massachusetts House of Representatives' 8th Bristol district
- Massachusetts House of Representatives' 9th Bristol district
- Massachusetts House of Representatives' 10th Bristol district
- Massachusetts House of Representatives' 11th Bristol district
- Massachusetts House of Representatives' 13th Bristol district

The Third Barracks of Troop D of the Massachusetts State Police, located nearby in Dartmouth, patrol New Bedford.

The city is part of Massachusetts's 9th congressional district, represented by Democrat William R. Keating. The state's junior (Class I) U.S. Senator is Democrat Ed Markey, elected in a special election in 2013. The state's senior senator is Democrat Elizabeth Warren, re-elected in 2024. The city is part of the 1st Governor's Council district, represented by Democrat Joseph Ferreira.

Voter registration and party enrollment as of October 23, 2024
Party	Number of voters	Percentage
Unenrolled	45,613	64.34%
Democrat	19,978	28.18%
Republican	4,326	6.10%
Libertarian	285	0.40%
Total	70,890	100%

Presidential election results
Year	Democratic	Republican
2024	53.0% 18,372	44.9% 15,552
2020	61.0% 21,267	37.2% 12,964
2016	62.8% 20,812	31.1% 10,327
2012	75.6% 25,253	22.6% 7,550
2008	73.4% 24,881	24.2% 8,201
2004	77.0% 25,551	22.1% 7,328
2000	77.3% 23,880	17.7% 5,473
1996	77.2% 23,620	13.6% 4,151
1992	62.7% 20,880	15.8% 5,255
1988	68.9% 22,609	30.2% 9,901
1984	62.4% 22,070	37.2% 13,147
1980	50.7% 18,014	37.2% 13,217

=== Fire department ===
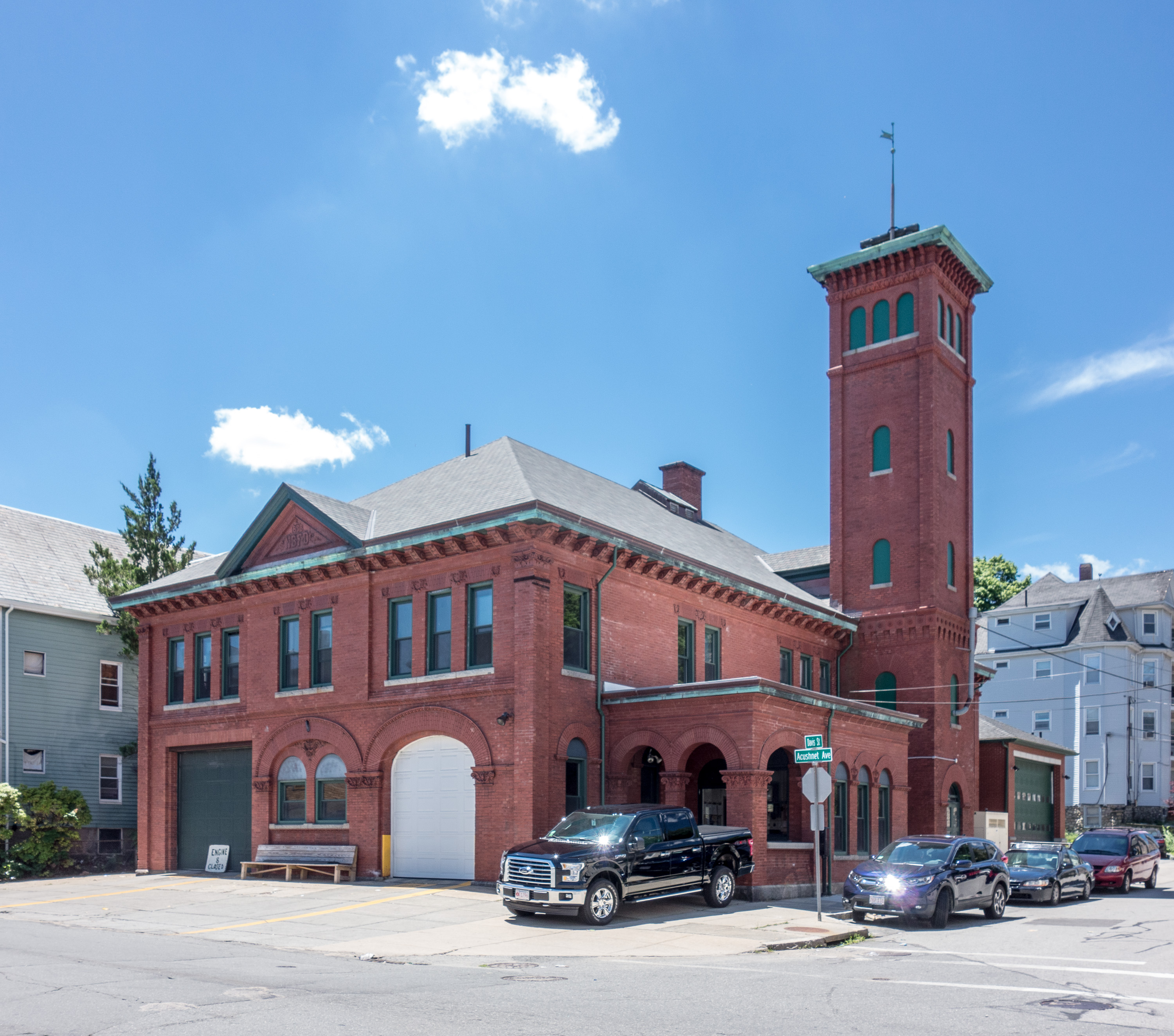
Engine 8, on Acushnet Avenue

The city of New Bedford is currently protected by the city of New Bedford Fire Department (NBFD). Established in 1834, the New Bedford Fire Department currently operates out of six Fire Stations, located throughout the city in two Districts, under the command of two District Chiefs per shift. The New Bedford Fire Department currently maintains and operates a fire apparatus fleet of six Engines, three Ladders, one Fireboat, one Air Cascade Unit, one Foam Trailer, and one ARFF Crash Rescue Unit (cross staffed by Engine 7) based at New Bedford Regional Airport and 4 reserve apparatus (3 engines, 1 ladder). The NBFD is made up of 203 full-time uniformed professional firefighters, including a Chief of department, a Deputy Chief, 10 District Chiefs, 12 Captains, 29 Lieutenants, 152 Firefighters, 4 Fire Investigators, and 5 Civilian Personnel. The New Bedford Fire Department responds to approximately 15,000 emergency calls annually.

In 2015, the New Bedford Fire Department received the "Class 1" ISO (Insurance Service Office) distinction becoming just the 3rd city in the state, Boston and Cambridge being the other two, to receive such a rating. New Bedford has been known to be a very aggressive interior attack department when responding to fire emergencies, and has been considered to be among the best in the state.

Below is a complete listing of all fire station and fire apparatus locations. In addition to the seven Fire Stations, the NBFD also operates a fire apparatus maintenance facility/repair shop at 311 Liberty St., an Emergency Management facility at 834 Kempton St., and a Fire Museum at 51 Bedford St.

Fire Headquarters is located at 868 Pleasant St. and the Fire Prevention Bureau is located at 1204 Purchase St.

Engine company	Ladder company	Special unit	Command unit	Address
Engine 1	Ladder 1	Foam Trailer and Air Cascade Unit	Unit 2 (District Chief)	868 Pleasant St.
Engine 5				3665 Acushnet Ave.
Engine 6	Ladder 3	Reserve Engine 26		Brock Ave and Ruth St.
Engine 7		Reserve Engine 21		700 Cottage St.
Engine 8	Ladder 4		Unit 1 (District Chief)	1599 Acushnet Ave.
Engine 9				799 Ashley Blvd.

=== Law enforcement ===
Law enforcement in New Bedford is provided by the New Bedford Police Department.

== Education ==
=== Public schools ===
New Bedford Public Schools is the community school district. New Bedford High School is the sole public high school in the city. New Bedford is also the home to Greater New Bedford Regional Vocational-Technical High School. The city operates two alternative junior-senior high schools, Whaling City Alternative School, out of the original Greater New Bedford Vocational High School building, and Trinity Day Academy. There are also two charter schools, the Global Learning Charter Public School, otherwise known as GLCPS, which serves grades 5–12 and two campuses of the Alma del Mar Charter School, which serves grades K–8.

=== Other schools ===
There are three Catholic schools within the city, operated by the Roman Catholic Diocese of Fall River. All Saints Catholic School was formed from a merger of the St. Mary and St. Joseph-Therese schools formed in 2010. St. Teresa of Calcutta School, located in the former St. James St. John School, was created when that school and the former Holy Family-Holy Name School merged in 2022. Some of the students who attend these schools go on to attend Bishop Stang High School in neighboring Dartmouth.

There is also the Nazarene Christian Academy, a school operated by the Church of the Nazarene. Independent schools include Nativity Prep for boys grades 5–8 and Our Sisters' School for girls grades 5–8.

=== Higher education ===
Bristol Community College has a satellite campus in downtown New Bedford in the Star Store Building and 800 Purchase Street. The town hosts the marine campus of University of Massachusetts Dartmouth at Fort Rodman as well as its satellite visual art campus in the former Star Store Building downtown.

Bridgewater State University Aviation is based at the New Bedford Regional Airport. The program is one of the only Accredited Part 141 Collegiate Aviation Universities in New England. Bachelor of Science degrees are offered in flight training and aviation management.

Additionally, the Greater New Bedford Regional Vocational-Technical High School offers adult education classes.

=== Libraries ===
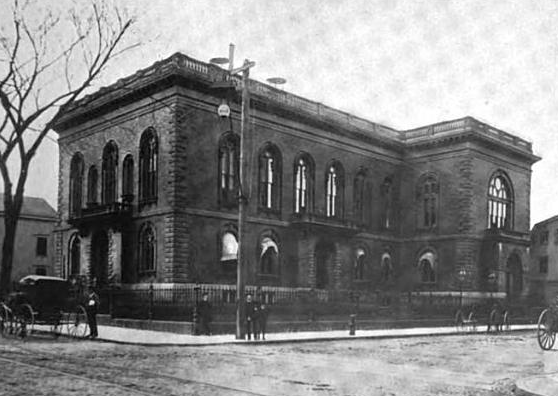
New Bedford Public Library, 1899

The New Bedford public library was established in 1852. In fiscal year 2016, the City of New Bedford spent 0.78% ($2,012,820) of its budget on its public library system—approximately $21.20 per person, per year.

- Main Library
- Casa da Saudade (Portuguese branch)
- Howland-Green Library
- Lawler Library
- Wilks Library
- Bookmobile

== Media ==
New Bedford is part of the Providence TV market but is the city of license for two TV stations; WLNE-TV Channel 6 is a de facto owned-and-operated station of the digital multicast network Roar and WLWC Channel 28 is Court TV affiliate. The Portuguese Channel has its corporate offices and studios in the city at 638 Mount Pleasant Street in the Comcast building.

The city is home to three radio stations: FM stations WJFD-FM/97.3 (Portuguese-language) and WCTK-FM/98.1, and WNBH-AM/1340 and WBSM-AM/1420. All four have served the residents of New Bedford for many decades, and WCTK also serves Providence. Much of the city also receives Providence and Boston stations.

The city is served by the New Bedford Standard-Times and The Portuguese Times newspapers.

In 2021, the "New Bedford Light" was created as a free non-profit digital news site, featuring investigative and enterprise reporting to augment what had been a local news media environment in decades-long decline.

== Transportation ==
=== Water ===
The Port of New Bedford is a major harbor for freight and passenger services, generating over $9.8 billion in economic value annually. The port serves as a break-bulk handler of perishable items, including fruit, fish, and a variety other cargo. The port is also a frequent stop for cruise ships, expecting an upwards of thirty cruise ship calls in 2006. One public and several private marinas offer limited transient dockage for recreational boats.

A handful of private ferry services also originate from New Bedford. One such company, SeaStreak, offers catamaran fast ferry service to Oak Bluffs and Vineyard Haven, both in Martha's Vineyard, as well as Nantucket. A separate passenger line, the Cuttyhunk Ferry Company, runs scheduled ferry services from New Bedford to Cuttyhunk Island. The neighboring town of Fall River is served by seasonal services to Newport and Block Island, both in the state of Rhode Island. The history of ferry service from New Bedford dates back to May 15, 1818, when a steamboat entitled The Eagle carried six hundred passengers across the Nantucket Sound.

New Bedford has historically been a major city for whaling and commercial fishing, and remains an important site for the latter to this day. As of 2020, the Port of New Bedford is the number one fishing port in the United States, in terms of dollar value of catch. New Bedford fisherman landed 124 million pounds of fish in 2015, valued at $322 million, and the fishing industry accounts for the vast majority of the Port's annual economic value.

=== Air ===
New Bedford Regional Airport (EWB), a towered Class D airport offering two 5,400-foot (1,600 m) runways and a precision Instrument Landing System, is located in the central portion of the city with easy access to major highways.

Frequent scheduled passenger service is provided to Nantucket and Martha's Vineyard by Cape Air and Southern Airways Express. As of 2020, New Bedford Regional Airport serves as the New England Fleet Base for Southern Airways Express, providing maintenance, storage, and offices for the airline.

In addition, the airport provides a wide range of general aviation and corporate jet services, including aircraft maintenance, fuel, and part 61 flight instruction.

=== Roads ===
Interstate 195 is the main freeway through central New Bedford, traveling from Providence, Rhode Island, to Wareham. Additionally, U.S. Route 6 runs from east to west through the city as well. US 6 leaves the city toward Cape Cod over the New Bedford-Fairhaven Bridge, a swing truss bridge, and the Popes Island Bridge. New Bedford also serves as the southern terminus of MA Route 140, which is a freeway that connects to MA Route 24 in Taunton on the road north to Boston. MA Route 18, the extension of the John F. Kennedy Memorial Highway (which travels through downtown), is a freeway for the short stretch connecting I-195 to US 6 and the port area.

=== Bus ===
The city bus terminal offers local and long-distance bus connections. A free shuttle bus connects the bus terminal and the ferries. The Southeastern Regional Transit Authority (SRTA) provides bus service between the city, Fall River, and the surrounding regions.

Peter Pan Bus Lines makes a New Bedford stop on a New York City to Hyannis (Cape Cod) route. As of October 2006, private carrier DATTCO provides daily commuter bus service to Boston via Taunton.

=== Rail ===
Two stations in New Bedford – New Bedford station and Church Street station – are served by the Fall River/New Bedford Line of the MBTA Commuter Rail system. The Massachusetts Coastal Railroad provides freight rail service to New Bedford, terminating at the New Bedford Rail Yard in the port area. It also operates the Watuppa Branch, which runs from New Bedford to Westport.

== Notable people ==
- Cheryl Ann Araujo (March 28, 1961 – December 14, 1986) A New Bedford resident and victim of a violent gang-rape at the now closed Big Dan's Bar at the age of 21. Her case would attract international attention due to being televised. Araujo died just four years later at the age of 25 in a car accident in Miami, Florida. Her rape case would inspire the plotline for the 1988 motion picture The Accused starring actress Jodie Foster.
- Clifford Warren Ashley, author, sailor, and artist, most famous for The Ashley Book of Knots, an encyclopedic reference manual, copiously illustrated, on the tying of thousands of knots. Invented Ashley's stopper knot
- Joseph "The Animal" Barboza, mob hitman
- Paul Cuffe, Merchant and ship's captain of African and Native American ancestry who settled in nearby Westport, Massachusetts, and operated ships out of New Bedford.
- Lewis Temple, African-American blacksmith and inventor of the toggle iron harpoon, which revolutionized the whaling industry.
- William Harvey Carney, Union soldier in the 54th Massachusetts Infantry Regiment during the American Civil War.
- Patrick Cunningham, Irish immigrant and inventor known for constructing and test-firing a torpedo on a New Bedford street.
- Merton J. Batchelder, Marine Corps Brigadier general during World War II, recipient of Navy Cross
- Fred Beardsworth, association football player
- André Bernier, first meteorologist to appear on The Weather Channel's debut on May 2, 1982
- Albert Bierstadt, 19th-century German-born artist who depicteds of the American West
- Ezell A. Blair Jr. (later known as Jibreel Khazan) civil rights activist best known for participation in the Greensboro sit-ins
- Millicent Borges Accardi, poet and recipient of a National Endowment for the Arts fellowship family roots in New Bedford's Portuguese community
- Franklin Brownell (1857–1946), painter, draughtsman, and teacher
- William Harvey Carney, American soldier during the American Civil War and recipient of the Medal of Honor
- Paul Clayton, folksinger
- Frederick Douglass, 19th-century abolitionist and editor
- Lewis Henry Douglass, Union Army African-American Sergeant Major who fought in the American Civil War at the Second Battle of Fort Wagner under the 54th Massachusetts Infantry Regiment. Also, son of Frederick Douglass, an abolitionist
- William Edgar Easton, playwright and journalist
- Nelson Eddy, singer and movie star who appeared in 19 musical films during the 1930s and 1940s, spent part of his boyhood in New Bedford
- William Greenleaf Eliot, co-founder and benefactor of Washington University in St. Louis; grandfather of T. S. Eliot
- Elizabeth Piper Ensley, educator, suffragette, and activist
- Marie Equi, 19th-century doctor, labor activist, anarchist and Wobbly
- Keith Francis, middle-distance runner, NCAA Champion and 7-time NCAA All American at Boston College
- Paul Gonsalves, jazz tenor saxophonist best known for his association with Duke Ellington
- Hetty Green, businesswoman, one of the wealthiest women in America; amassed a significant fortune from the stock market in the late 19th century
- Henry Grinnell, businessman; financed the outfitting of two vessels, the "Advance" and the "Rescue", to search the Arctic for the lost Franklin Expedition
- Carol Haney, choreographer, principal assistant to Gene Kelly, worked on Singin' in the Rain
- Brian Helgeland, screenwriter of Mystic River, Conspiracy Theory, and L.A. Confidential, director of A Knight's Tale and 42
- William Jackson, Baptist minister, abolitionist, chaplain of the 55th Massachusetts Infantry Regiment in 1863
- Irwin M. Jacobs, co-founder of Qualcomm
- Samantha Johnson, singer
- Tynisha Keli (born 1985), singer
- Joe Lacob, owner of the Golden State Warriors of the National Basketball Association
- Rebecca Hammond Lard, first poet of Indiana
- George N. Leighton, United States District Court judge
- Dave Leitao, basketball head coach for DePaul
- Léo Major, Canadian Soldier
- William Foster Nye (1824–1910), businessman
- William and Amelia Piper, saved by members of New Bedford, they were abolitionists and conductors on the Underground Railroad
- Paul Poirier, former New England heavyweight boxing champion
- Brian Pothier, professional ice hockey player currently playing for the Carolina Hurricanes
- Ben Powers (1950–2015), actor
- Benjamin Russell, artist, best known for his accurate watercolors of whaling ships
- Albert Pinkham Ryder, 19th-century painter best known for his poetic and moody allegorical works and seascapes, as well as his eccentric personality
- Laurie Santos (born 1975), professor at Yale University and TED speaker
- Jared Shuster (born 1998), MLB pitcher, first round 2020 MLB draft pick
- Lois Tripp Slocum (1899–1951), astronomer
- Pete Souza, Chief Official White House Photographer under Barack Obama
- Harry Stovey, 19th-century professional baseball player; born in Philadelphia, he became a police officer in New Bedford after his playing days
- Quinn Sullivan (born 1999), musician
- Jordan Todman (born 1990), NFL player
- Benjamin Tucker, individualist-anarchist author
- John Tukey, statistician whose usage of the term "software" and "bit" are believed to be the first in written history
- Bobby Watkins, professional football player for the Chicago Bears and Chicago Cardinals in the 1950s
- Benjamin F. White, last governor of Montana Territory
- William R. Yeschek, businessman and politician

== In popular culture ==
In 2002, the movie Passionada was filmed in New Bedford, making it the first film to be shot in the city in 45 years. Previously, film director John Huston shot a scene for the movie adaptation of Moby-Dick in front of Seamen's Bethel in 1956. All other exterior shots were made in Youghal instead.

The 2011 movie Whaling City, about the fight of an independent fisherman to save his boat and his way of life, is set in New Bedford and was filmed there.

New Bedford was the town where 100 brides in the 1968–1970 TV series Here Come the Brides came from prior to their arrival in 1860s Seattle, Washington.

A character named New Bedford appeared on a Family Guy episode (in 2006) as a friend of another girl named Dakota. The show's fictional setting of Quahog, Rhode Island, is situated near New Bedford. In the tenth-season premiere "Lottery Fever", Peter Griffin mentions New Bedford while looking at scrimshaw of a whale sinking a whaling ship.

A board game set in the town called New Bedford was published in 2016. It focuses on building the town and the whaling industry.

In 2023, the movie Finestkind took place in New Bedford and Fairhaven, Massachusetts. The film was written and directed by Brian Helgeland and starring Ben Foster, Toby Wallace, Jenna Ortega and Tommy Lee Jones.

== Sister cities ==
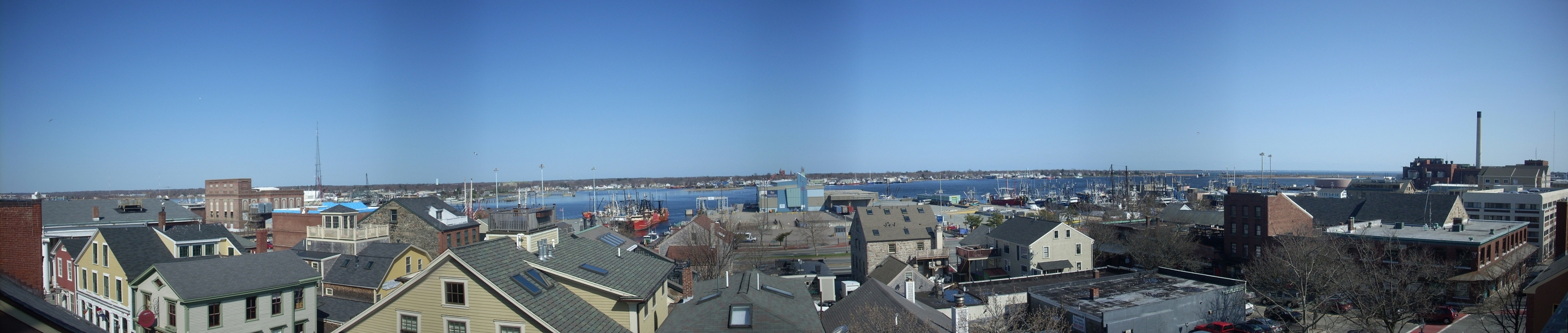
The port of New Bedford

New Bedford's sister cities are:

- Utqiagvik, United States
- Cuxhaven, Germany
- Derry, Northern Ireland, United Kingdom
- Grimsby, England, United Kingdom
- Figueira da Foz, Portugal
- Funchal, Portugal
- Horta, Portugal
- Ílhavo, Portugal
- Tosashimizu, Japan
- (Republic of Ireland) Youghal, Ireland

== See also ==
- Catalpa rescue
- Leviathan (2012 film)
- List of historic houses in Massachusetts
- List of mayors of New Bedford, Massachusetts
- List of mill towns in Massachusetts
- List of mills in New Bedford, Massachusetts
- The Whaleman - A monument in New Bedford
