= Greystone =

Greystone or Graystone may refer to:

== Locations ==
=== Historic buildings ===
- Greystone Castle, historic house in Reno, Nevada
- Greystone Cellars, historic Napa County stone wine cellars
- Greystone (Durham, North Carolina), historic house built in 1911
- Grey Stone Baptist Church, Durham, North Carolina
- Greystone (Harrodsburg, Kentucky), a 1931 historic house listed on the NRHP in Mercer County, Kentucky
- Greystone House, 1740s listed house in Devizes, Wiltshire, UK
- Greystone (Knoxville), an NRHP-listed house in Knoxville, Tennessee
- Graystone Manor, alternative name for Graystone Pines
- Greystone Mansion, historic Californian house in Beverly Hills
- Gustave Greystone-Meissner House, historic house in Pevely, Missouri
- Graystone Pines, Salt Lake City; the first condominium built in the continental United States
- Greystone Park Psychiatric Hospital, a Kirkbride Plan "lunatic asylum in Parsippany-Troy Hills Township, New Jersey
- Greystone Villa, Cabin 18, historic building in the Santa Ana Mountains, California

=== Historic districts ===
- Greystone Historic District, a North Providence, Rhode Island district encompassing the early 20th-century village of Greystone
- Greystone Mill Historic District, a Johnston, Rhode Island, and North Providence, Rhode Island, district containing an historic textile-mill complex
- Greystone (estate), historic estate, remnants of which are now a public park in Yonkers, New York

=== Other locations ===
- Greystone Airport, a private airport in Ocala, Florida
- Greystone Golf & Country Club, a private golf course in Birmingham, Alabama
- Greystone (Metro-North station), a railroad station in Westchester County, New York
- Greystone, Yonkers, a neighborhood in Northwest Yonkers, New York
- Greystone, West Virginia, an unincorporated community in Monongalia County

== Other uses ==
- Greystone (architecture), a style of buildings faced in grey limestone
- Greystone Park, a 2012 American film
- Greystone Ltd, a private military contracting firm
- Greystone (CIA operation), alleged umbrella operation for covert actions by the CIA in the Middle East after the September 11 attacks
- The Culinary Institute of America at Greystone (originally Greystone Cellars), a culinary college branch campus

== See also ==
- Greystones (disambiguation)
- Grey Stone
