= Frank P. Sheldon =

American mill engineer (1846–1915)

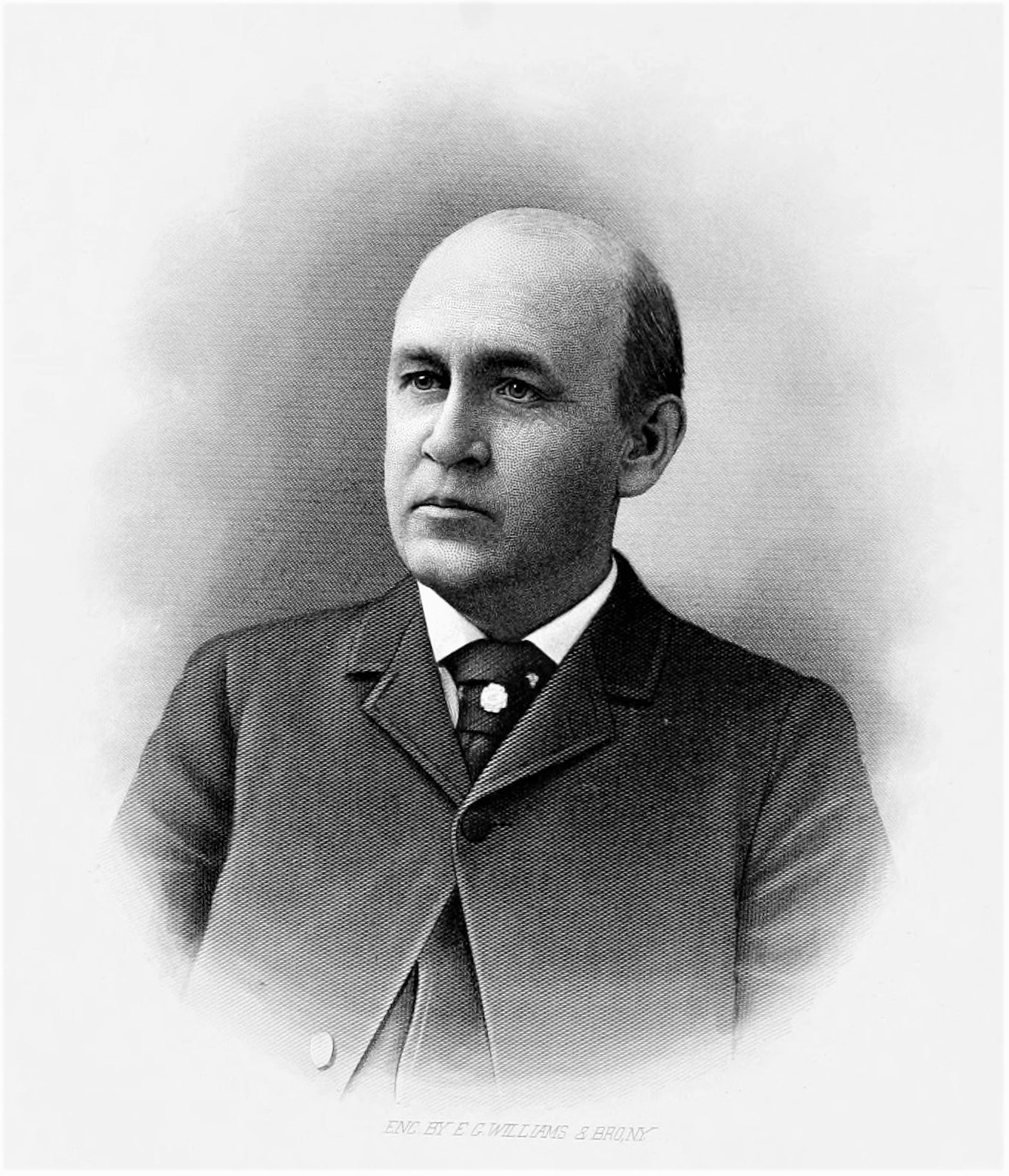
- Sheldon, c. 1911
- Born: February 16, 1846; Providence, Rhode Island, United States
- Died: August 17, 1915 (aged 69); Providence, Rhode Island, United States
- Occupation: Mill engineer

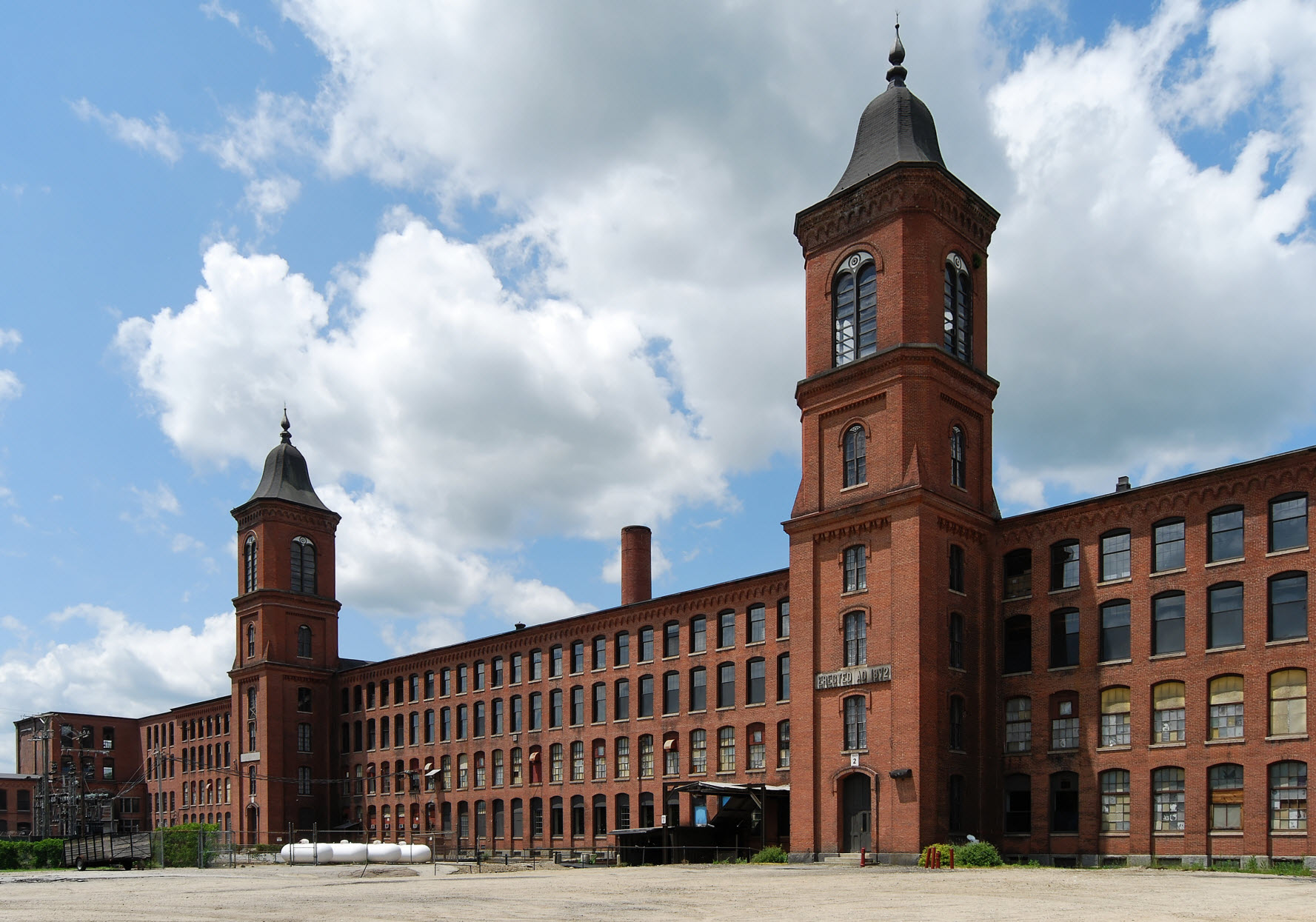
The North Grosvenordale Mill in Thompson, Connecticut, completed in 1872

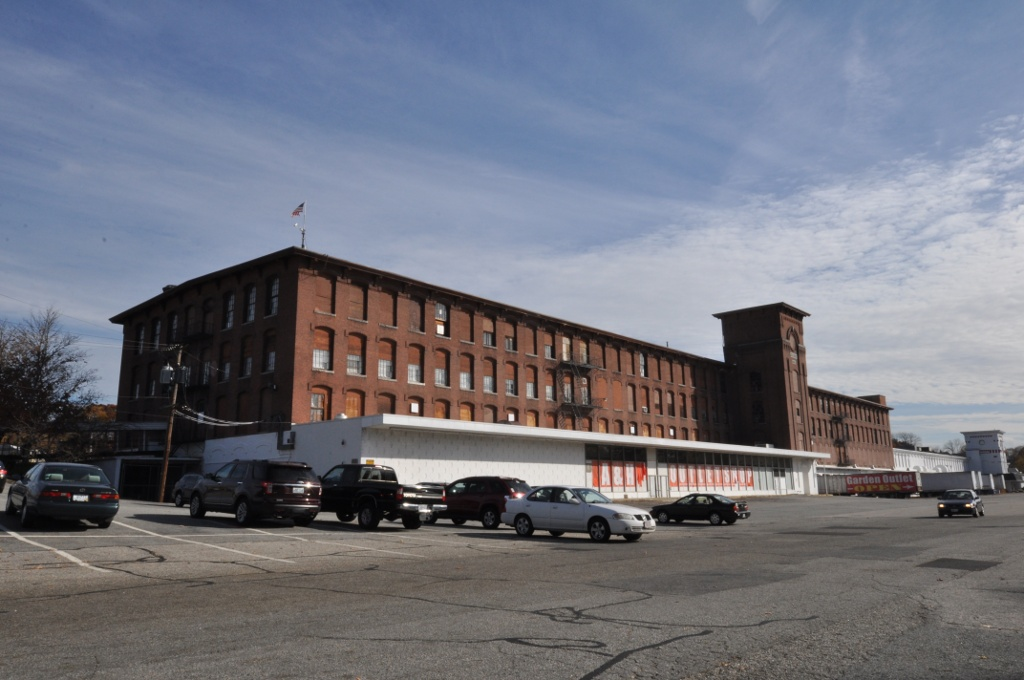
The Ann & Hope Mill in Cumberland, Rhode Island, completed in 1886

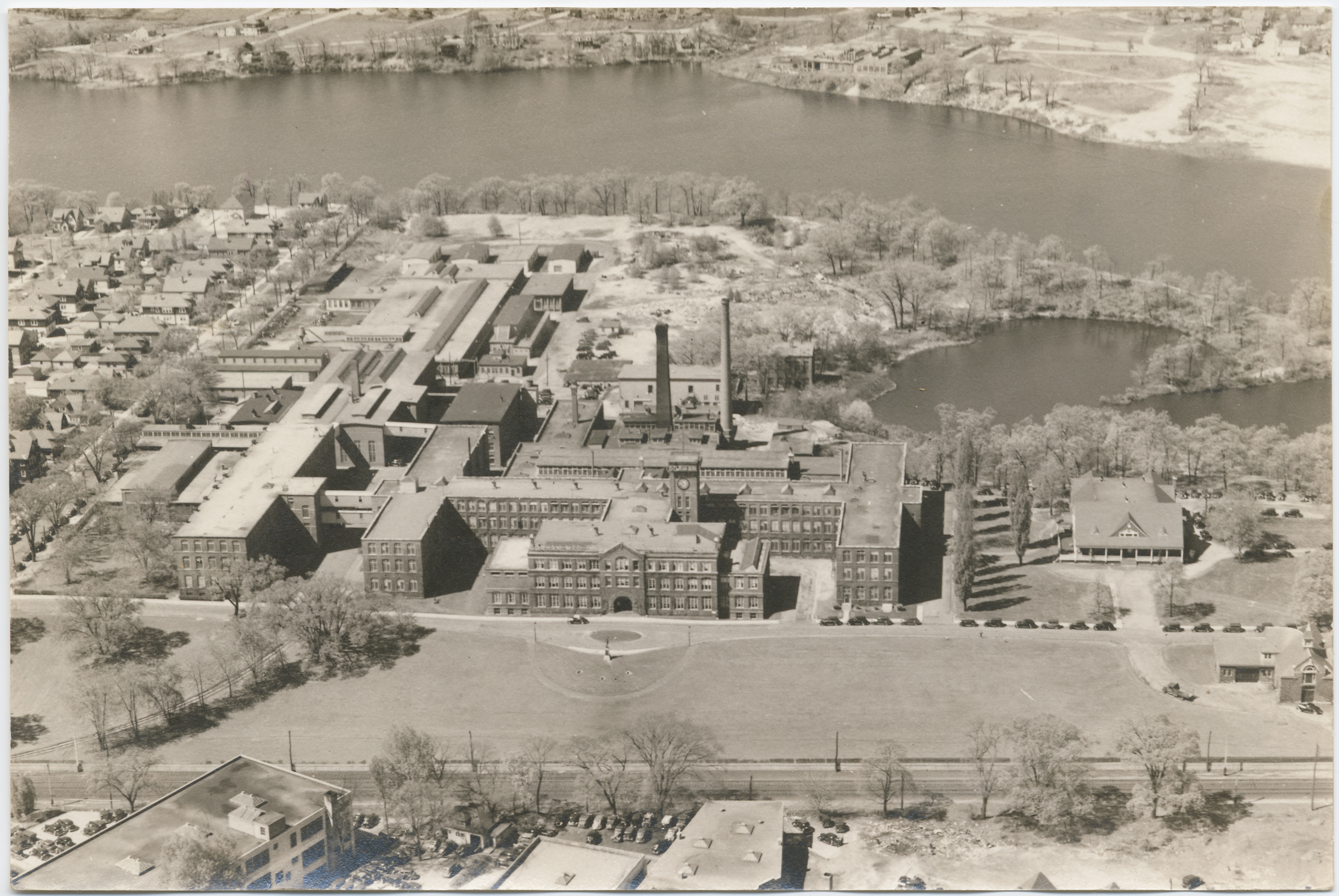
The Gorham Manufacturing Company works in Providence, completed in 1890 and demolished in 1998

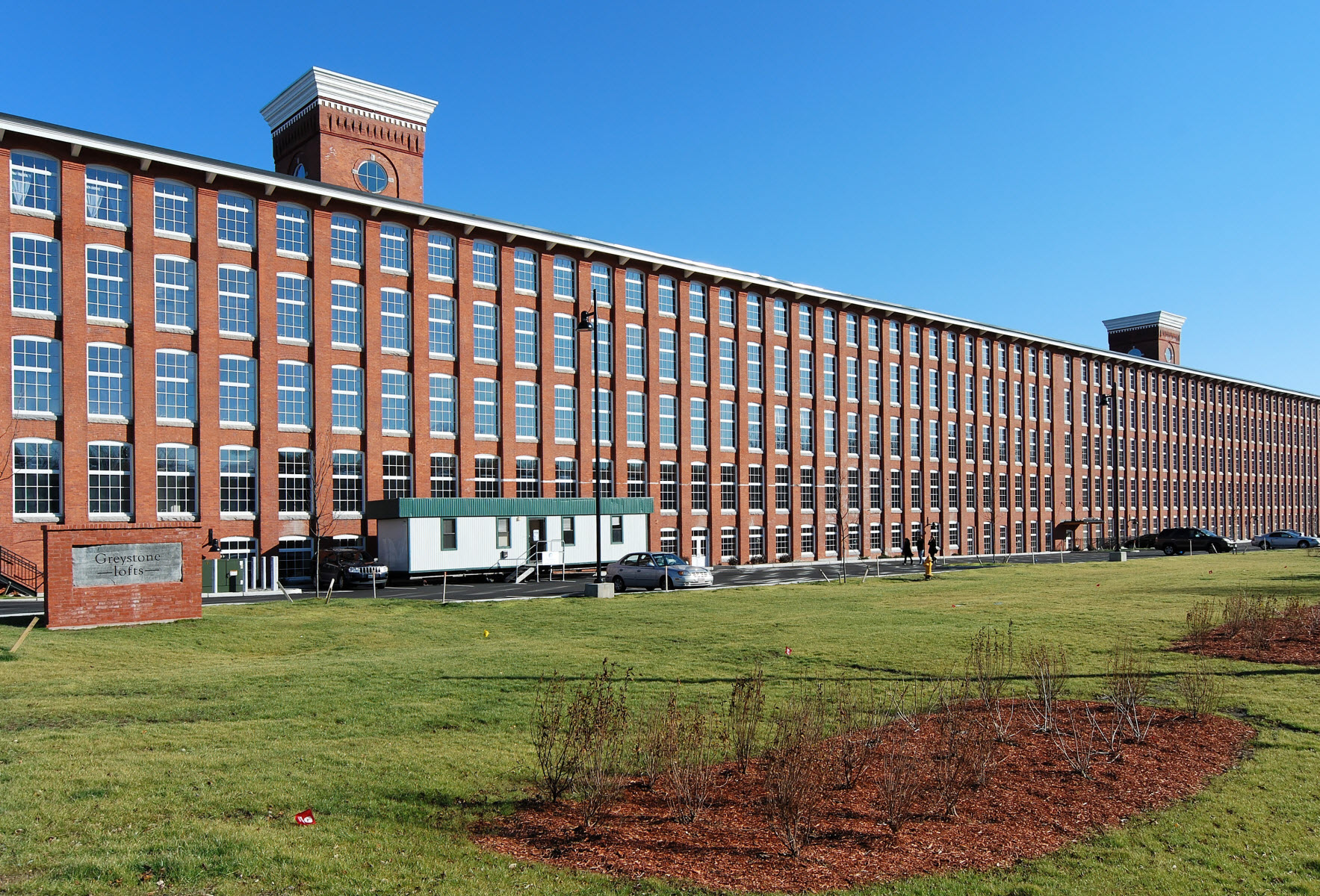
The Greystone Mills in North Providence, Rhode Island, completed in phases beginning in 1904

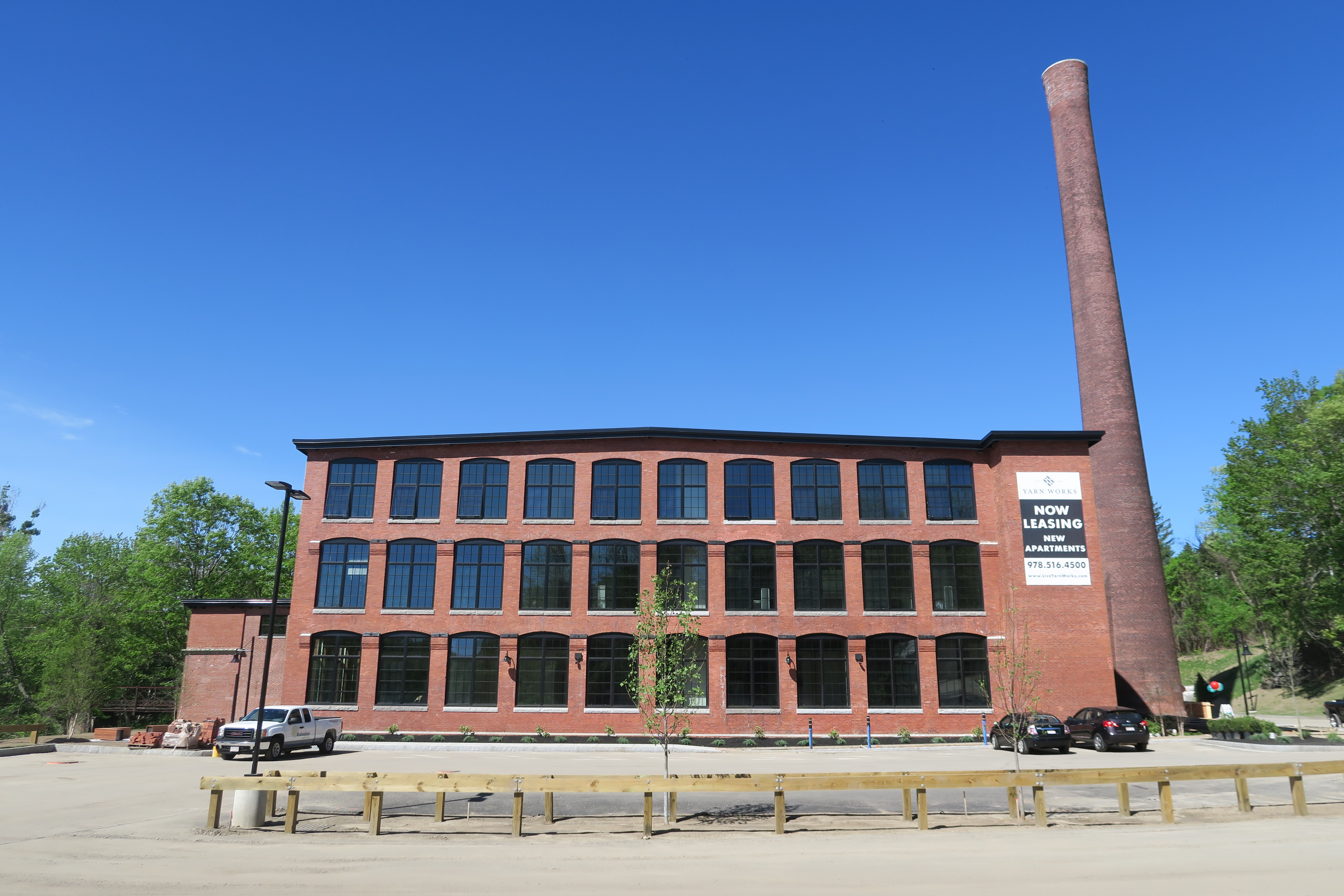
The Fitchburg Yarn Mill in Fitchburg, Massachusetts, completed in 1907

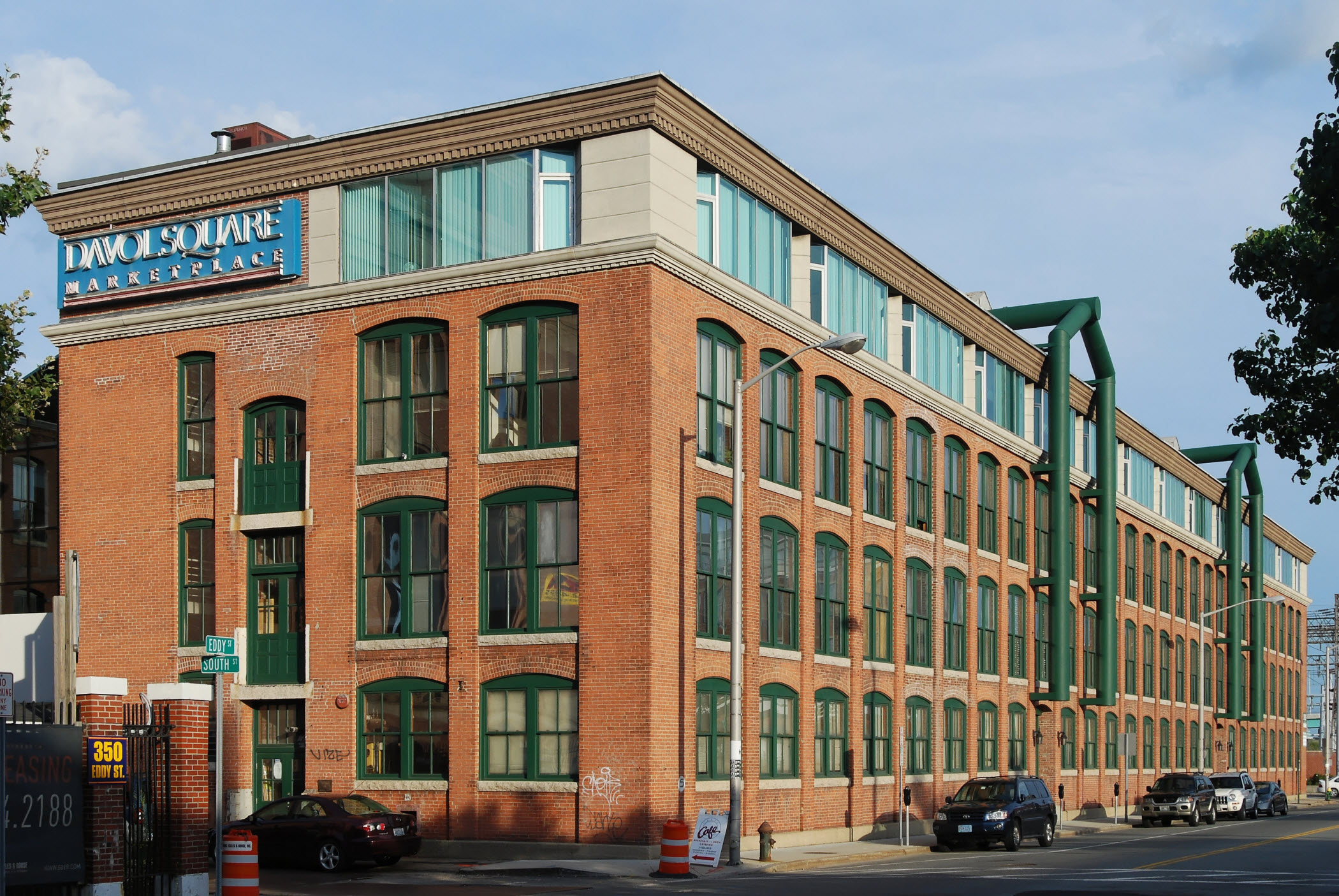
The Eddy Street building of the Davol Rubber Company, completed in 1913

Frank P. Sheldon (February 16, 1846 – August 17, 1915) was an American mill engineer based in Providence, Rhode Island, and active from 1870 until his death in 1915. In his capacity as a mill engineer Sheldon designed cotton mills and factories for a variety of industries.

== Life and career ==
Frank Perry Sheldon was born February 16, 1846, in Providence, Rhode Island, to Jeremiah A. Sheldon, a patternmaker, and Mary Sheldon, née Burbank. He was educated in the Providence public schools and at Scholfield's Commercial College. He first worked in the office of Providence civil engineer Niles B. Schubarth. He then worked as a mechanical draftsman for his father's employer, the American Screw Company, and in the machine shops of James S. Brown in Pawtucket. On Brown's recommendation Sheldon then went to work for Foster H. Stafford, treasurer of the Union Mills of Fall River, Massachusetts, for whom he drew the plans of the company's no. 2 mill. He then worked for Edward Kilburn, engineer of the Lonsdale Company at Lonsdale, Rhode Island, and with him designed the no. 4 mill of the Wamsutta Mills in New Bedford.

By 1870 Sheldon felt comfortable enough to go into business independently as a mill engineer. The idea of a "mill engineer" developed alongside the American textile industry and was at this time only just being professionalized. Such an engineer was responsible for the design of all of a mill's machinery and systems as well as the building that housed those systems. Some of these engineers, including Sheldon, carried out the original research required to provide these services. He was sole proprietor of his business until 1903, when he formed a partnership with his elder son, Arthur Noyes Sheldon (1878–1973), practicing as F. P. Sheldon & Company. In 1907 they were joined by his younger son, Frank Lawrence Sheldon (1883–1925), and the firm name changed to F. P. Sheldon & Sons. After Sheldon died in 1915, his sons continued the firm under the name F. P. Sheldon & Son. Frank L. Sheldon died in 1925, but Arthur N. Sheldon continued to lead the firm under the same name until his retirement in 1964.

== Personal life ==
In 1900 Sheldon was appointed director of textiles for the United States Commission to the Exposition Universelle in Paris. He was a member of the American Society of Mechanical Engineers and the National Cotton Manufacturers' Association.

Sheldon married in 1877 to Nellie Noyes. They had three children, two sons and one daughter. She died in 1883 and he married again in 1892, to Mary Elizabeth Lincoln, they had no children together. He died August 17, 1915, at the age of 69, in Providence.

== Legacy ==
Sheldon's employees included Charles T. Main and Dwight Seabury, who left to establish their own practices in 1893 and 1896, respectively.

In 1921 the firm published a retrospective, entitled A Half Century of Achievement, to commemorate the firm's fiftieth year of business. This book also contained summaries of the firm's research. Research activities were covered more thoroughly in the 1926 publication Miscellaneous Scientific Papers of F. P. Sheldon & Son, comprising papers presented by members of the firm. In 1923 Sheldon & Son was recognized as one of the major mill engineering firms of the United States.

Many of Sheldon's works survive and several have been listed on the United States National Register of Historic Places; others contribute to listed historic districts.

== Projects ==
All dates are date of completion.

- 1872: North Grosvenordale Mill, North Grosvenordale village, Thompson, Connecticut
  - Contributes to the NRHP-listed North Grosvenordale Mill Historic District
- 1873: King Philip Mills, Fall River, Massachusetts
  - NRHP-listed
- 1883: Paramount Knitting Company Mill, Beaver Dam, Wisconsin
  - NRHP-listed
- 1886: Ann & Hope Mill, Lonsdale village, Cumberland, Rhode Island
  - Sheldon also completed the attached Lonsdale Mill in 1901; both contribute to the NRHP-listed Lonsdale Historic District
- 1889: Berkshire Mill No. 1, Adams, Massachusetts
  - NRHP-listed
- 1890: Cornell Mills, Fall River, Massachusetts
  - NRHP-listed
- 1890: Gorham Manufacturing Company works, Providence, Rhode Island
  - Demolished in 1998
- 1894: Queen City Cotton Mill, Burlington, Vermont
  - Contributes to the NRHP-listed Lakeside Development historic district
- 1896: Jesse Metcalf Building, Providence, Rhode Island
  - As of 2026, occupied by the Rhode Island Department of Children, Youth & Families; contributes resource to the NRHP-listed Downtown Providence Historic District
- 1896: Warren Manufacturing Company mills, Warren, Rhode Island
  - As of 2026, an apartment complex known as the Tourister Mills, after later occupant American Tourister
- 1903: Avondale Mills, Pell City, Alabama
  - Burned in 2006 during demolition; formerly contributed to the Avondale Mill Historic District
- 1904: Greystone Mills, Greystone village, North Providence, Rhode Island
  - Contributes to the NRHP-listed Greystone Mill Historic District
- 1906: J. & P. Coats power plant, Central Falls, Rhode Island
  - As of 2026, incorporated into the Rand Place Apartments; contributes to the NRHP-listed Conant Thread-Coats & Clark Mill Complex District
- 1907: Esmond Mill, Esmond village, Smithfield, Rhode Island
- 1907: Fitchburg Yarn Mill, Fitchburg, Massachusetts
  - NRHP-listed
- 1907: Greenhalgh Mill, Pawtucket, Rhode Island
  - The last large mill built in Pawtucket; burned in 2003
- 1911: Whitehall Building, Greystone village, North Providence, Rhode Island
  - Contributes to the NRHP-listed Greystone Historic District
- 1913: Davol Rubber Company Eddy Street building, Providence, Rhode Island
  - NRHP-listed
- 1915: Gardner Building, Providence, Rhode Island
  - Significantly enlarged in 1925; contributes to the NRHP-listed Downtown Providence Historic District

== Bibliography ==
- A Half Century of Achievement (Providence: F. P. Sheldon & Son, 1921)
- Miscellaneous Scientific Papers of F. P. Sheldon & Son (Providence: F. P. Sheldon & Son, 1926)
