= National Register of Historic Places listings in North Providence, Rhode Island =

This is a list of Registered Historic Places in North Providence, Rhode Island.

Contents: Counties in Rhode Island

Bristol | Kent | Newport | Providence (Pawtucket | Providence (city) | Woonsocket) | Washington

This National Park Service list is complete through NPS recent listings posted April 17, 2026.

	Name on the Register	Image	Date listed	Location	City or town	Description
1	Allendale Mill	Allendale Mill	May 7, 1973 (#73000063)	494 Woonasquatucket Ave. 41°51′00″N 71°28′51″W	North Providence	
2	Greystone Historic District	Greystone Historic District	January 2, 2008 (#07001343)	1-16 Beckside Rd., 1-29 Greystone Ave., 1-24 Oakleigh Ave., 1-40 Langsberries Ave., 2-20 Larchmount Ave N, 1-16 S... 41°52′02″N 71°29′24″W	North Providence and Johnston	Mill complex and associated village and housing area
3	Greystone Mill Historic District	Greystone Mill Historic District	April 28, 2004 (#04000378)	Greystone Ave. 41°51′53″N 71°29′28″W	North Providence and Johnston	Mill complex along the Woonasquatucket River
4	Lymansville Company Mill	Lymansville Company Mill	December 26, 2012 (#12001098)	184 Woonasquatucket Ave. 41°50′21″N 71°28′32″W	North Providence	
5	Capt. Stephen Olney House	Capt. Stephen Olney House	May 1, 1974 (#74000003)	138 Smithfield Rd. 41°51′19″N 71°27′05″W	North Providence	
6	Joseph Smith House	Joseph Smith House	November 28, 1978 (#78000009)	109 Smithfield Rd. 41°51′22″N 71°27′00″W	North Providence	
7	Whipple-Angell-Bennett House	Whipple-Angell-Bennett House	July 28, 1995 (#95000917)	157 Olney Ave. 41°50′57″N 71°27′54″W	North Providence	

== See also ==
- National Register of Historic Places listings in Providence County, Rhode Island
- List of National Historic Landmarks in Rhode Island
