= NPHS =

NPHS is an initialism which may stand for:

- National Public Health Service, A government health organisation in Wales.

U.S. High schools

- North Port High School, a public high school in North Port, Florida
- New Paltz High School, a public high school in New Paltz, New York
- New Philadelphia High School, a public high school in New Philadelphia, Ohio
- New Providence High School, a public high school in New Providence, New Jersey
- Newbury Park High School, a public school in Newbury Park, California
- North Penn High School, a public high school in Towamencin Township, Pennsylvania
- North Point High School, a public high school in Waldorf, Maryland
- North Pole High School, a public high school in North Pole, Alaska
- North Providence High School, a public high school in North Providence, Rhode Island
- North Pitt High School, a public high school near Bethel, North Carolina
