= Grey Stone =

Grey Stone may refer to:

- Grey Stone of Trough in the Forest of Bowland, Lancashire
- The Grey Stone, a scheduled monument and listed building in Harewood, West Yorkshire
- Grey Stone Baptist Church, a church in Durham, North Carolina

== See also ==
- Greystone (disambiguation)
