= Berkshire Fine Spinning Associates =

Former American textile company

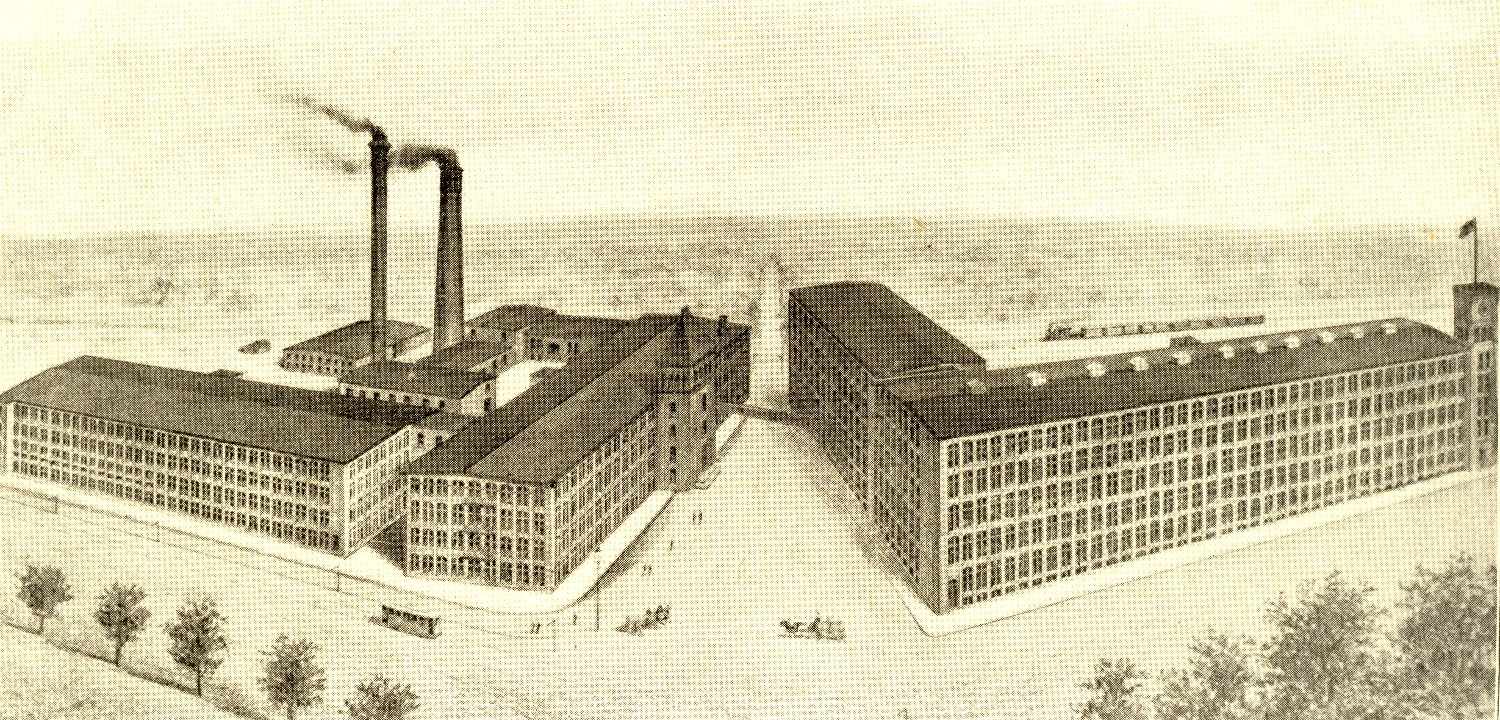
Berkshire Cotton Manufacturing Company, ca.1898

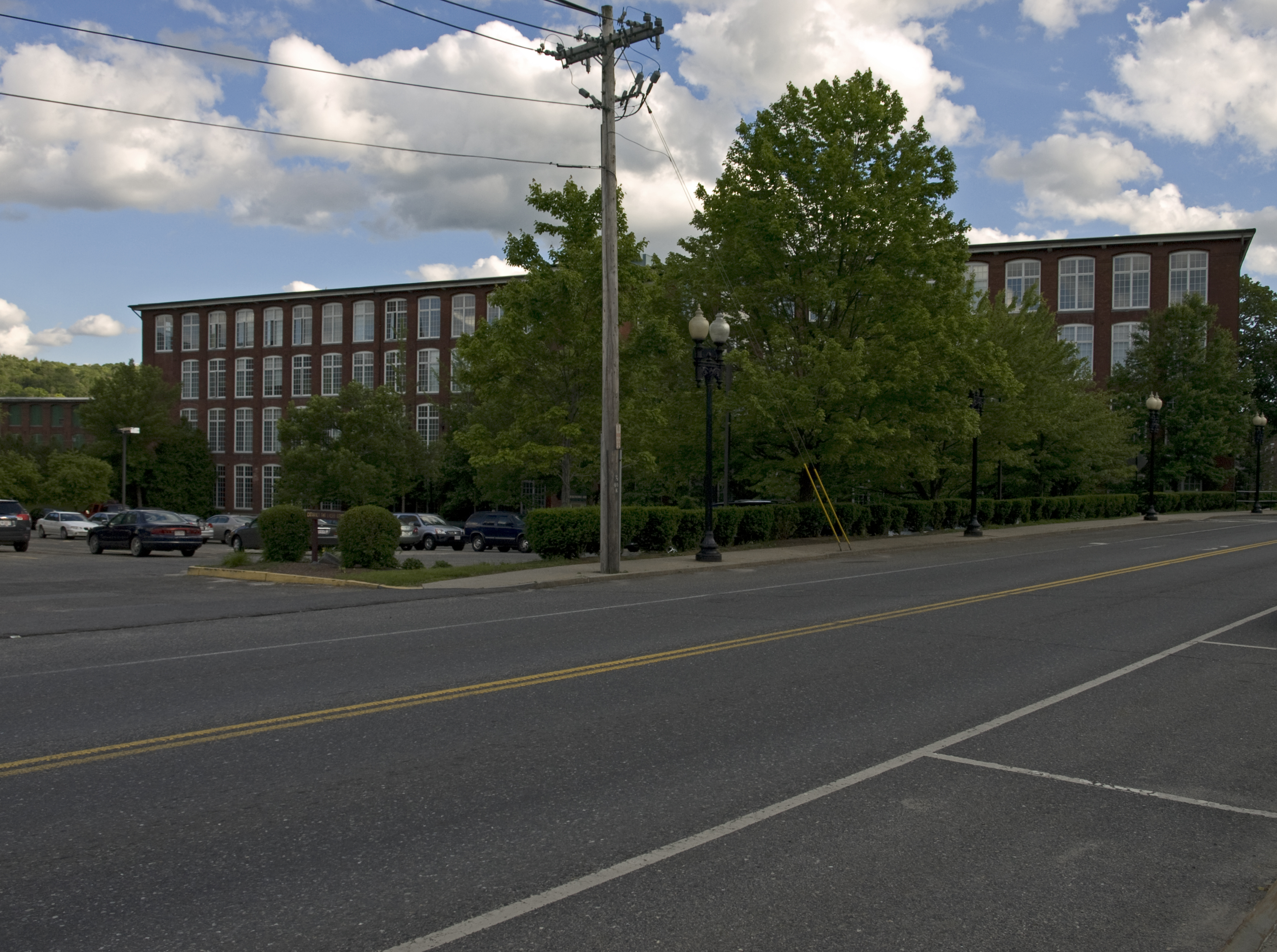
Berkshire Mill No. 1, Adams, now converted to apartments.

Berkshire Fine Spinning Associates (/ˈbɜːrkʃər/) was an American textile company. In 1955, the company merged with Hathaway Manufacturing Company to form Berkshire Hathaway.

== History ==
The company was founded in 1889 as Berkshire Cotton Manufacturing Company by William and Charles Plunkett, the sons of William C. Plunkett, who owned several cotton mills.

The first mill built by the company was Berkshire Mill No. 1 in Adams, Massachusetts, which opened in June 1899. President William McKinley laid a cornerstone for the mill but was forced to cut his visit short by his wife's illness.

In 1929, Berkshire Cotton Manufacturing Company merged with the Valley Falls Company of Rhode Island, founded by Oliver Chace, to form Berkshire Fine Spinning Associates, which was then led by Malcolm Greene Chace.

In 1930, the company acquired King Philip Mills in Fall River, Massachusetts.

In 1931, the company acquired Parker Mills.

Unlike many New England textile companies that failed during the 1920s and 1930s, Berkshire Fine Spinning Associates survived the Great Depression intact.

At its peak in 1948, Berkshire earned $29.5 million and employed 11,000 workers at 11 mills, under the leadership of Malcolm Greene Chace Jr.

In February 1955, Malcolm Jr. organized the merger of Berkshire with Hathaway Manufacturing Company, founded in New Bedford, Massachusetts in 1888 by Horatio Hathaway, to form Berkshire Hathaway. At the same time, failed negotiations with labor unions led to a 13-week strike.

=== Fate of the mills post-merger ===
In 1958, Mill #4 was closed, resulting in the loss of 1,000 jobs.

By the early 1960s, the mills had been sold separately. Declining demand for industrial spaces led to the demolition of Mills #2 and 3

Berkshire Mill No. 1 was converted into 65 apartments in 1987 and is currently managed by Harvest Properties LLC.

In 2014, plans to convert Berkshire Mill No. 4 into 150 affordable apartments were proposed. The development has not started, awaiting permit applications and funding, and the building remains vacant (as of 2023).
