= Greystones (disambiguation) =

Greystones is a town in Wicklow, Ireland

Greystones, or Graystones may also refer to:

- Graystones, a mountain in Cumbria, England, United Kingdom
- Greystones, South Yorkshire, a suburb of Sheffield
- Graystones Forest, the location where William Penn met with members of the Lenape Indian tribe in 1682 to negotiate the first land-purchase survey in Pennsylvania.

== See also ==
- Greystone (disambiguation)
