= Berkshire Mill No. 1 =

- U.S. National Register of Historic Places
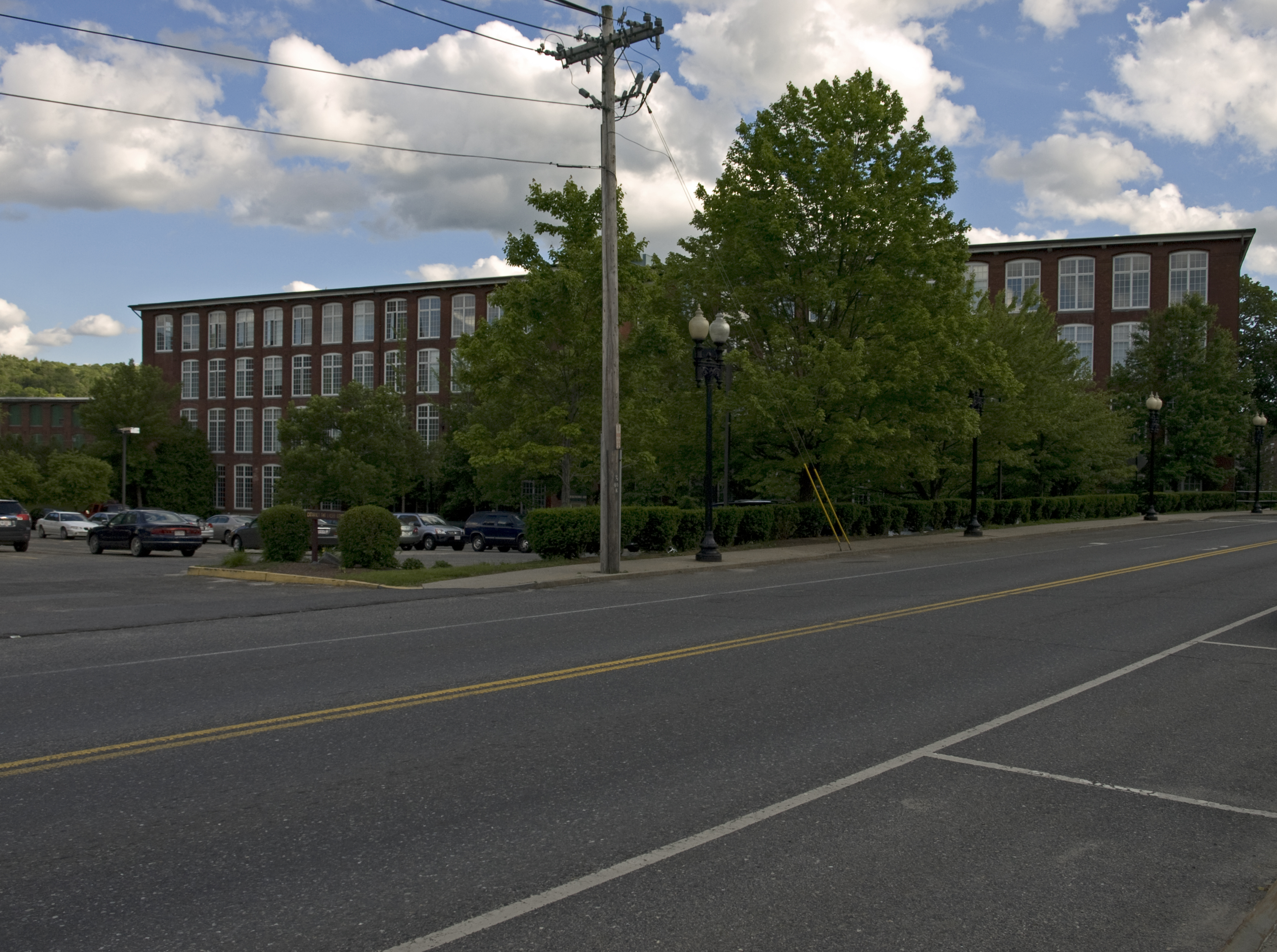
- Berkshire Mill

- Location within Massachusetts Location within the United States
- Location: Hoosac and Columbia Streets, Adams, Massachusetts
- Coordinates: 42°37′31.389″N 73°7′6.2538″W
- Built: 1889
- Architect: Frank P. Sheldon
- NRHP reference No.: 82004946
- Added to NRHP: April 1, 1982

The Berkshire Mill No. 1 is a historic mill complex on Hoosac Street in the center of Adams, Massachusetts. Built in 1895 by the locally prominent Plunkett family, it is an important surviving reminder of the town's industrial textile past. Now converted into mixed residential and commercial use, it was listed on the National Register of Historic Places in 1982.

== Description and history ==
The Berkshire Mill No. 1 stands just north of Adams' central business district, on a parcel bounded by Columbia and Hoosac Streets to the west and south, and a railroad right-of-way to the east. The mill consists of a large main building, 3-1/2 stories in height, built out of red brick with granite foundation and trim. Architectural detailing is limited, with windows set in segmented-arch openings and a cornice with some corbelled brickwork. The most prominent decoration is in the tower that projects from the center of the south-facing main facade, rising four stories to a hip roof. The upper level on three sides consists of a series of round-arch openings.

The mill is one of the surviving remnants of the Berkshire Cotton Manufacturing Company, established in Adams in 1888 by the locally prominent Plunkett family, and one of the town's largest employers at its height. The company eventually merged several times, and is now known as Berkshire Hathaway, a company managed by Warren Buffett. The manufacturing company was originally successful despite a drop in demand for the products of other Adams mills because the Plunketts decided to focus on more fashionable fine cotton fabric. The company grew rapidly between its founding and 1900, when President William McKinley, a friend of the Plunketts, laid the cornerstone for their Number 4 Mill. This mill was built on the site of the former Adams Paper Company mill, in which the Plunketts had been leasing space. Mill No. 2 was located north of this building, where the parking lot is located. The company eventually acquired other mills by purchase, but business declined in the 20th century, and the mills changed ownership several times. Portions of them were converted to other manufacturing uses, and mills 2 and 3 were demolished due do a drop in demand for industrial space. The building was converted into 65 apartments in 1987 and is currently managed by Harvest Properties LLC. A similar proposal to convert Berkshire Mill No.4 into 150 apartments was made in 2014 but development has not started and the building remains vacant.

== See also ==
- National Register of Historic Places listings in Berkshire County, Massachusetts
