= Horatio Hathaway =

American businessman (1831–1898)

Horatio Hathaway (May 19, 1831 – March 25, 1898) was a New England industrialist, politician, and philanthropist and namesake of Berkshire Hathaway.

== Early life ==
Hathaway was born on May 19, 1831, to Nathaniel Hathaway and Anna (Shoemaker) Hathaway in New Bedford. Hathaway attended Phillips Andover Academy, and graduated from Harvard University in 1850. He then travelled to China on a merchant ship, spending two years away from America, participating in the China Trade. In 1859 Hathaway married Ellen Rodman and they had five children.

Hathaway's father, Nathaniel, and Hathaway's uncles, Thomas S. Hathaway and Francis S. Hathaway, operated a tea importing business. After his father's death and his uncle, Francis', death in 1869, and his uncle, Thomas' death in 1878, Horatio inherited a large fortune from the business. Hathaway also served as treasurer of the Potomska Mills for a period.

== Civic, business, and philanthropic activities ==
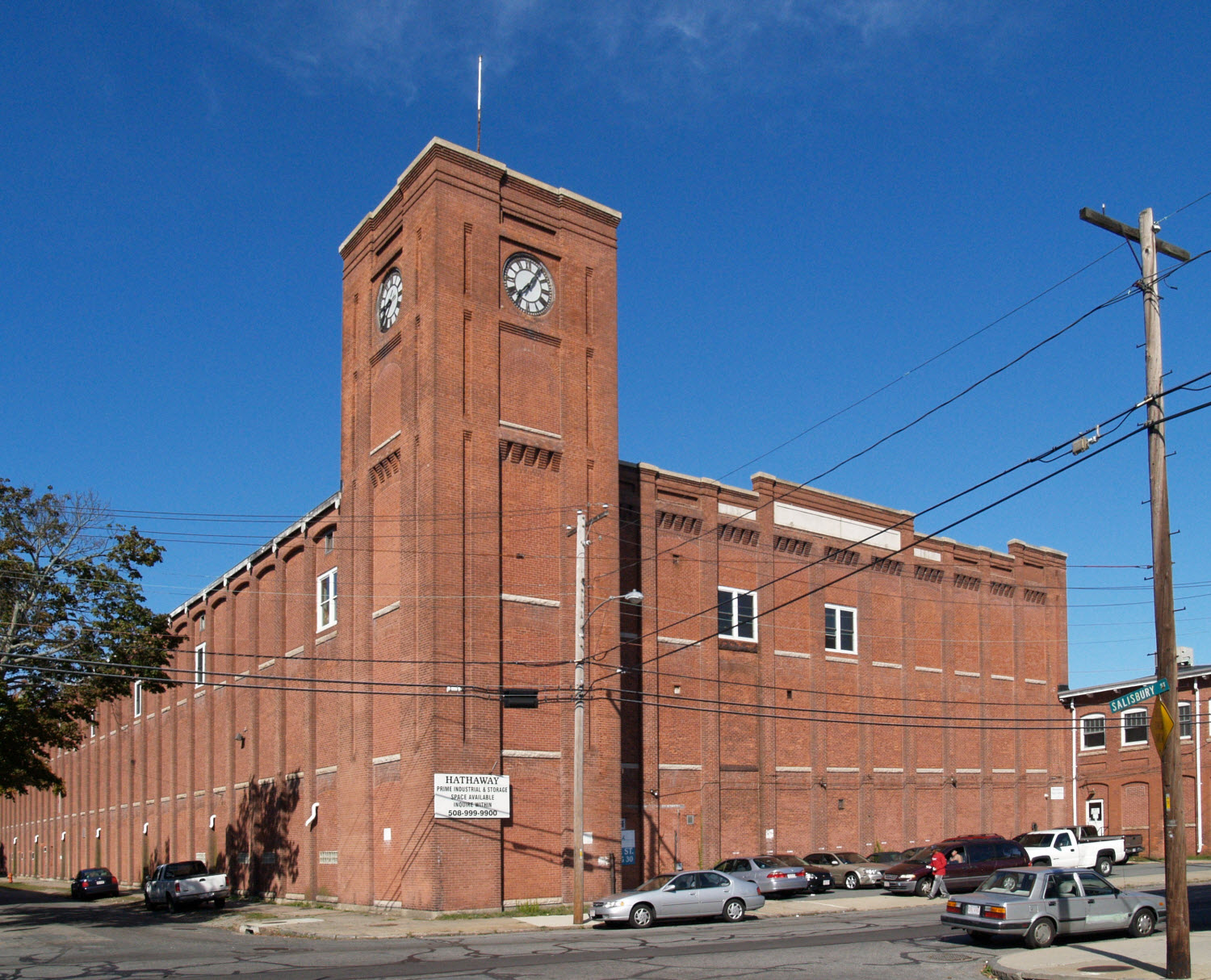
Hathaway Mills

Hathaway was engaged in various civic activities in the city of New Bedford. He was a member of the Whig Party and then the Republican Party He was elected to the city council of New Bedford in 1866 to 1877 and served as president in 1868 and 1869. He lost the mayoral election in 1869. He worked as president of Acushnet Mills and was a director of the Acushnet Mills, Hathaway Manufacturing Corporation, Mechanics' National Bank, the Potomska Mills and Wamsutta Mills and other mills in the New Bedford and Fall River area.

Hathaway was a co-founder of St. Luke's Hospital. He was an active member and member of the vestry at Grace Church in New Bedford, a Protestant Episcopal church, after leaving the Unitarian Church due to its theologically liberal views, and Hathaway made large donations to Grace Church.

== Legacy ==
Hathaway died March 25, 1898. In 1955, under the leadership of Seabury Stanton, Hathaway Manufacturing Company merged with Berkshire Fine Spinning Associates to become Berkshire Hathaway, which Warren Buffett purchased in 1962 and is now one of the largest companies in the world.
