= Cody Wild =

American ice hockey player

- Born: June 5, 1987 (age 38) Limestone, Maine, U.S.
- Height: 6 ft 1 in (185 cm)
- Weight: 205 lb (93 kg; 14 st 9 lb)
- Position: Defense
- Shot: Left
- Played for: Springfield Falcons; Providence Bruins; WBS Penguins; Hamilton Bulldogs; Nottingham Panthers
- NHL draft: 140th overall, 2006; Edmonton Oilers
- Playing career: 2008–2015

Cody Wild (born June 5, 1987) is an American former professional ice hockey defenseman.

== Playing career ==
Wild was born in Limestone, Maine, however, he grew up in North Providence, Rhode Island and attended North Providence High School. Wild was selected in the 5th Round (140th overall) by the Edmonton Oilers in the 2006 NHL entry draft. Wild played college hockey for three years for the Providence College Friars until he left after his junior season to sign with Edmonton Oilers.

On March 2, 2010, the Edmonton Oilers traded Wild to the Boston Bruins for Matt Marquardt.

On August 5, 2013, Wild signed as a free agent to a one-year contract with ECHL club, the Orlando Solar Bears.

On July 2, 2014, Wild signed his first contract abroad in the United Kingdom agreeing to a one-year contract with the Nottingham Panthers of the EIHL.

== Career statistics ==
			Regular season					Playoffs
Season	Team	League	GP	G	A	Pts	PIM	GP	G	A	Pts	PIM
2003–04	Boston Jr. Bruins	EJHL	30	3	18	21	6	—	—	—	—	—
2004–05	Boston Jr. Bruins	EJHL	54	13	36	49	38	—	—	—	—	—
2005–06	Providence College	HE	36	6	15	21	24	—	—	—	—	—
2006–07	Providence College	HE	32	6	8	14	28	—	—	—	—	—
2007–08	Providence College	HE	32	4	18	22	28	—	—	—	—	—
2007–08	Springfield Falcons	AHL	13	1	2	3	8	—	—	—	—	—
2008–09	Springfield Falcons	AHL	59	4	14	18	42	—	—	—	—	—
2008–09	Stockton Thunder	ECHL	6	1	2	3	8	—	—	—	—	—
2009–10	Springfield Falcons	AHL	37	0	14	14	24	—	—	—	—	—
2009–10	Stockton Thunder	ECHL	4	0	1	1	4	—	—	—	—	—
2009–10	Providence Bruins	AHL	18	0	3	3	10	—	—	—	—	—
2010–11	Providence Bruins	AHL	7	0	1	1	2	—	—	—	—	—
2010–11	Reading Royals	ECHL	25	1	10	11	4	—	—	—	—	—
2011–12	Wilkes–Barre/Scranton Penguins	AHL	51	1	5	6	34	2	1	0	1	0
2011–12	Wheeling Nailers	ECHL	1	0	0	0	0	—	—	—	—	—
2012–13	Wheeling Nailers	ECHL	35	6	20	26	14	—	—	—	—	—
2012–13	Hamilton Bulldogs	AHL	2	0	0	0	0	—	—	—	—	—
2012–13	Wilkes–Barre/Scranton Penguins	AHL	14	0	2	2	10	2	0	1	1	0
2013–14	Orlando Solar Bears	ECHL	52	4	26	30	26	6	1	2	3	2
2014–15	Nottingham Panthers	EIHL	38	7	26	33	6	—	—	—	—	—
AHL totals			201	6	41	47	130	4	1	1	2	0
ECHL totals			123	12	59	71	56	6	1	2	3	2

== Awards and honors ==
Award	Year
All-Hockey East Rookie Team	2005–06
