= Hathaway Mills =

American textile company, predecessor of Berkshire Hathaway

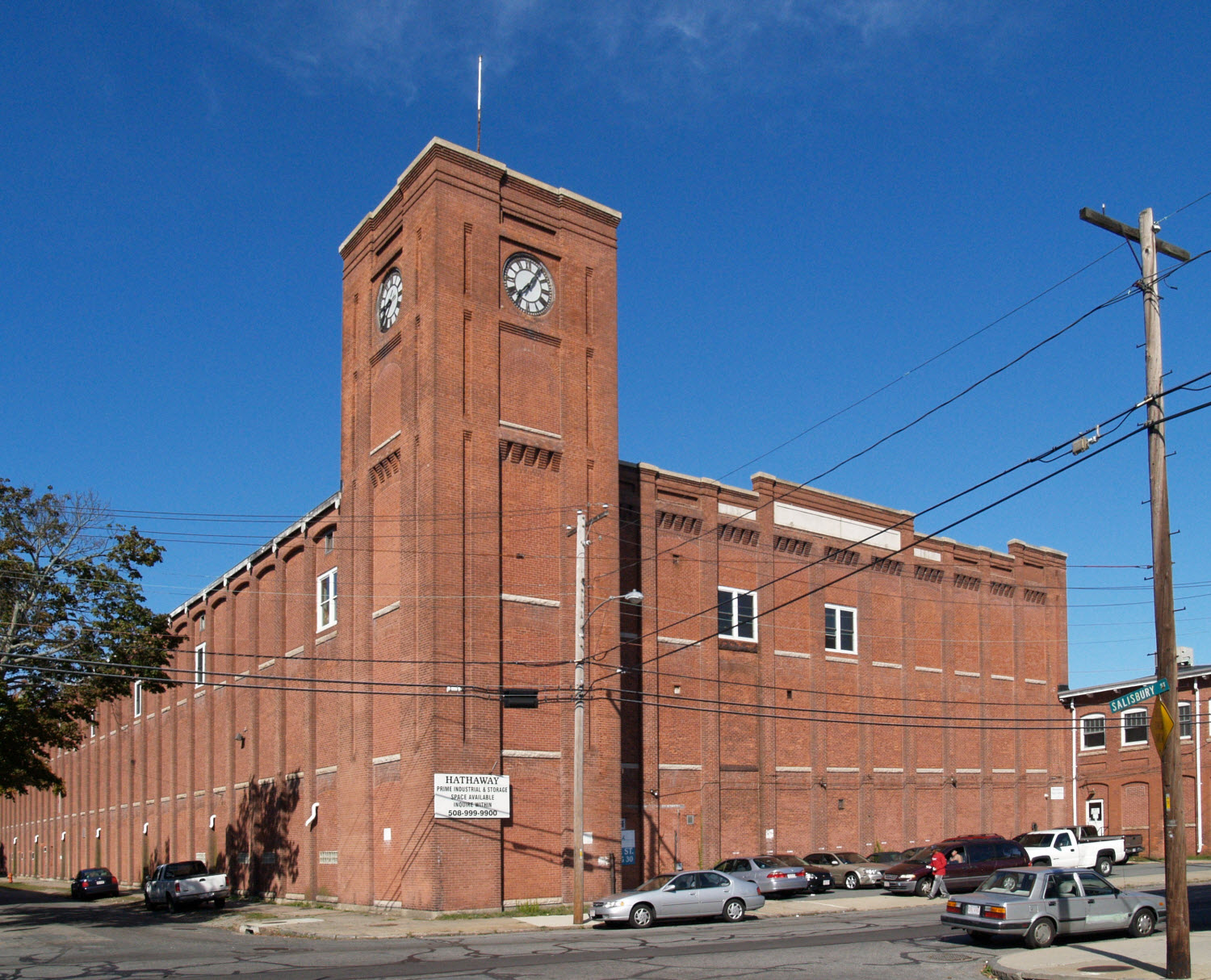
Hathaway Mills, New Bedford, Massachusetts. This mill was originally built by Dartmouth Mfg. Co.

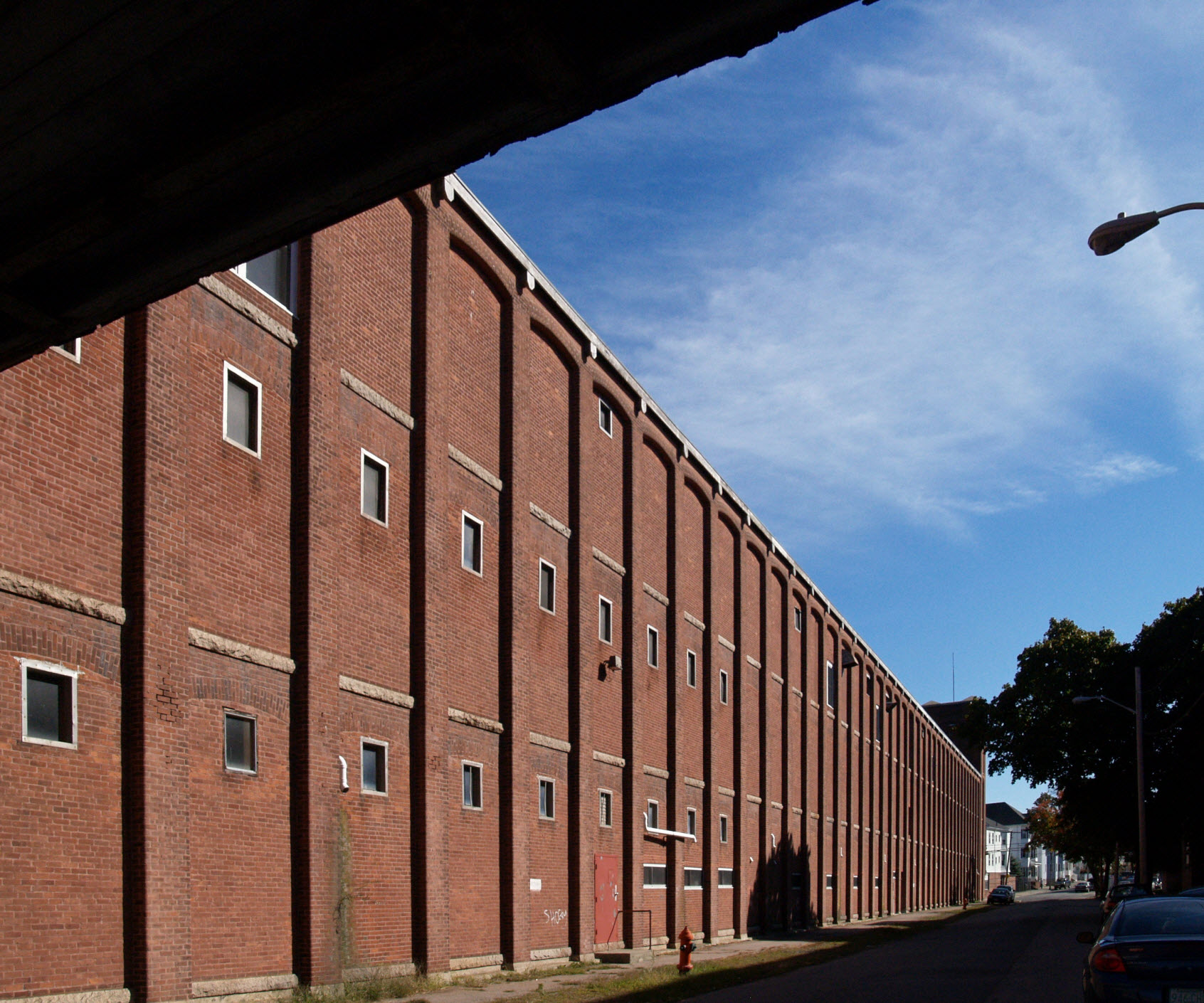
Hathaway Mills, Harbor Street side

The Hathaway Manufacturing Company was a producer of cotton textiles. In 1955, the company merged with Berkshire Fine Spinning Associates to form Berkshire Hathaway.

== History ==
The company was founded in New Bedford, Massachusetts in 1888 by Horatio Hathaway, a China trader and whaler in the Pacific.

Hathaway became the largest manufacturer of rayon suits.

In 1955, the company merged with Berkshire Fine Spinning Associates of Adams, Massachusetts to form Berkshire Hathaway.

In 1985, Berkshire Hathaway shut the last textile operations. A mill, sold in 1985 for $215,000, was torn down in January 2014 after failing to find a buyer.

== See also ==
- Wamsutta Mills
- List of mills in New Bedford, Massachusetts
