= Ernie DiGregorio =

American basketball player (born 1951)

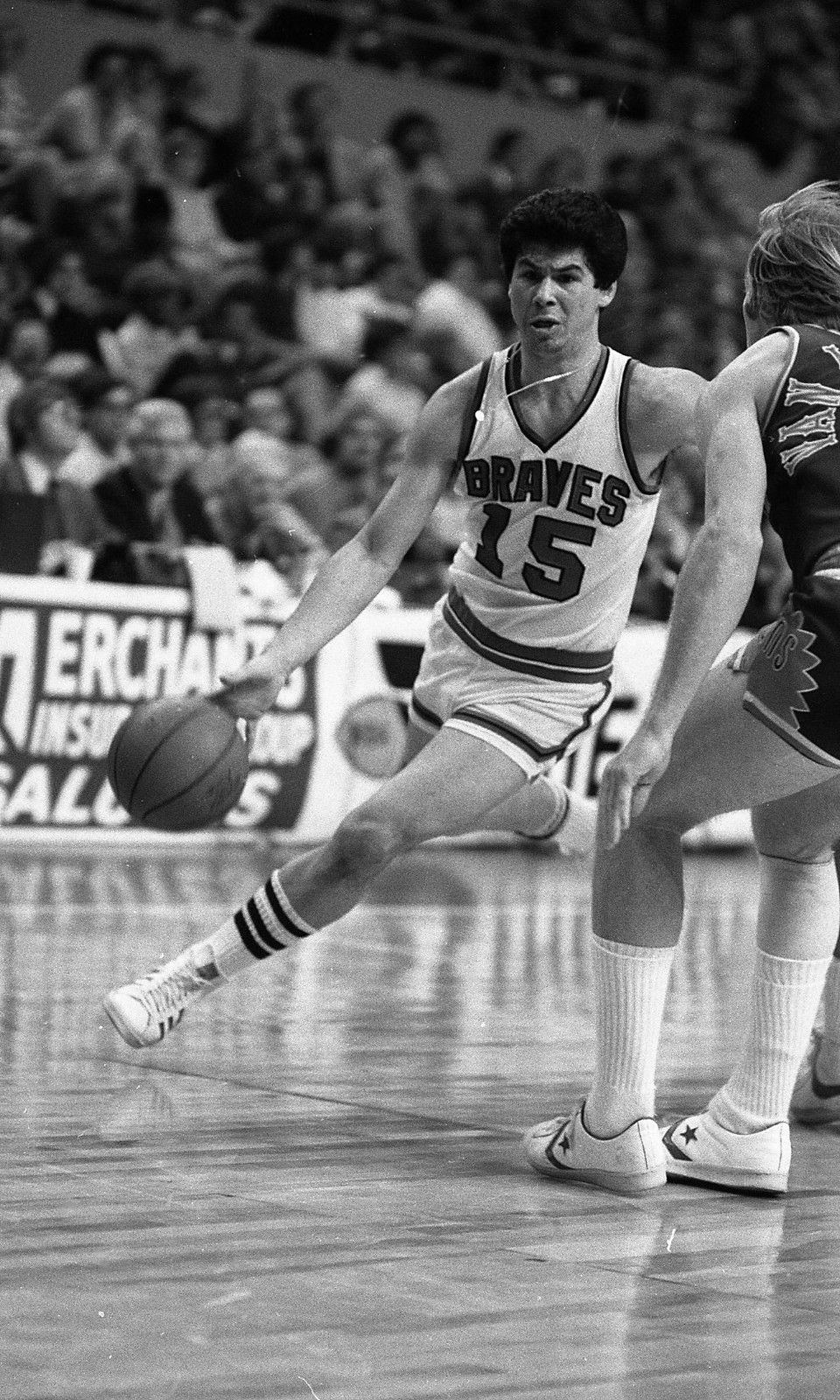
- DiGregorio playing for the Buffalo Braves

Personal information
- Born: January 15, 1951 (age 75) North Providence, Rhode Island, U.S.
- Listed height: 6 ft 0 in (1.83 m)
- Listed weight: 180 lb (82 kg)

Career information
- High school: North Providence (North Providence, Rhode Island)
- College: Providence (1970–1973)
- NBA draft: 1973: 1st round, 3rd overall pick
- Drafted by: Buffalo Braves
- Playing career: 1973–1978
- Position: Point guard
- Number: 15, 7

Career history
- 1973–1977: Buffalo Braves
- 1977–1978: Los Angeles Lakers
- 1978: Boston Celtics

Career highlights
- NBA Rookie of the Year (1974); NBA All-Rookie First Team (1974); NBA assists leader (1974); Consensus first-team All-American (1973)

Career NBA statistics
- Points: 2,997 (9.6 ppg)
- Rebounds: 610 (2.0 rpg)
- Assists: 1,594 (5.1 apg)
- Stats at NBA.com
- Stats at Basketball Reference
- Collegiate Basketball Hall of Fame

Ernest DiGregorio (born January 15, 1951), also known as "Ernie D.", is an American former professional basketball player. He played in the National Basketball Association (NBA) for the Buffalo Braves, Los Angeles Lakers, and Boston Celtics from 1973 to 1978.

DiGregorio was named NBA Rookie of the Year in the 1973–74 season and shares the NBA rookie record for assists in a single game with 25. Due to a severe knee injury suffered early in DiGregorio's professional career, he played only five NBA seasons.

A 1973 NCAA All-American at Providence, DiGregorio was inducted into the College Basketball Hall of Fame in 2019.

== Early life ==
DiGregorio was born on January 15, 1951, in North Providence, Rhode Island. At age 12, he decided to become a professional basketball player, and put in thousands of hours over the years to develop his skills. He played on the 1968 Rhode Island (Class B) champions at North Providence High School. He averaged 26 points per game as a freshman and 37 as a senior.

== College and NBA career ==
=== Providence College ===
DiGregorio attended Providence College, graduating in 1973. He played basketball under Hall of Fame head coach Dave Gavitt. DiGregorio, Marvin Barnes and Kevin Stacom led the Providence team to a Final Four appearance in the 1973 National Collegiate Athletic Conference (NCAA) Tournament in DiGregorio's senior season. They eventually lost to Memphis State, but only after Barnes sustained a knee injury that forced an early exit, after playing only 11 minutes in the game. DiGregorio received the NCAA East Regional Most Outstanding Player honors.

In the 1972-73 season, DiGregorio averaged 24.5 points per game and 8.6 assists per game (a school record as of 2024), and was Eastern College Athletic Conference (ECAC) Player of the Year. He received the 1973 Lapchick Award as the nation’s outstanding senior. He was an All-American for each of his three varsity years at Providence, and a first-team consensus All-American his senior year. Over his three-year career, he averaged 20.5 points a game, and a school record 7.7 assists per game (as of 2024).

Providence retired his number at halftime of a February 5, 2008 game against DePaul, giving the fans DiGregorio bobblehead figures.

=== International exhibition series ===
After playing for the Providence, DiGregorio played on a college All-Star team, coached by Bob Cousy, against a team from the Soviet Union in a six-game exhibition series. DiGregorio was considered the star of the series. Among others, the U.S. team also included future Hall of Fame center Bill Walton, Swen Nater (who replaced Walton after an injury in game 1), Providence teammate Marvin Barnes, future Hall of Fame player Bobby Jones, Pat McFarland, and Tom Henderson, who defeated the Soviet team in the bruising six-game exhibition series, which helped heal the still-open wound of the United States' loss in the 1972 Summer Olympic finals.

The Soviet team included, among others, Aleksander Belov. The American team won the first game 83–65, with DiGregorio and Nater the leading scorers (14 points each), and DiGregorio making crowd pleasing sharp passes. In the fifth game, DiGregorio scored two baskets in 13 seconds to send the game into overtime, which the U.S. won 89–80. DiGregorio had 25 points and 11 assists, and Barnes scored 8 points in overtime.

=== Buffalo Braves (1973–1977) ===
DiGregorio was drafted by the Kentucky Colonels of the American Basketball Association in the ABA's 1973 special circumstances draft but opted instead for the NBA.

He was selected third overall by the Buffalo Braves (a franchise now known as the Los Angeles Clippers) in the 1973 NBA draft, out of Providence College. DiGregorio won the NBA Rookie of the Year Award in 1973–74 after averaging 15.2 points, and leading the league in both free throw percentage (.902) and assists per game (8.2), while playing 35.9 minutes per game. DiGregorio still holds the NBA rookie record for assists in a single game with 25 (a record now shared with Nate McMillan). The following year, he had a severe knee injury that cut short his future productivity and remaining career.

He would never again come close to his 1973-74 level of production. He played only 31 games of the 1974-75 season, and 67 games the next year, playing only 20 minutes a game and averaging less than seven points a game. His coach Jack Ramsay thought DiGregorio had lost speed and quickness after knee surgery, and made him the team's fourth guard; though DiGregorio disagreed with that assessment. During DiGregorio's last full season with the Braves (1976–77), he was up to 28 minutes a game, and averaged 10.7 points and 4.7 assists per game. He led the league in free throw percentage a second time, with a then-NBA record 94.5%. As of 2026, this is the 9th best seasonal percentage of all-time.

In 1977, he joined fellow NBA stars Julius Erving, Rick Barry, Wilt Chamberlain, and Pete Maravich, in endorsing Spalding's line of rubber basketballs, with a signature "Ernie D." ball making up part of the collection.

=== Los Angeles Lakers (1977–1978) ===
Before the 1977–78 season, the Braves sold DiGregorio's contract rights to the Los Angeles Lakers, after Buffalo had acquired future Hall of Fame point guard Nate "Tiny" Archibald; part of a greater plan of player transactions in Buffalo. DiGregorio played in a Lakers' uniform, under coach Jerry West (who had been hopeful about DiGregorio as his point guard), in only 25 games before being waived.

=== Boston Celtics (1978) ===
The Boston Celtics signed him as a free agent but he played only sparingly for the rest of the season. He would not play in the NBA again, although he did not formally retire until 1981.

== Honors ==
- In 1999, DiGregorio was elected to the National Italian American Sports Hall of Fame.
- In 2001, DiGregorio was inducted into the Rhode Island Heritage Hall of Fame.
- In 2016, he was inducted into the Eastern College Athletic Conference Hall of Fame.
- In 2019, DiGregorio was inducted into the College Basketball Hall of Fame.
- In 2024, The Ernie DiGregorio Sports Complex was dedicated by North Providence at the Millar-Waite-Evans Memorial Park.

== Post-NBA ==
After 1978, he returned to Providence College to earn a degree. In 1981, at only 30 years old, Celtic coach Bill Fitch gave DiGregorio an opportunity to try out for the Celtics. DiGregorio tried to make a comeback with the Nets in 1983. He was a head coach for the Rhode Island School for the Deaf. He later became the head coach at his high school alma mater, North Providence High. He was also a referee in the Continental Basketball Association for a year, and worked with an advertising firm in public relations. He later took a job at Foxwoods Casino in Connecticut. He has written children's books, worked in the community holding basketball clinics and advised young basketball players at local schools. He worked as Director of Operations for the Buffalo 716ers of the American Basketball Association.

== Career statistics ==
Legend
GP	Games played	GS	Games started	MPG	Minutes per game
FG%	Field goal percentage	3P%	3-point field goal percentage	FT%	Free throw percentage
RPG	Rebounds per game	APG	Assists per game	SPG	Steals per game
BPG	Blocks per game	PPG	Points per game	**Bold**	Career high

=== NBA ===
==== Regular season ====
Year	Team	GP	GS	MPG	FG%	3P%	FT%	RPG	APG	SPG	BPG	PPG
1973–74	Buffalo	**81**	—	**35.9**	.421	—	.902*	**2.7**	**8.2***	**0.7**	**0.1**	**15.2**
1974–75	Buffalo	31	—	23.0	**.440**	—	.778	1.5	4.9	0.6	0.0	7.8
1975–76	Buffalo	67	—	20.4	.384	—	.915	1.7	4.0	0.6	0.0	6.7
1976–77	Buffalo	**81**	—	28.0	.417	—	.**945***	2.3	4.7	0.7	0.0	10.7
1977–78	L.A. Lakers	25	—	13.3	.410	—	.800	0.9	2.8	0.2	0.0	3.9
1977–78	Boston	27	—	10.1	.431	—	.923	1.0	2.4	0.4	0.0	3.9
Career		312	—	25.2	.415	—	.902	2.0	5.1	0.6	0.0	9.6

==== Playoffs ====
Year	Team	GP	GS	MPG	FG%	3P%	FT%	RPG	APG	SPG	BPG	PPG
1974	Buffalo	6	—	**40.0**	.430	—	.889	**2.7**	**8.7**	0.2	0.0	**13.7**
1976	Buffalo	**9**	—	24.1	**.484**	—	**1.000**	1.4	5.0	**0.6**	**0.2**	7.6
Career		15	—	30.5	.453	—	.941	1.9	6.5	0.4	0.1	10.0

=== College ===
Year	Team	GP	GS	MPG	FG%	3P%	FT%	RPG	APG	SPG	BPG	PPG
1970–71	Providence	28	—	36.2	**.481**	—	**.830**	**4.0**	6.5	—	—	18.6
1971–72	Providence	27	—	**38.0**	.436	—	.802	3.0	7.9	—	—	17.7
1972–73	Providence	**31**	—	36.0	.478	—	.802	3.2	**8.6**	—	—	**24.5**
Career		86	—	36.7	.468	—	.812	3.4	7.7	—	—	20.5

== See also ==
- List of National Basketball Association players with most assists in a game
