= Fitchburg Yarn Mill =

- U.S. National Register of Historic Places
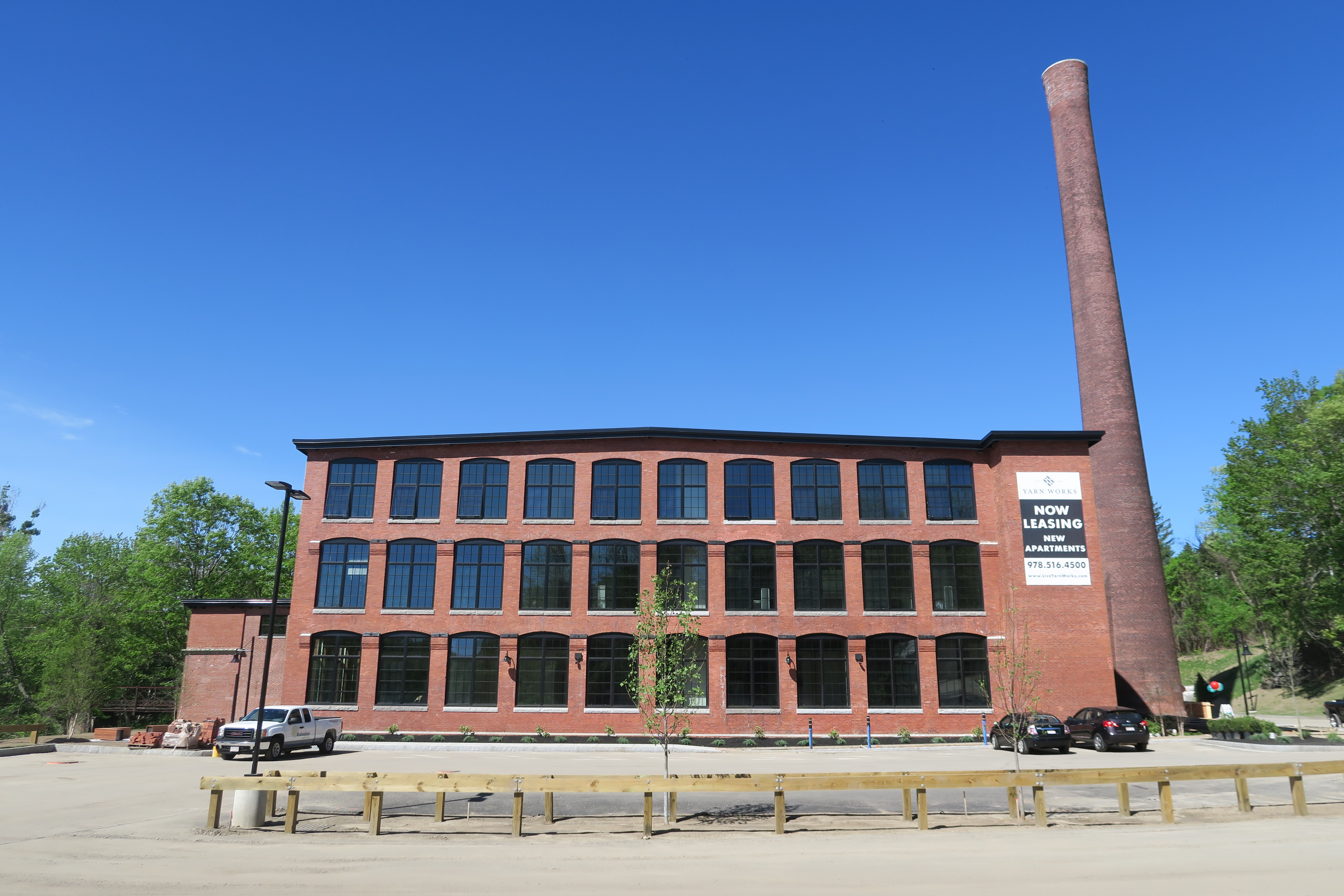
- Fitchburg Yarn Mill

- Location within Massachusetts Location within the United States
- Location: 1428 Main St., Fitchburg, Massachusetts
- Coordinates: 42°35′15″N 71°48′48″W
- Built: 1907
- Architect: Frank P. Sheldon
- NRHP reference No.: 16000817
- Added to NRHP: December 6, 2016

The Fitchburg Yarn Mill is an historic mill building at 1428 Main Street in Fitchburg, Massachusetts. Built in 1907 and enlarged several times, it was one of the city's largest textile operations for over 60 years. The building is an important local work of Frank P. Sheldon, a noted industrial architect of the period. The building was listed on the National Register of Historic Places in 2016.

== Description and history ==
The former Fitchburg Yarn Mill is located on the between Main Street and the north bank of the Nashua River northwest of downtown Fitchburg. The main building is, at 500 feet (150 m) in length and 110 feet (34 m) in width, one of the city's largest industrial buildings. It is three stories in height and built out of red brick. Windows are set in segmented-arch openings with concrete sills, the bays articulated by simple brick pilasters. Attached to the main mill are a two-story office building, an engine house, and a round brick chimney.

The Fitchburg Yarn Company was incorporated in 1906, and this plant was built and operations begun the following year. The building reached its present dimensions in 1919, with the construction of the easternmost section. The building was designed by Frank Sheldon, an industrial architect based in Providence, Rhode Island; his firm provided industrial architectural services across the eastern United States, and is credited with a number of significant surviving mills. The company's leadership were all prominent local businessmen; members of Lyman family were involved in the management of the company for most of its operational existence. The mill was closed about 1970 and the building subsequently redeveloped for multi-family residential use.

== See also ==
- National Register of Historic Places listings in Worcester County, Massachusetts
