= Cornell Mills =

- U.S. National Register of Historic Places
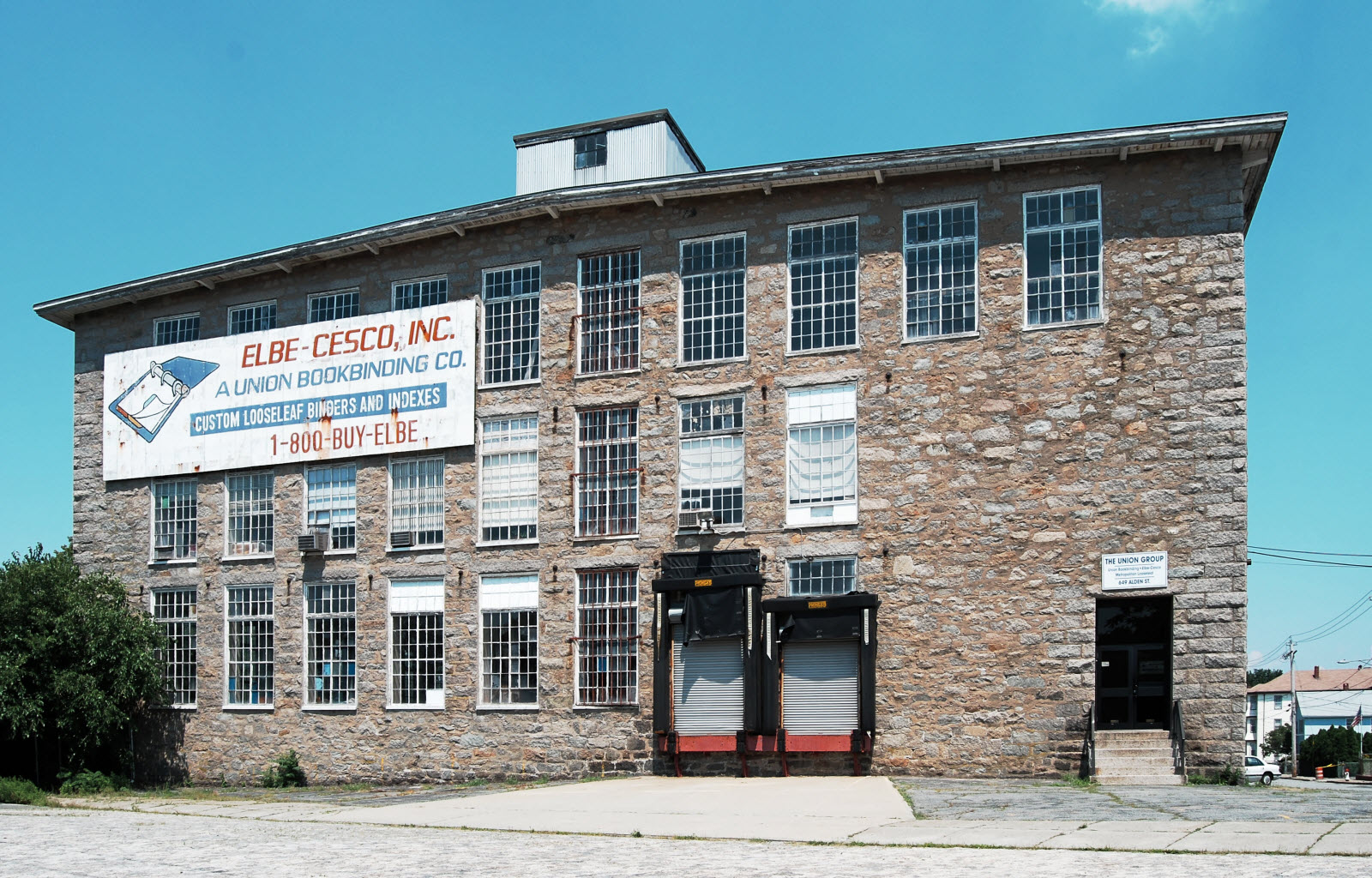

- Location within Massachusetts Location within the United States
- Location: Alden St., Fall River, Massachusetts
- Coordinates: 41°41′3″N 71°8′1″W
- Built: 1890
- Architect: Frank P. Sheldon
- MPS: Fall River MRA
- NRHP reference No.: 83000657
- Added to NRHP: February 16, 1983

Cornell Mills is an historic cotton textile mill on Alden Street in Fall River, Massachusetts. Built in 1890, it is a well-preserved example of late 19th-century industrial mill architecture in stone. The mill complex was added to the National Register of Historic Places in 1983. On February 26, 2016, a developer has bought the property with the intent to convert the mill into middle-class residential housing.

== Description and history ==
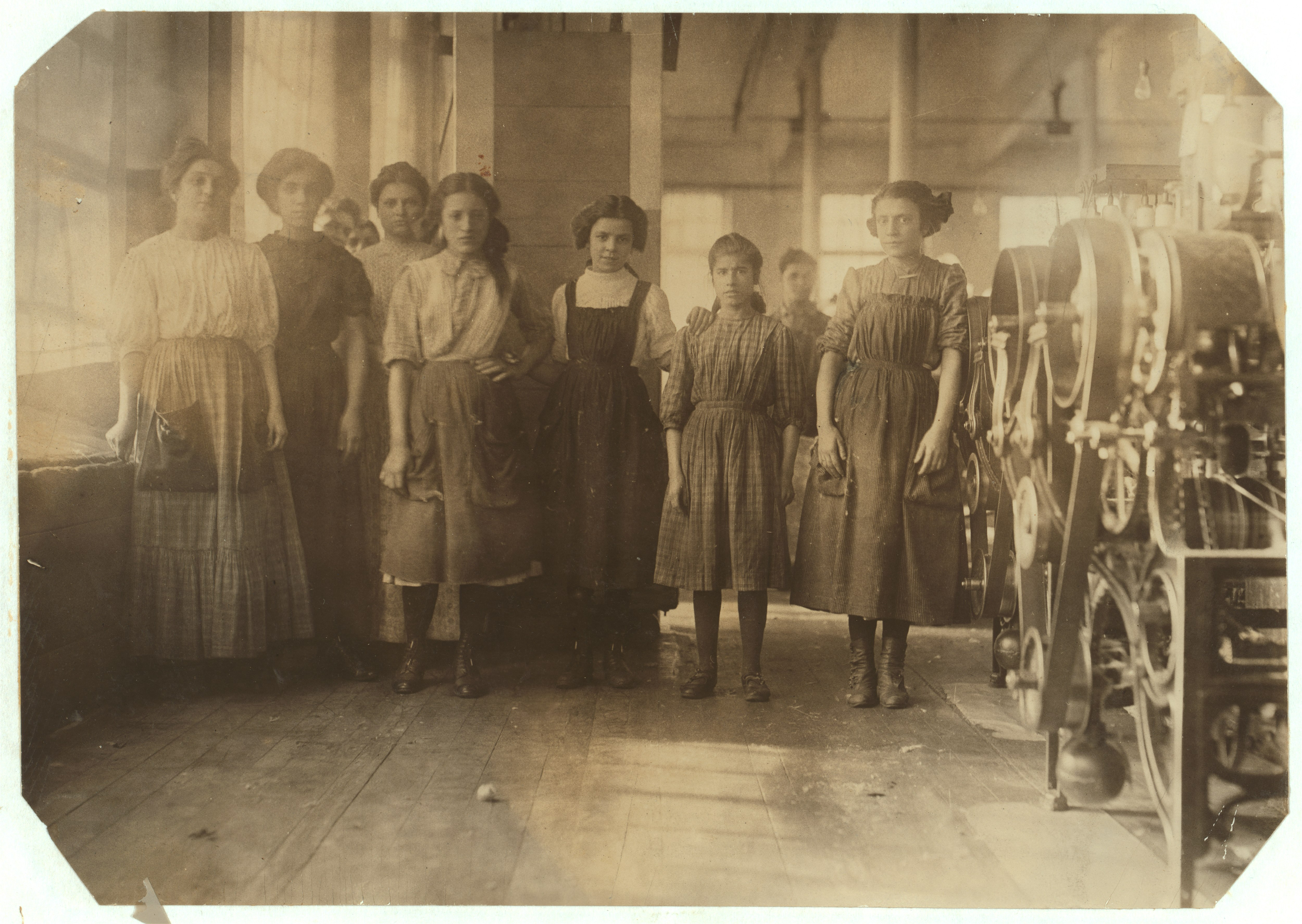
Young girls working at Cornell Mills in 1912

The Cornell Mills building stands in eastern Fall River, and is sandwiched between Alden Street to the east and the western interchange of Massachusetts Route 24 and Interstate 195 to the southwest, from which it is a prominent landmark. The main mill building is a three-story granite structure, fashioned out of rough-cut blocks with dressed corner quoining blocks, lintels, and sills. The window bays are regular in size, but are relieved architecturally by buttresses that group them into threes and sixes. It has a low-pitch gable roof with a wide cornice. The property's ancillary buildings include an engine house, garage, waste house, and storehouse. A freestanding brick chimney rises 160 feet (49 m), with corbelled brickwork at the top.

The mill was organized in 1889 and built in 1890 from native Fall River granite. It had a capacity of 45,000 spindles at its peak in the 1910s, and produced printed cloth and other textiles. John D. Flint was the company's first president. The plant was closed in 1930. The mill was designed by Frank P. Sheldon, a mill engineer from Providence.

The structure was eventually leased out to the Elbe-Cesco bookbinding company in 1939 which continued to occupy parts of the mill until the property was sold to Starr Development Partners in 2016, where it will be converted into 101 middle-class residential rental units similar to what other historic mills have been converted into across the region.

== See also ==
- National Register of Historic Places listings in Fall River, Massachusetts
- List of mills in Fall River, Massachusetts
