= North Providence High School =

Public high school in Rhode Island, US

Coordinates: 41.860550°N 71.459563°W

- 1828 Mineral Spring Avenue; North Providence, Rhode Island 02904; United States

Information
- Motto: Summo Collis
- Established: September 11, 1939
- School district: North Providence Public Schools
- Principal: Christen A. Magill
- Faculty: 116
- Grades: 9–12
- Enrollment: 1,098 (2023–2024)
- Colors: Blue and Gold
- Mascot: Cougar
- Website: nphs.nprovschools.org

North Providence High School (often abbreviated NPH or NPHS) is a public high school in North Providence, Rhode Island, United States that serves grades 9-12. It is part of the North Providence School District and its sports teams compete in the Rhode Island Interscholastic League. North Providence, whose school colors are blue and gold, is home to the Cougars. The high school graduated its first class in 1940. In 1992, part of the school burned down while school was still in session. Trailers were placed in the parking lot and used as classrooms while a new wing was built. The school grounds include a football and baseball field. Within the building there are three gymnasiums, a fitness and training room, and a wood shop. The school was formerly equipped with tunnel access to the town’s Natatorium Complex at the Salvatore Mancini. North Providence High employs 116 faculty and staff for the student body of approximately 1,300 students. North Providence High School holds the distinction of having the highest graduation rate in the state of Rhode Island with 98% of seniors graduating in 2016.

== Athletics ==
Although most of North Providence’s sports teams complete in either Division II or III, many athletes compete at the state level. The sports offered at North Providence High School include:

- Football (D IV)
- Boys’ and Girls’ Soccer
- Boys’ and Girls’ Cross Country
- Boys’ and Girls’ Tennis
- Dance Team
- Cheerleading
- Boys’ and Girls’ Basketball
- Boys’ and Girls’ Swimming
- Ice Hockey
- Wrestling (D I)
- Boys' and Girls’ Lacrosse
- Golf
- Boys’ and Girls’ Outdoor Track
- Baseball
- Fast Pitch Softball (D I)
- Boys' and Girls' Volleyball
- Unified Basketball

== Extracurricular ==
- Technology Student Association (TSA)
- National Honor Society
- Academic Decathlon
- Drama Club
- International Club
- Italian Club
- Math Club
- Future Business Leaders of America (FBLA)
- Student Government Day
- Yearbook
- Student Council
- Mock Trial
- Model Legislature
- Broadcasters’ Club
- Newspaper (Cougar Courier)
- Science Olympiad
- Concert Band
- A Capella
- Marching Band
- Youth Commission
- SADD-Students Against Drunk Driving
- Jazz Band
- Concert Choir
- Gay Straight Alliance
- Angel Network
- Nerd Herd
- Cougar pause project
- E-Sports Team

== Student Council ==
Student Council is made up of six students filling six positions, President, Vice President, Secretary, Treasurer, and Social Committee Girl and Boy. All grade levels have a Student Council committee that works cooperatively with a Class Advisor to plan class events. These events include the ordering of class rings, Junior Prom, and during Senior Year, Spirit Week, Spirit Night, Homecoming, Winter Ball, Senior Prom, Senior Class Trip, and Senior Night.

== Notable alumni ==
- Ernie DiGregorio, former NBA player
- Eric Ebron, NFL player
- Stefano Famiglietti, member of the Rhode Island Senate
- Cody Wild, professional hockey player
