= Paramount Knitting Company Mill =

- U.S. National Register of Historic Places
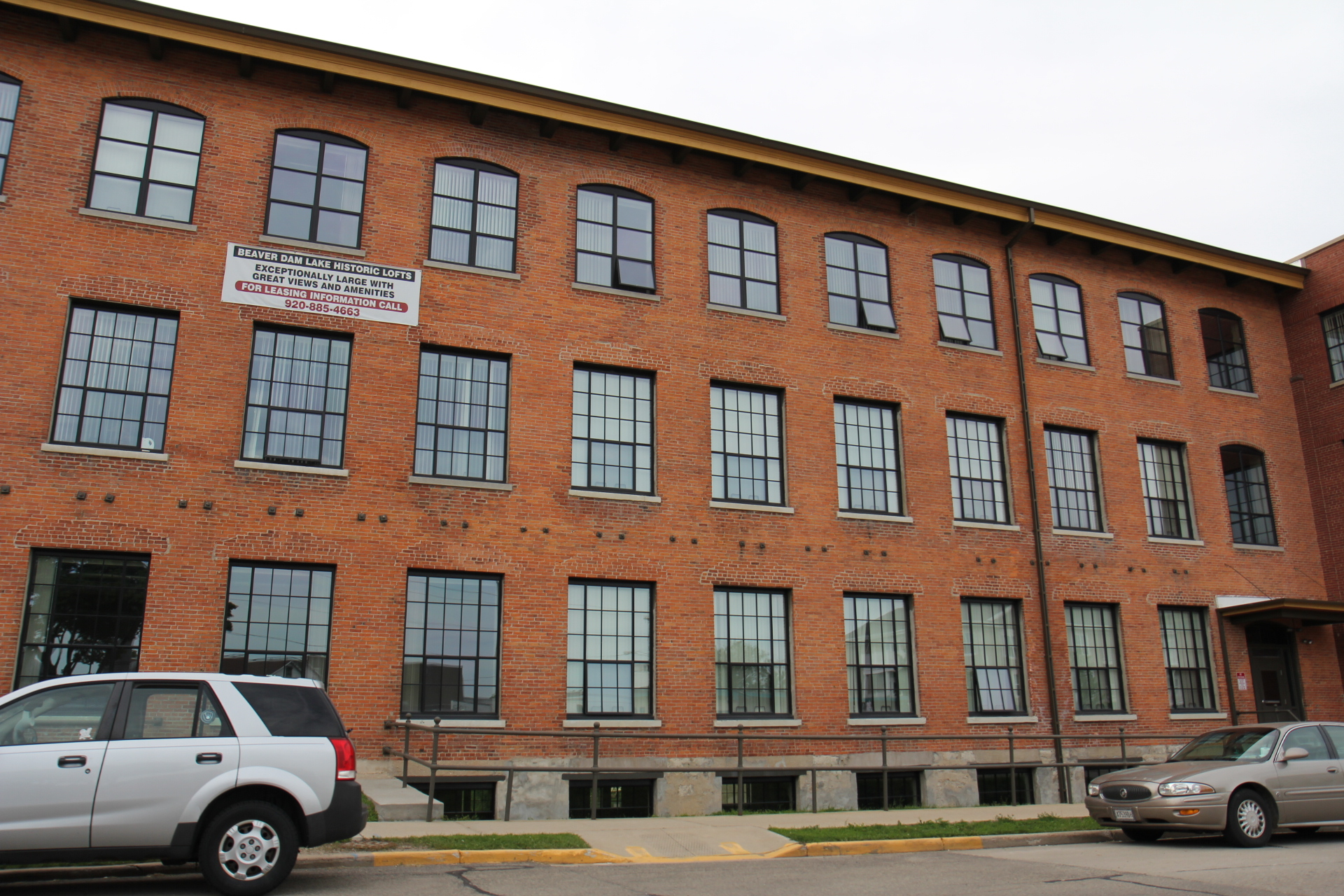
- Paramount Knitting Company Mill

- Location within Wisconsin
- Location: 222 Madison St. Beaver Dam, Wisconsin
- Coordinates: 43.454330°N 88.842095°W
- Built: 1883
- Architect: C. P. Hubbard; Frank P. Sheldon
- Architectural style: Late 19th and Early 20th Century American Movements
- NRHP reference No.: 10001229
- Added to NRHP: February 4, 2011

The Paramount Knitting Company Mill is located in Beaver Dam, Wisconsin.

== History ==
Receiving its power from the Beaver Dam River, the mill was used for cotton knitting until 1906, when it began knitting hosiery. It was later converted in to a plant for a shoe company.

It was added to the State Register of Historic Places in 2010 and to the National Register of Historic Places the following year. The textile mile was converted to knit hosiery, until 1934.
