= Lakeside Development =

- U.S. National Register of Historic Places
- U.S. Historic district
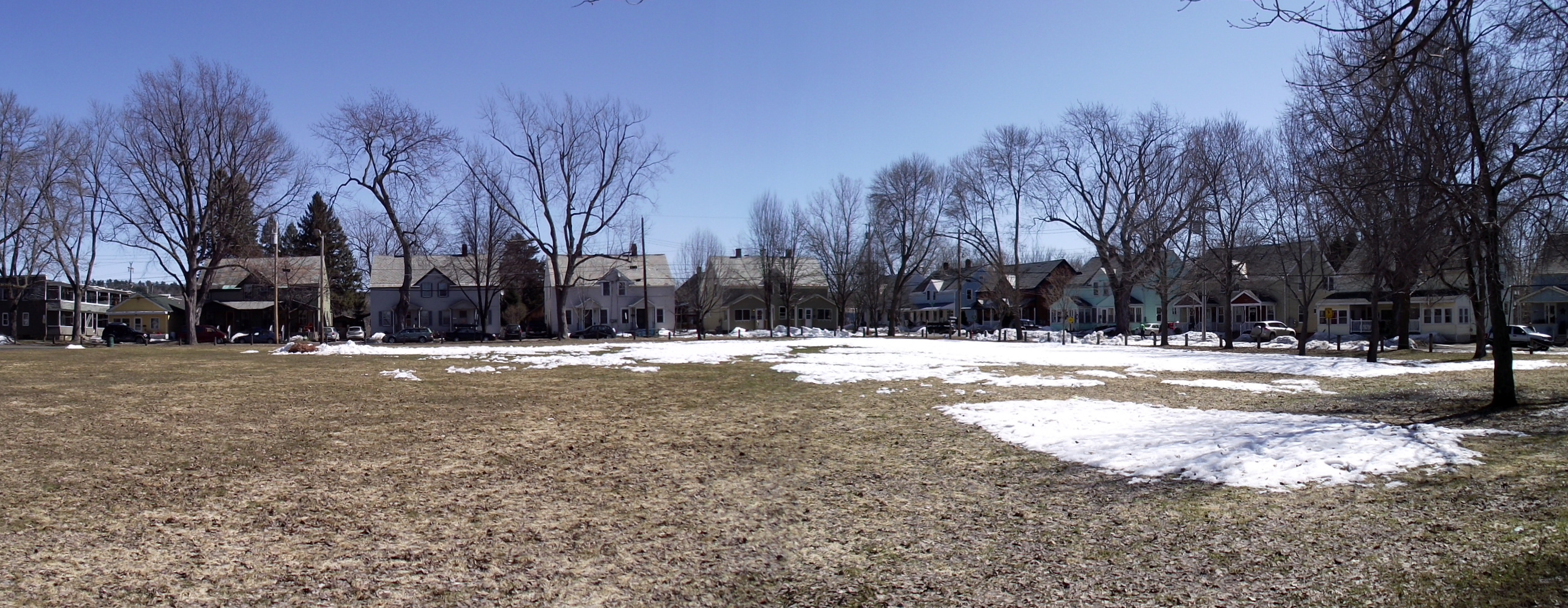

- Location within Vermont Location within the United States
- Location: Lakeside, Central, Conger, Wright, and Harrison Aves., Burlington, Vermont
- Coordinates: 44°27′35″N 73°13′15″W
- Area: 17 acres (6.9 ha)
- Built: 1894
- Built by: Queen City Cotton Company
- Architectural style: Colonial Revival, Queen Anne
- NRHP reference No.: 82001699
- Added to NRHP: April 12, 1982

The Lakeside Development, or the Lakeside Historic District, encompasses a historic company-built residential development in southern Burlington, Vermont. Isolated between the Vermont Railway railroad line and Lake Champlain and accessible only via Lakeside Avenue off Pine Street, the area was developed between about 1894 and 1910 by the Queen City Cotton Company, whose mill complex stood just to the east of the railroad line. The district was listed on the National Register of Historic Places in 1982.

== Description and history ==
The Lakeside Development occupies about 17 acres (6.9 ha) of lakefront area on the eastern shore of Lake Champlain. It is a residential subdivision, formed into small grid by Lakeside, Wright, Conger, Central, and Harrison Avenues. Most of the residences in the area are multiunit buildings housing anywhere from two to twelve units. The buildings are all of wood-frame construction, with some finished in a brick veneer. There are five designs that are widely used, with a duplex configuration the single most numerous building type. Most of the block bounded by Central, Wright, Conger, and Harrison is an open field for public passive recreational use.

This residential area was laid out, built, and managed by the Queen City Cotton Company, and is the only company-built residential area of its type in the city. It was intended to be an entirely self-contained village, originally including a church, grocery stores, a school, and a billiard hall. The Queen City Cotton Company was established by George A. Draper, whose company was a major manufacturer of power looms. The company operated its mill east of the railroad until 1937, and sold off the residences, primarily to their tenants.

== See also ==
- National Register of Historic Places listings in Chittenden County, Vermont
