= Greystone Castle =

Historic house in Nevada, United States

- U.S. National Register of Historic Places
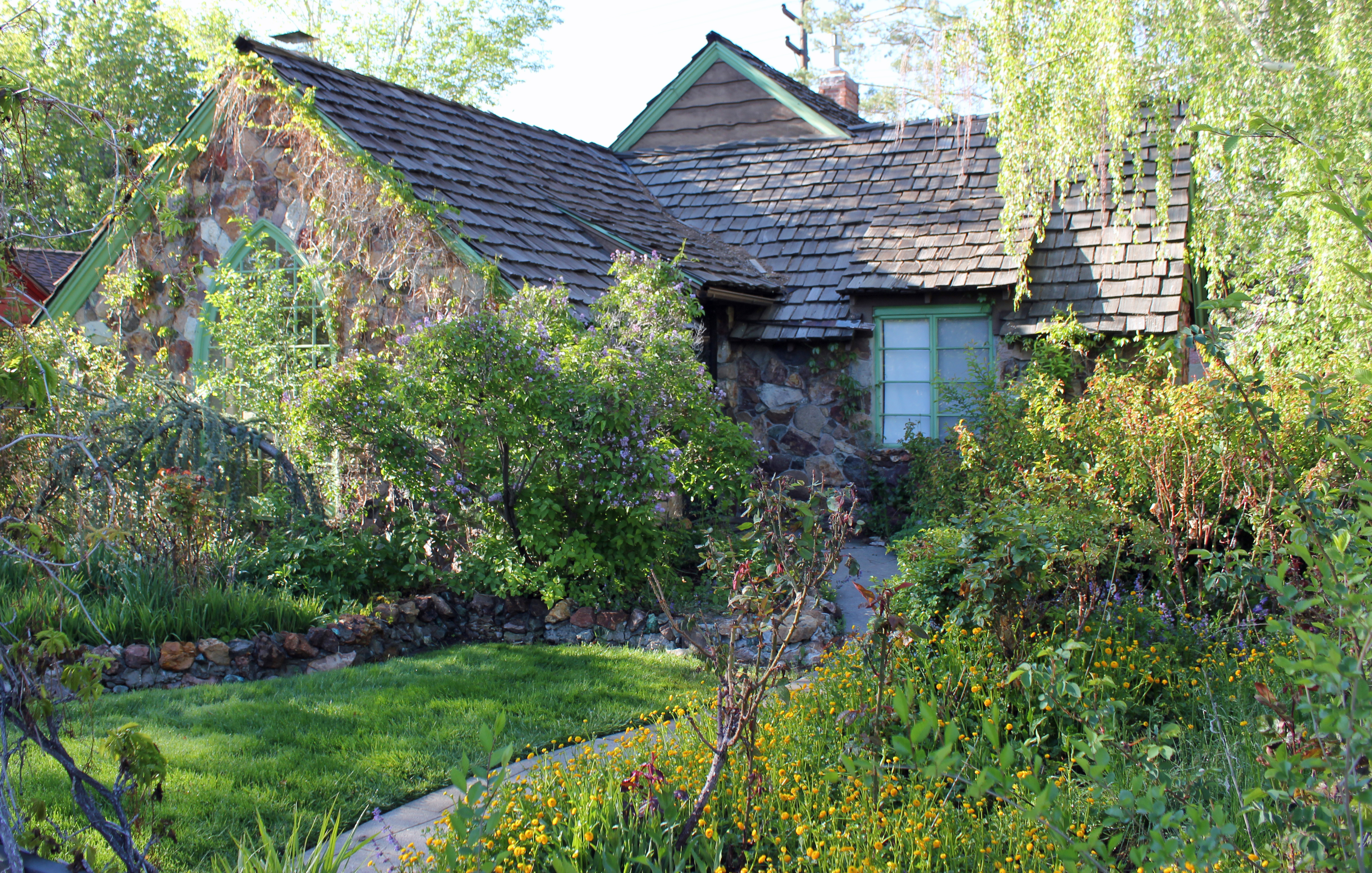

- Location within Nevada Location within the United States
- Location: 970 Joaquin Miller Dr., Reno, Nevada
- Coordinates: 39°30′47″N 119°49′11″W
- Area: less than one acre
- Built: 1930
- Architect: William Everett Barnard
- Architectural style: Tudor Revival
- NRHP reference No.: 02000875
- Added to NRHP: August 22, 2002

Greystone Castle is a small Tudor style cottage in the Newlands Manor section of Reno, Nevada, USA. It was added to the National Register of Historic Places as an example of its architectural style as well as its ties into Reno's history as a migratory divorce town. Starting with the William E. Corey divorce, Reno became known for its much quicker and simpler divorce laws, the only requirement being that the individuals had to stay in town for six months to achieve residency. Greystone Castle is the type of smaller upscale housing that divorcing individuals used during their waiting period.
