= Graystone Pines =

Condominium in Salt Lake City, Utah, US

Coordinates: 40.712957°N 111.853943°W

Graystone Pines is a condominium building located at 2730 Highland Drive, Salt Lake City, Utah, United States. It was built in 1960 and was the first condominium built in the United States. Keith Romney acted as legal counsel for the building developers.
