= Greystone Mill Historic District =

Historic district in Rhode Island, United States

- U.S. National Register of Historic Places
- U.S. Historic district
- U.S. Historic district – Contributing property
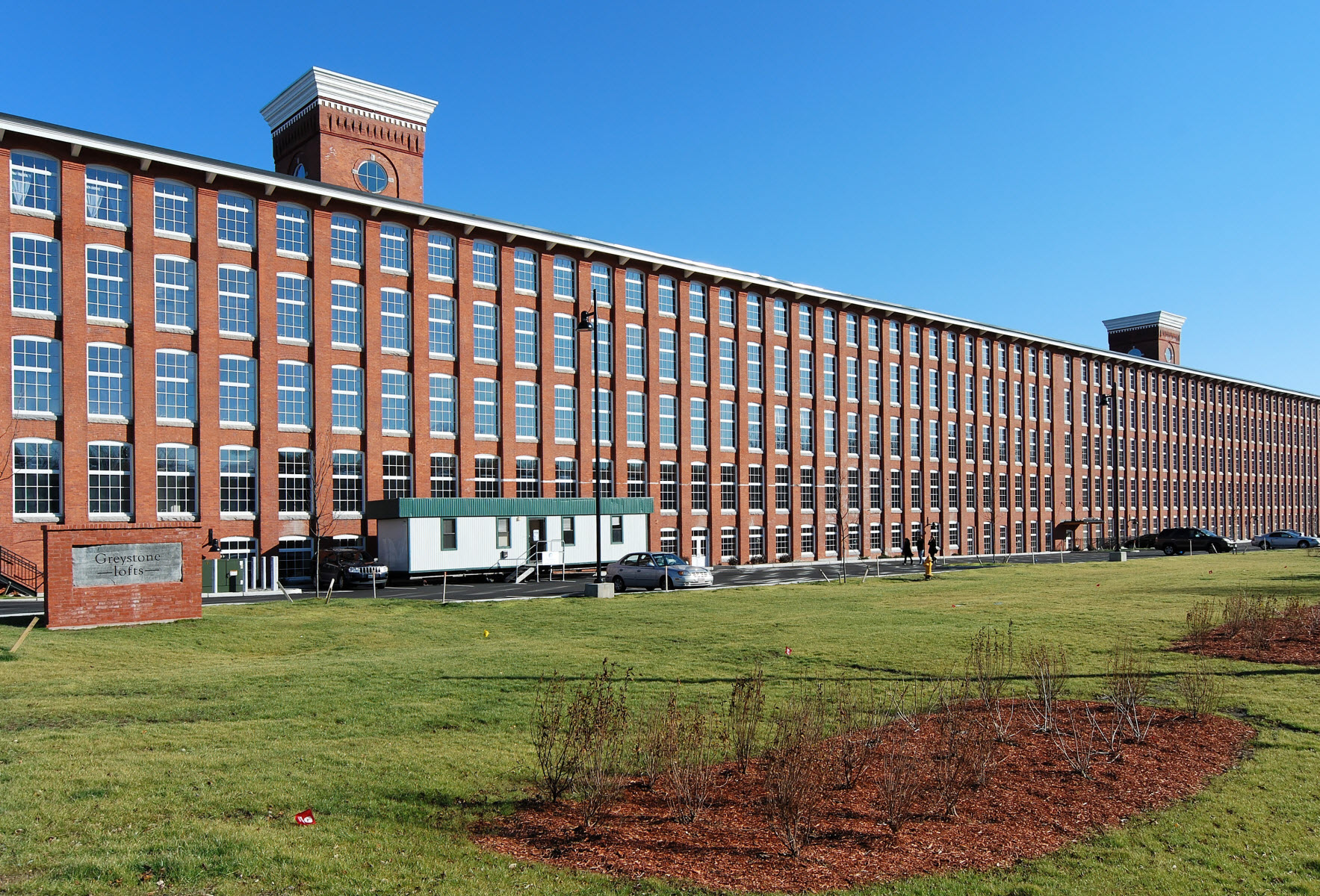
- Greystone Mills, recently restored into residences

- Location within Rhode Island Location within the United States
- Location: North Providence, Rhode Island
- Coordinates: 41.86451°N 71.49012°W
- Built: 1904
- Architect: Sheldon, Frank P. & Son
- Part of: Greystone Historic District (ID07001343)
- NRHP reference No.: 04000378

Significant dates
- Added to NRHP: April 28, 2004
- Designated CP: January 2, 2008

The Greystone Mill Historic District encompasses an early 20th-century textile mill complex on Greystone Avenue in Johnston and North Providence, Rhode Island. The complex consists of three brick buildings on the North Providence side of the Woonasquatucket River, a dam spanning the river, and a water tank near the dam in Johnston. The main structure consists of a series of structures combined to form a rambling structure, built between 1904 and 1911 to designs by Frank Sheldon and Son, an architectural firm that was a leading designer of textile facilities at the time.

The mill complex was listed on the National Register of Historic Places in 2004. Its elements also contribute to the Greystone Historic District, listed in 2008.

== See also ==
- National Register of Historic Places listings in Providence County, Rhode Island
