= Grey Stone Baptist Church =

Baptist church in Durham, North Carolina

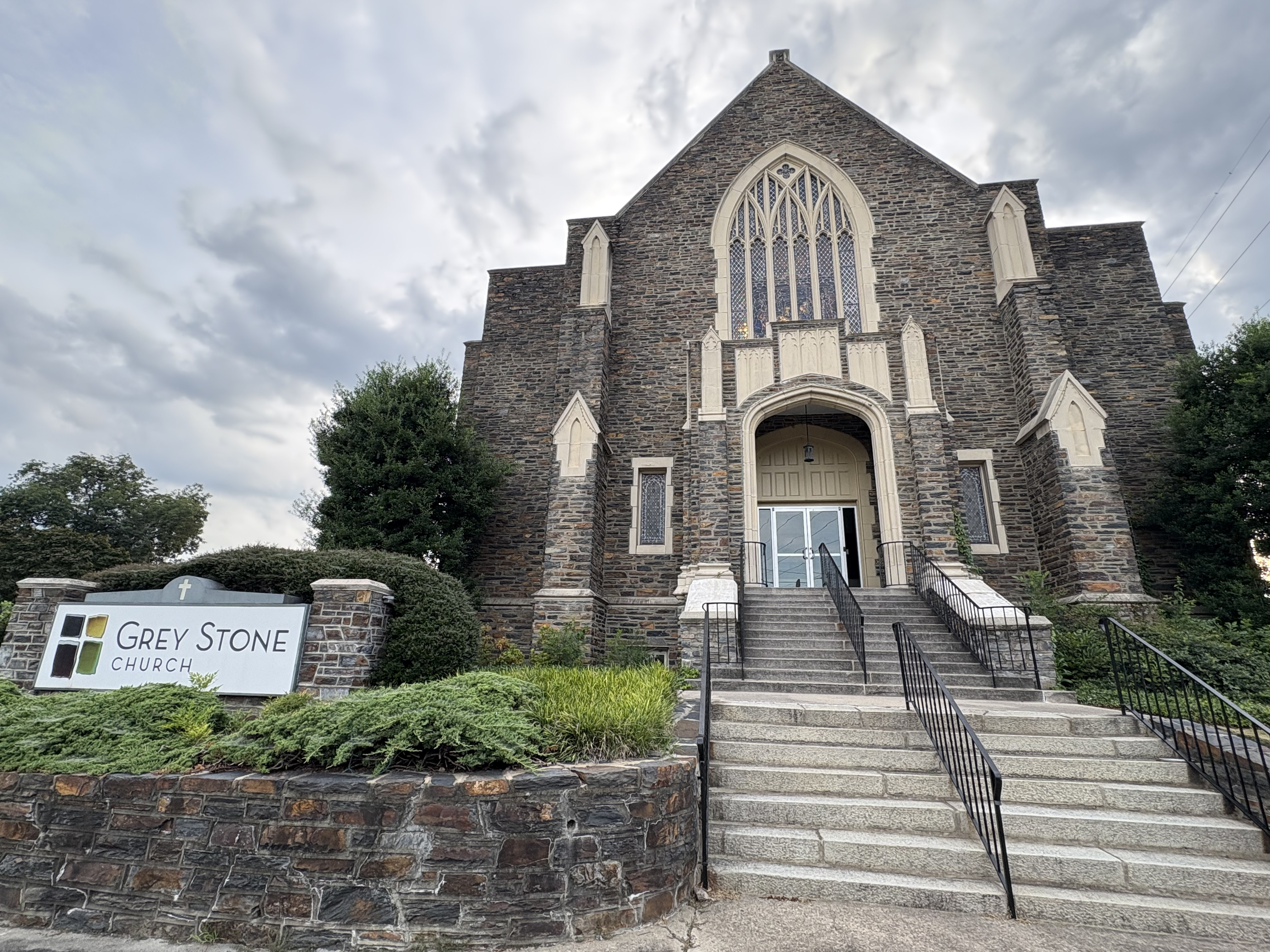
- Grey Stone Church in 2025

Religion
- Affiliation: Southern Baptist
- Status: Active

Location
- Location: 2601 Hillsborough Road; Durham, North Carolina, United States
- Interactive map of Grey Stone Baptist Church
- Coordinates: 36.0105°N 78.9291°W

Architecture
- Architects: Atwood and Weeks
- Type: Gothic Revival
- Completed: 1936

Website
- greystonechurch.com

Grey Stone Baptist Church, formerly West Durham Baptist Church, is a historic Southern Baptist church in the West Durham Historic District of Durham, North Carolina. The congregation was founded in 1894 and the current church building was completed in 1936.

== History ==
Grey Stone Church was founded by members of First Baptist Church in 1894 as West Durham Baptist Church on Main Street. The original building was destroyed by a storm in 1897. They built a second building, later that year, on Alexander Street.

By 1927, the congregation had more than 800 members. In 1929, they built another building on the corner of Athens Street and Nixon Street. In 1933, the congregation purchased a plot of land on the corner of Hillsborough Road and 15th Street in West Durham. A new gothic style church building, constructed by the architectural firm Atwood and Weeks using the same stone that had been used to build Duke University West Campus, was completed in 1936.

In 1949, the congregation changed its name to Grey Stone Baptist Church in order to distinguish it from the African-American congregation also named West Durham Baptist Church. Additions and expansions to the church were made in the 1960s, 1970s, and 1980s.

Grey Stone Church is a member of the Southern Baptist Convention.
