= Greystone Historic District =

Historic district in Rhode Island, United States

- U.S. National Register of Historic Places
- U.S. Historic district
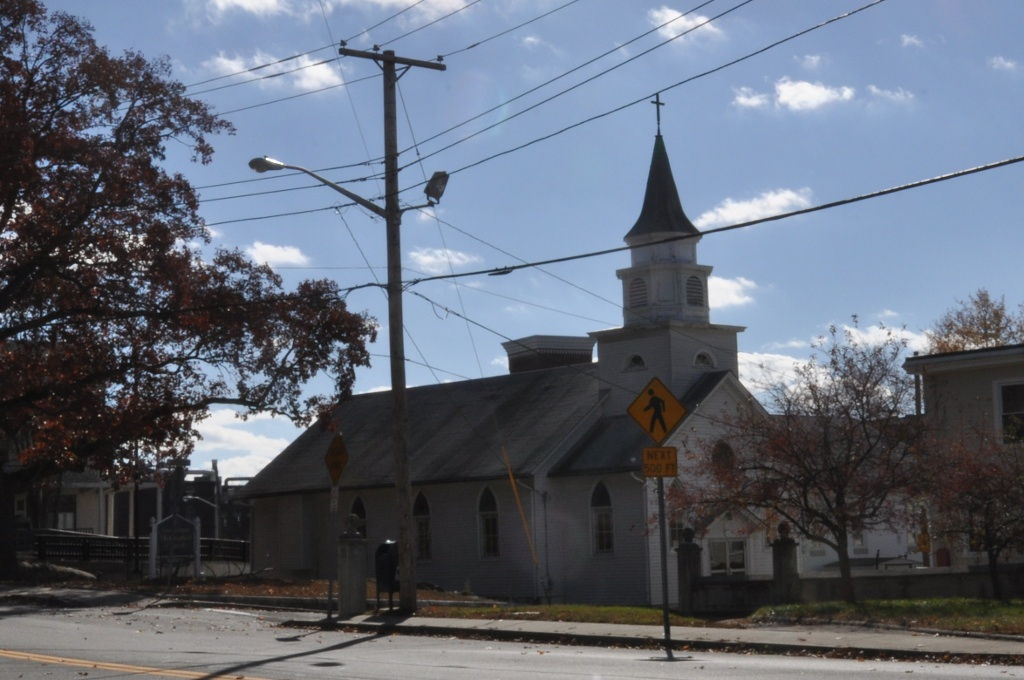
- The church in Greystone Village

- Location within Rhode Island Location within the United States
- Location: 1–16 Beckside Rd., 1–29 Greystone Ave., 1–24 Oakleigh Ave., 1–40 Langsberries Ave., 2–20 Larchmount Ave. N., 1–16 S., North Providence, Rhode Island; extends into Johnston
- Coordinates: 41.86631°N 71.49073°W
- Area: 28 acres (11 ha)
- Built: 1817
- Architect: Frank P Sheldon & Son
- NRHP reference No.: 07001343
- Added to NRHP: January 2, 2008

The Greystone Historic District is a historic district encompassing the early 20th-century mill village of Greystone in North Providence, Rhode Island. The district most significant elements is the Greystone Mill, a complex of brick industrial buildings on the North Providence side of the Woonasquatucket River, as well as the dam spanning the river and a water tank in Johnston. The village, entirely in North Providence, was developed between 1904 and 1912 by Joseph Benn and Company, the mill proprietors, to provide housing for its workers. The main focus of the village is on junction of Greystone Road and Oakleigh Avenue. The company built a variety of housing types, including duplexes and tenements, which line some of the side streets. There are four houses, dating as far back as 1822, that predate the primary industrial activity here. The most prominent feature of the village is the Greystone (Primitive) Methodist Church on Oakleigh Avenue.

The district was listed on the National Register of Historic Places in 2008.

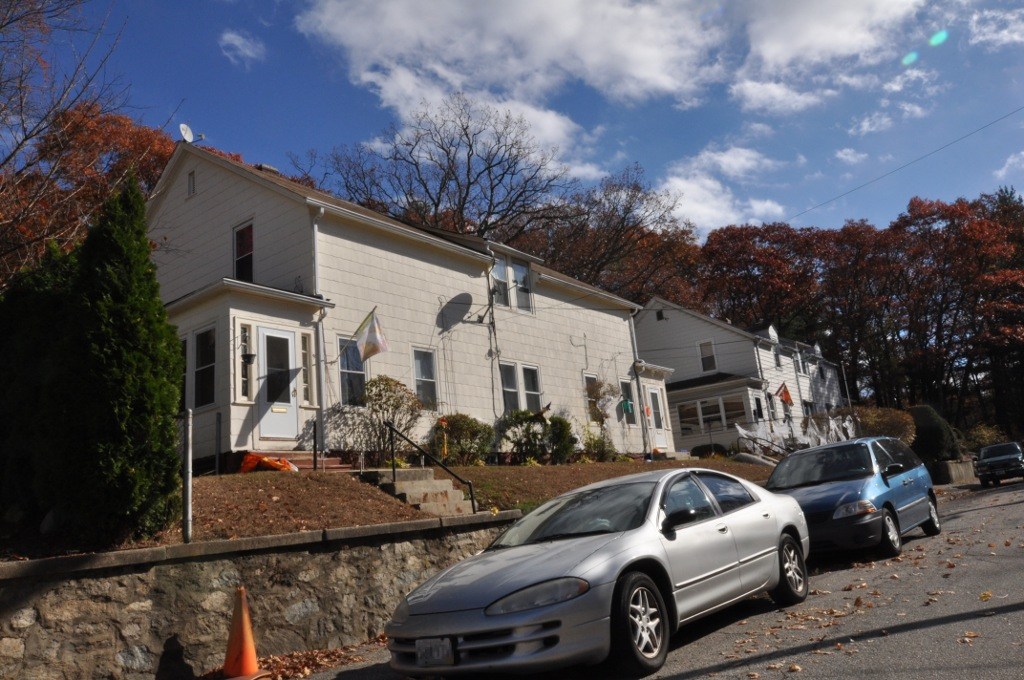
Mill worker housing in Greystone Village

== See also ==
- National Register of Historic Places listings in Providence County, Rhode Island
