= North Providence, Rhode Island =

- Town
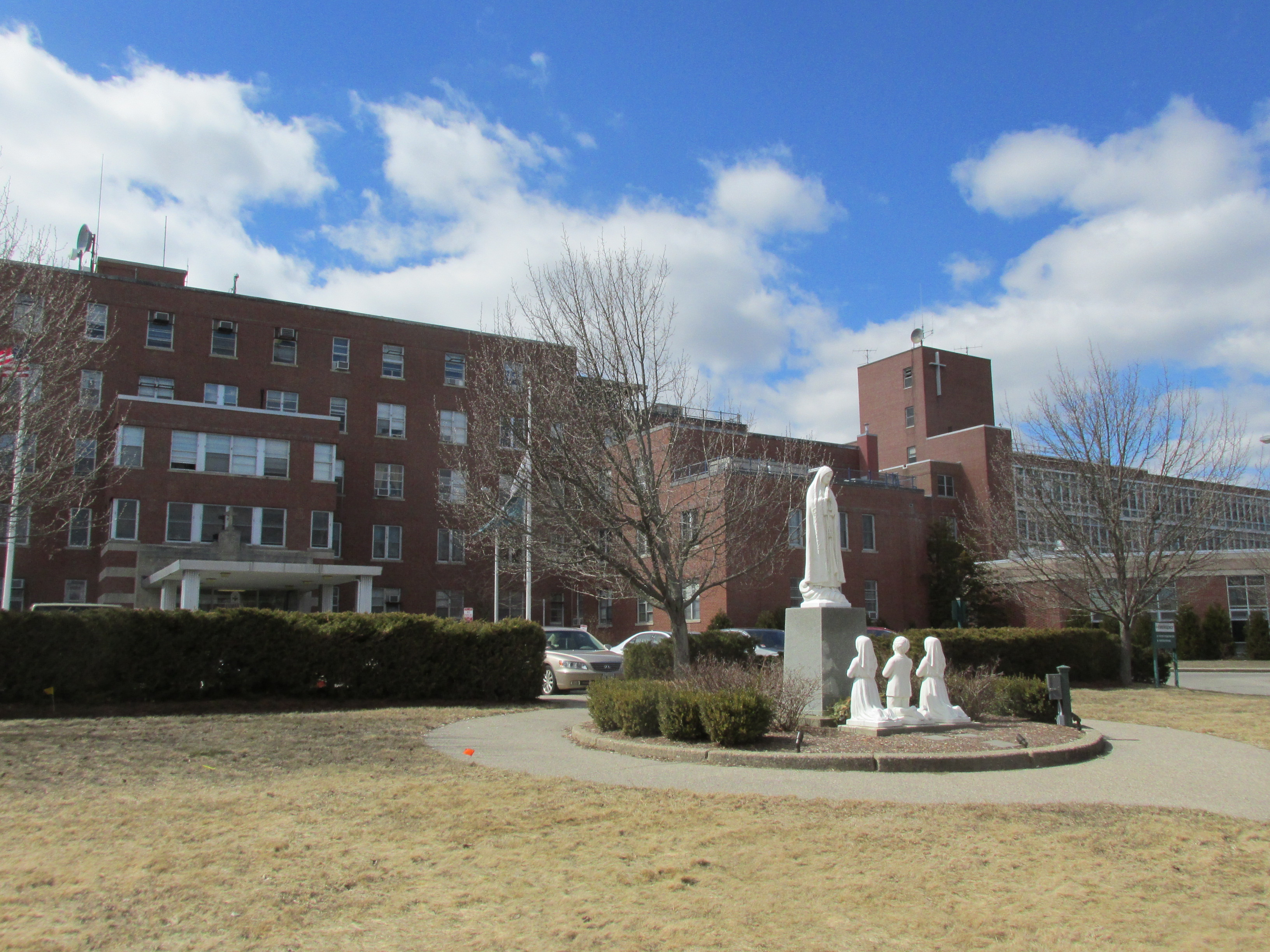
- Fatima Hospital

- Seal

- Location in Providence County and the state of Rhode Island.
- Coordinates: 41°51′36″N 71°27′23″W
- Country: United States
- State: Rhode Island
- County: Providence

Government
  - Type: Mayor-council
  - Mayor: Charles A. Lombardi
  - Town Council: Steven Loporchio (D); Ronald Baccala, Jr. (D); Nicholas Feola (D); Dino P. Autiello(D); Charles Pollock (D); Steven DiLorenzo (D); Mario Martone (D)

Area
  - Total: 5.8 sq mi (15.1 km^{2})
  - Land: 5.6 sq mi (14.6 km^{2})
  - Water: 0.077 sq mi (0.2 km^{2})
- Elevation: 207 ft (63 m)

Population (2020)
  - Total: 34,114
  - Density: 6,052/sq mi (2,336.6/km^{2})
- Time zone: UTC−5 (Eastern (EST))
  - Summer (DST): UTC−4 (EDT)
- ZIP codes: 02904, 02908, 02911
- Area code: 401
- FIPS code: 44-51760
- GNIS feature ID: 1219763
- Website: northprovidenceri.gov

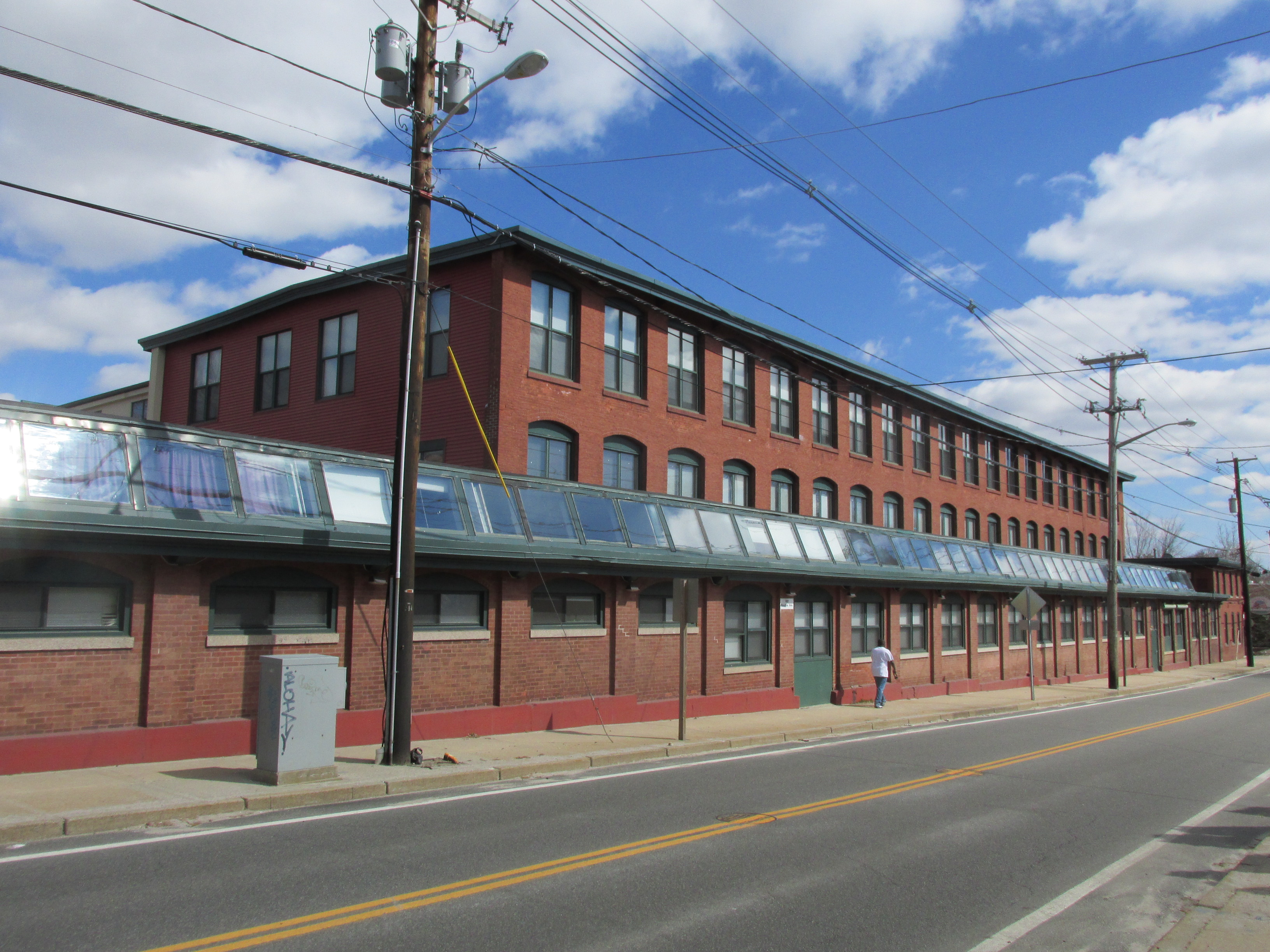
Geneva Mills in North Providence

North Providence is a town in Providence County, Rhode Island, United States. The population was 34,114 at the 2020 census.

== Geography ==
According to the United States Census Bureau, the Town of North Providence has a total area of 5.8 square miles (15 km^{2}), of which 5.7 square miles (15 km^{2}) is land and 0.1 square miles (0.26 km^{2}) is water. Since North Providence is officially incorporated as a town, it maintains the distinction as the smallest town in the smallest state. Although nearby Central Falls, at 1.29 square miles is geographically smaller than North Providence, Central Falls is incorporated as a city.

The Town of North Providence is bordered by Providence to the south, Johnston to the west, Smithfield and Lincoln to the north and Pawtucket to the east. Within the town, there are multiple neighborhoods and villages, such as Allendale, Centredale, Fruit Hill, Greystone, Louisquisset, Lymansville, Marieville, Woodville and Geneva. Additionally, the town is home to three large recreational parks, including Captain Stephen Olney Park, Governor John Notte Memorial Park and Peter Randall State Park. Notable bodies of water in the town include Canada Pond, Wenscott Reservoir and the Woonasquatucket River. As of 2020, the town has a total of seven elementary schools, two middle schools and one high school.

== History ==
Settled shortly after the arrival of Roger Williams in 1636, North Providence was incorporated as a town in 1765. The originally incorporated town area included sections of the present-day cities of Providence and Pawtucket. Early colonial settlers in North Providence built stone-ender houses, such as the Joseph Smith House (1705) at 109 Smithfield Road, which is now listed in the National Register of Historic Places. In 1793, the first fully mechanized cotton-spinning mill in the United States, Slater Mill, was founded by Samuel Slater on the banks of the Blackstone River in North Providence. In 1874, the eastern section of North Providence where Slater Mill is located became Pawtucket, resulting in a large population decrease.

From its incorporation, North Providence was governed by a Town Council with a Town Clerk and a Town Treasurer. In 1974, the residents of North Providence elected their first mayor, Salvatore Mancini, who served the town in this capacity for 20 years. Since the installation of the first town mayor, North Providence has had four mayors who were elected by town residents and one mayor who was elected by the Town Council when the incumbent mayor at the time, A. Ralph Mollis, was appointed to the position of Secretary of State of Rhode Island. Below is a list of mayors who have served North Providence:

- Salvatore Mancini (1974–1994)
- G. Richard Fossa (1994–1996)
- A. Ralph Mollis (1996–2007)
- John Sisto (2007–2007)
- Charles Lombardi (2007–present)

From at least 1921–1971, the Centredale Manor area of North Providence was contaminated by textile, chemical, and drum recycling industries that discarded toxic liquids and wastes into the surrounding soil and river (EPA 1999). In 2000, the United States Environmental Protection Agency declared a 9-acre (36,000 m^{2}) area including parts of Centredale Manor and Brook Village, both affordable housing units for senior citizens, a superfund site. The agency documented high levels of toxic chemicals like dioxin, VOCs, and PCBs in fish as well as soil from the area. Because of this the area has been fenced off from the community with warning signs against eating contaminated fish, and is undergoing evaluation for clean-up.

On May 4, 2010, three members of the North Providence Town Council were arrested by the FBI and charged in Federal Court with taking a $25,000 bribe so that a developer could build a supermarket in their town. After the arrests, Councilman Mansuet J. Giusti would become the new Town Council President and lead the remaining members out of difficult times to regain the trust of the public.

== Recreation ==
=== Parks ===
The town has two major parks, Governor John A. Notte Memorial Park and Capt. Stephen Olney Memorial Park, both have various sports fields, playgrounds; Gov. Notte Park has a freshwater beach and campground.

In 2015, Camp Meehan opened at Gov. Notte Park. Mayor Lombardi championed the sale of the land to the town of North Providence after it was to be built over by condominium housing. The Mayor allowed the land to be beautified using grant funds which were awarded to the town. Camp Meehan includes a newly renovated, modern building overlooking the Wenscott Reservoir which can house 250 guests for weddings and other such events. The Camp Meehan Hall held its first event in 2016.

=== Events ===
Currently, there are a few major annual events in the town:

- Mayor Lombardi's Fishing Derby is held each year at Governor Notte Park and receives wide turnouts from towns over.
- The Memorial Day Parade Celebration is a large event which includes town wide events, a large parade route leads to Gov. Notte Park where a festival is held.
- Independence Day celebrations are usually held at Gov. Notte Park as well, a fireworks display is a crowning part of this celebration.
- Pumpkins in the Park is also held at Halloween time, and like most events uses Notte Park as its setting. Residents are encouraged to see pumpkins put on display by the towns Youth Commission.
- The town also lights a Christmas tree on the front lawn of the town hall each year. It is a joyous occasion which includes refreshments, games, and music by Stephen Morrison and the North Providence High School Band, which provides entertainment for many of the towns events.

== Demographics ==
Historical population
Census	Pop.	Note	%±
1790	1,071		—
1800	1,067		−0.4%
1810	1,758		64.8%
1820	2,420		37.7%
1830	3,503		44.8%
1840	4,207		20.1%
1850	7,680		82.6%
1860	11,818		53.9%
1870	20,495		73.4%
1880	1,467		−92.8%
1890	2,084		42.1%
1900	3,016		44.7%
1910	5,407		79.3%
1920	7,697		42.4%
1930	11,104		44.3%
1940	12,156		9.5%
1950	13,927		14.6%
1960	18,220		30.8%
1970	24,337		33.6%
1980	29,188		19.9%
1990	32,090		9.9%
2000	32,411		1.0%
2010	32,078		−1.0%
2020	34,114		6.3%
U.S. Decennial Census

As of the census of 2020, there were 34,114 people and 14,696 households in the town. The population density was 6,052 inhabitants per square mile (2,337/km^{2}). There were 15,932 housing units in the town. The racial makeup of the town was 71.54% White, 8.29% African American, 0.43% Native American, 3.18% Asian, 0.03% Pacific Islander, 7.23% from other races, and 9.3% from two or more races. 14.46% of the population were Hispanic or Latino of any race.

There were 14,696 households, out of which 24.5% had children under the age of 18 living with them, 37.7% were married couples living together, 32.5% had a female householder with no spouse present, and 20.2% had a male householder with no spouse present. 16.4% of all households were made up of individuals, and 4.7% had someone living alone who was 65 years of age or older. The average household size was 2.28 and the average family size was 2.99.

In the town, the population was spread out, with 18.9% under the age of 18, 5.9% from 18 to 24, 29.6% from 25 to 44, 24.1% from 45 to 64, and 21.5% who were 65 years of age or older. The median age was 41 years.

The median income for a household in the town was $80,854, and the median income for a family was $99,175. The per capita income for the town was $42,658. About 9% of the population were below the poverty line, including 8.2% of those under age 18 and 12.5% of those age 65 or over.

== Education ==
Part of Rhode Island College is in North Providence.

== Notable people ==
- John Cafferty, leader of John Cafferty & The Beaver Brown Band
- Ernie DiGregorio, former NBA player
- Jim Gilchrist, founder of the controversial Minuteman Project
- Al Gomes, record producer, music industry strategist, historian, and songwriter
- Danielle Lacourse, Miss Rhode Island USA 2007; first runner-up at Miss USA 2007
- Joseph Olney, American privateer during American Revolution
- Chris Sparling, screenwriter and director
- Zellio Toppazzini, NHL – AHL hockey player; Rhode Island Reds Player of the Century; Providence College head coach
- Cody Wild, former AHL hockey player
- Joseph A. Zinno, inventor of the first human-powered aircraft to have flown in the United States (Zinno Olympian ZB-1)

== Friendship cities ==
- Jardar, Artsakh
