= C. R. Makepeace & Company =

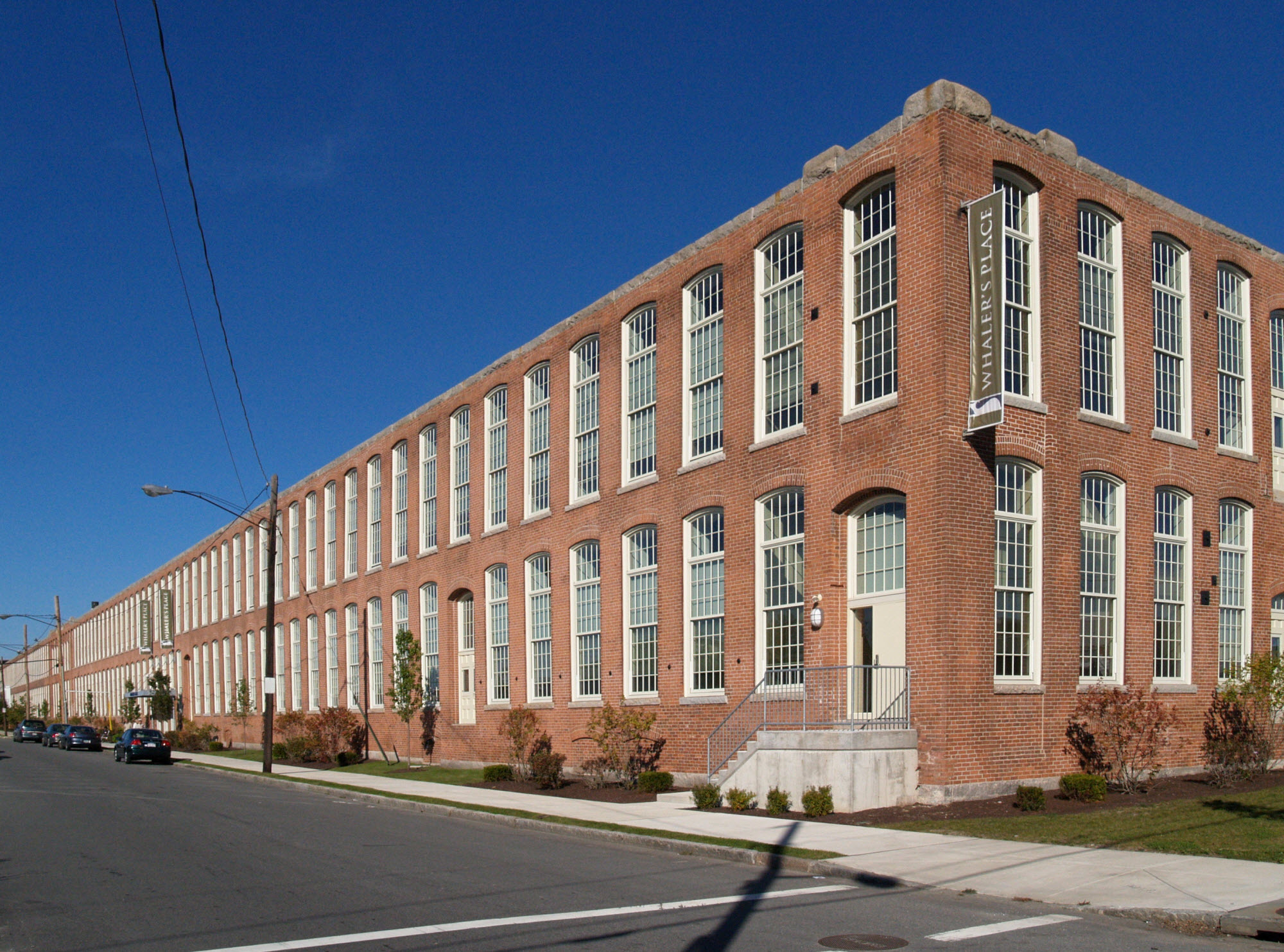
Whitman Mills, New Bedford, 1895.

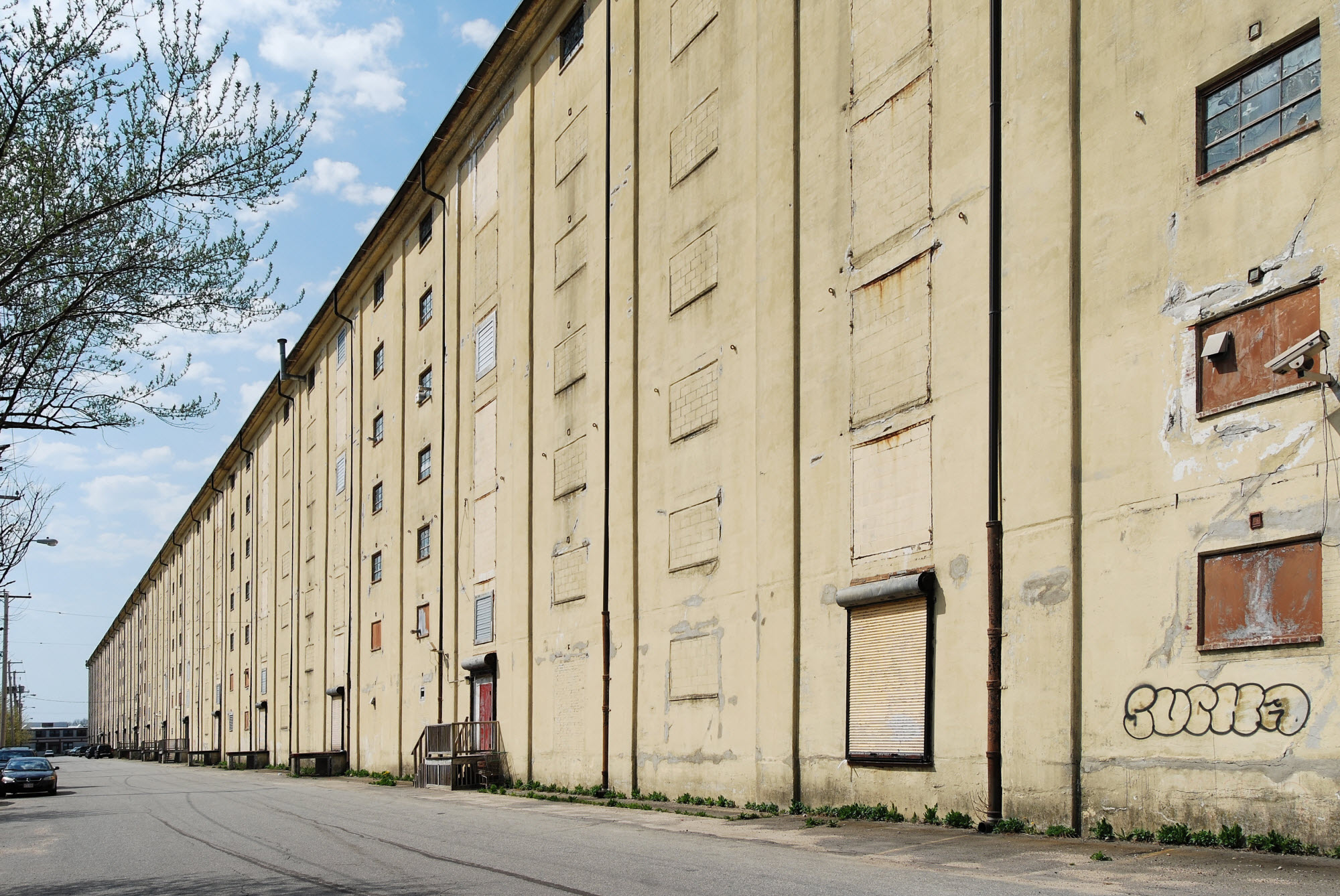
Belleville Warehouse, New Bedford, 1916.

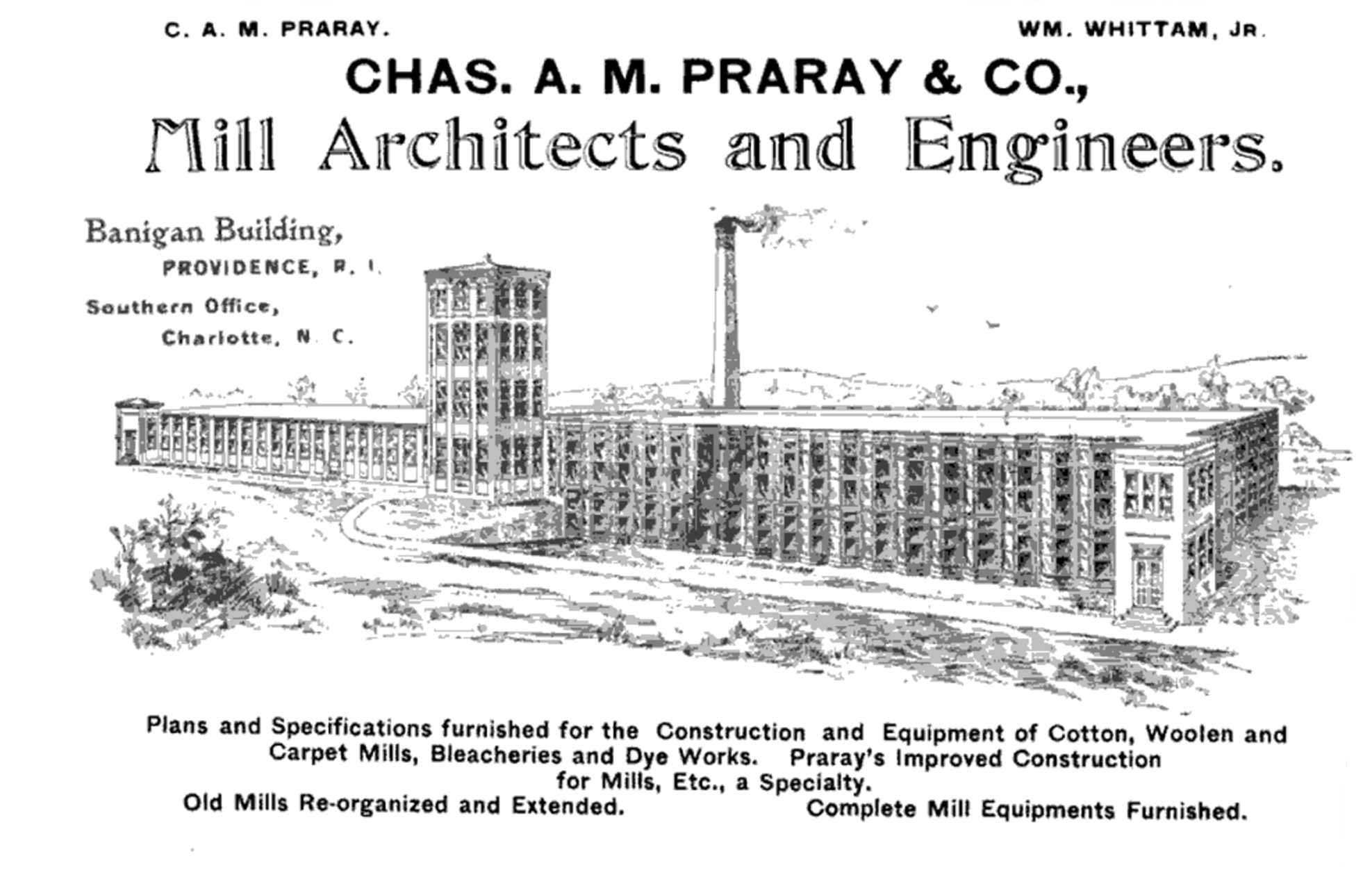
Praray & Co. ad, 1898.

C. R. Makepeace & Company, established in 1889, was a nationally active firm of mill architects based in Providence, Rhode Island. It was dissolved in 1944.

== Charles R. Makepeace ==
Founder Charles R. Makepeace was born in Fayetteville, North Carolina on May 20, 1860. He attended Duke University, then known as Trinity College, but left without graduating in 1880. He then worked on a number of cotton mills in Randolph County, before eventually making his way to Rhode Island. He first practiced as a member of D. M. Thompson & Company in Providence. When David M. Thompson left the partnership to manage mills for B. B. & R. Knight, Makepeace formed a new partnership, Hall & Makepeace, with established architect Clifton A. Hall. This lasted from 1884 to 1886. Hall was prominent as both a designer of industrial buildings as well as those that normally made up an architect's practice.

In 1886 Makepeace left, and opened his own office. He established C. R. Makepeace & Company in 1889. Circa 1892 he made his designer, Charles A. M. Praray, a partner. He added new associates when Praray left in 1898. Makepeace's son, the MIT-trained C. Salisbury Makepeace, joined the office in 1916, upon graduating. Makepeace was an active member of Central Congregational Church in Providence. Makepeace was a member of the Providence common council from the second ward from 1904 to 1910.

== Later history ==
After Makepeace's death in 1926, the company was presumably managed by C. Salisbury Makepeace. Henry A. McClean purchased the firm in 1928, and managed it until 1944, when it was dissolved. McClean died in West Warwick in 1950. C. Salisbury Makepeace died in August 1949.

== Charles A. M. Praray ==
Charles Praray first emerges as the chief designer and construction engineer of the Makepeace firm, and was made a partner circa 1892. As designer, in 1894, he patented what was known as "Praray's Improved Construction", a system of mill construction which separated the structure of the roof and floors of a mill from that of the walls, allowing much more daylight to enter the building. Visually, Praray's design may be most noted for its unusual window patterns, which emerge from the brick piers in a zig-zag pattern. Only five of these mills have been documented as being built, but Chas. A. M. Praray & Company touted it in advertisements for many years. Prior to its demolition around 2014, the Selma Cotton Mill of 1896 in Alabama was the best-preserved example of Praray's mill design. The only surviving example with walls intact is one of the Holt mills in Haw River, North Carolina.

Praray has also been identified as the designer of Makepeace & Co.'s Petersburg Silk Mills in Scranton, Pennsylvania, designed in 1897. He prepared "several sets" of designs, one of which was likely to be a Praray's Improved Construction design. However, this was rejected in favor of a conventional design.

In 1898 Praray left to establish his own office, Chas. A. M. Praray & Company, with William Whittam, Jr. The firm had two offices, one at Providence, and one at Charlotte, North Carolina, managed by Whittam. The partnership existed until about 1909. Praray then took his son, Charles W. Praray, into partnership, as C. A. M. Praray & Son. He died in 1910.

== Projects ==
=== Charles R. Makepeace, 1886-1889 ===
- 1888 - Anderson Cotton Mill, 354 Railroad Cir, Anderson, South Carolina
  - Standing in ruins.

=== C. R. Makepeace & Company, 1889-1944 ===
- 1890 - Galveston Cotton and Woolen Mills, Winnie & 41st Sts, Galveston, Texas
  - Demolished in 1969.
- 1890 - Kearney Cotton Mill, Cottonmill Rd, Kearney, Nebraska
  - Ultimately demolished after never making a profit.
- 1890 - Overland Cotton Mill, 1314 W Evans Ave, Denver, Colorado
- 1891 - Mitchell Manufacturing Company Mill, 215 Cleghorn St, Fitchburg, Massachusetts
  - A project of A. Mitchell, Jr. & Sons of Glasgow, Scotland. Also an unlocated Providence mill.
- 1892 - Monument Mill No. 1, Front St, Housatonic, Massachusetts
- 1894 - River Spinning Mills, Villanova St, Woonsocket, Rhode Island
  - Burned in 2003.
- 1895 - Dixie Cotton Mill, 710 Greenville St, LaGrange, Georgia
  - The first mill utilizing Praray's patented design, though the distinctive windows have been removed.
- 1895 - Stonewall Cotton Mills, Erwin Rd, Stonewall, Mississippi
  - Demolished.
- 1895 - Whitman Mills, Riverside Ave, New Bedford, Massachusetts
- 1896 - Selma Cotton Mills, 218 Morgan Ave, Selma, Alabama
  - Prior to its 2014 demolition, this was the best extant example of Praray's system.
- 1897 - Georgia Western Cotton Mill, 6398 E Broad St, Douglasville, Georgia
  - A Praray mill, burned in 2012.
- 1897 - Petersburg Silk Mills, 800 James Ave, Scranton, Pennsylvania
- 1898 - Cora Mill, Gravel St, Haw River, North Carolina
  - The last of Praray's patented mills, and the only one to retain its unusual shape.
- 1899 - Aragon Mill, Taylorsville Rd, Aragon, Georgia
  - Burned.
- 1899 - Edenton Cotton Mill, 723 E King St Ext, Edenton, North Carolina
- 1901 - Lowe Mill, 2211 Seminole Dr SW, Huntsville, Alabama
- 1902 - Arcadia Mill No. 1, 1875 Hayne St, Spartanburg, South Carolina
- 1902 - Brogan Mill, 500 Glenn St, Anderson, South Carolina
  - Demolished.
- 1902 - Lincoln Cotton Mill, 1401 Park St, Evansville, Indiana
  - Demolished.
- 1903 - Manomet Mill No. 1, 194 Riverside Ave, New Bedford, Massachusetts
- 1905 - Wanskuck Mill No. 2, 711 Branch Ave, Wanskuck, Rhode Island
- 1905 - Whitinsville Spinning Ring Company Mill No. 2, 34 Douglas Rd, Whitinsville, Massachusetts
- 1906 - Minterburn Mill, 215 E Main St, Rockville, Connecticut
- 1906 - Nonquitt Spinning Mill No. 1, 630 Belleville Ave, New Bedford, Massachusetts
- 1906 - Swift Spinning Mills, 6801 Flat Rock Rd, Columbus, Georgia
  - Burned in 2011.
- 1906 - Taber Mills, 217 Deane St, New Bedford, Massachusetts
- 1907 - Manomet Mill No. 2, 200 Riverside Ave, New Bedford, Massachusetts
- 1909 - Nashawena Mills, 689 Belleville Ave, New Bedford, Massachusetts
- 1909 - Nonquitt Spinning Mill No. 2, 700 Belleville Ave, New Bedford, Massachusetts
- 1909 - Utica Fine Yarn/Spinning Mill, 2214 Whitesboro St, Utica, New York
- 1910 - Kilburn Mill No. 2, 89 Rodney French Blvd, New Bedford, Massachusetts
- 1911 - Crown Manufacturing Company Mill, 330 Turner St, Attleboro, Massachusetts
- 1912 - American Silk Spinning Mill No. 2, 10 Admiral St, Providence, Rhode Island
- 1912 - Chalmers Knitting Mills, 21-41 Bridge St, Amsterdam, New York
  - The four-story section. Demolished in 2011.
- 1912 - United Lace and Braid Company Factory, 530 Wellington Ave, Cranston, Rhode Island
  - The two-story section. Makepeace was a director of the company.
- 1915 - Australian Knitting Mills, 41-43 Stewart St, Melbourne, Victoria, Australia
- 1915 - William Barnet & Son Mill, 20 Forbes Ave, Rensselaer, New York
  - The large reinforced concrete section. Presently the Hilton Center for the Arts.
- 1915 - South Cotton Storehouse, 1 Chestnut St, Nashua Manufacturing Company, Nashua, New Hampshire
  - A predecessor to the larger Belleville Warehouse.
- 1916 - Belleville Warehouse, King St, New Bedford, Massachusetts
- 1916 - Chalmers Knitting Mills Addition, 21-41 Bridge St, Amsterdam, New York
  - The seven-story section. Demolished in 2011.
- 1916 - Crown Manufacturing Company Main Mill, 330 Turner St, Attleboro, Massachusetts
- 1917 - United Lace and Braid Company Factory Addition, 530 Wellington Ave, Cranston, Rhode Island
  - The three-story section.
- 1918 - Arlington Mills Repair Shop, 6 Lake St, Lawrence, Massachusetts
- 1919 - Bleachery Addition, 12 Technology Way, Nashua Manufacturing Co., Nashua, New Hampshire
- 1920 - Joseph P. Allen, Inc., Mill, 2 Main St, Dixfield, Maine
  - Demolished.
- 1922 - Arkwright-Interlaken Mills, 538 Main St, Arkwright, Rhode Island
- 1927 - Jewelers' Supply Company Building, 1144 Eddy St, Providence, Rhode Island
- 1933 - Greenville Finishing Company Addition, 711 Putnam Pk, Greenville, Rhode Island
- 1935 - Arkwright-Interlaken Mills Addition, 538 Main St, Arkwright, Rhode Island
- 1936 - Ward Building and Laundry, 7 Fleming Rd, Rhode Island State Infirmary, Howard, Rhode Island
- 1938 - Arkwright-Interlaken Mills Addition, 538 Main St, Arkwright, Rhode Island
- 1939 - Greenville Finishing Company Addition, 711 Putnam Pk, Greenville, Rhode Island
- 1942 - United States Rubbert Plant Expansion, 500 Wood St, Bristol, Rhode Island

== Gallery ==
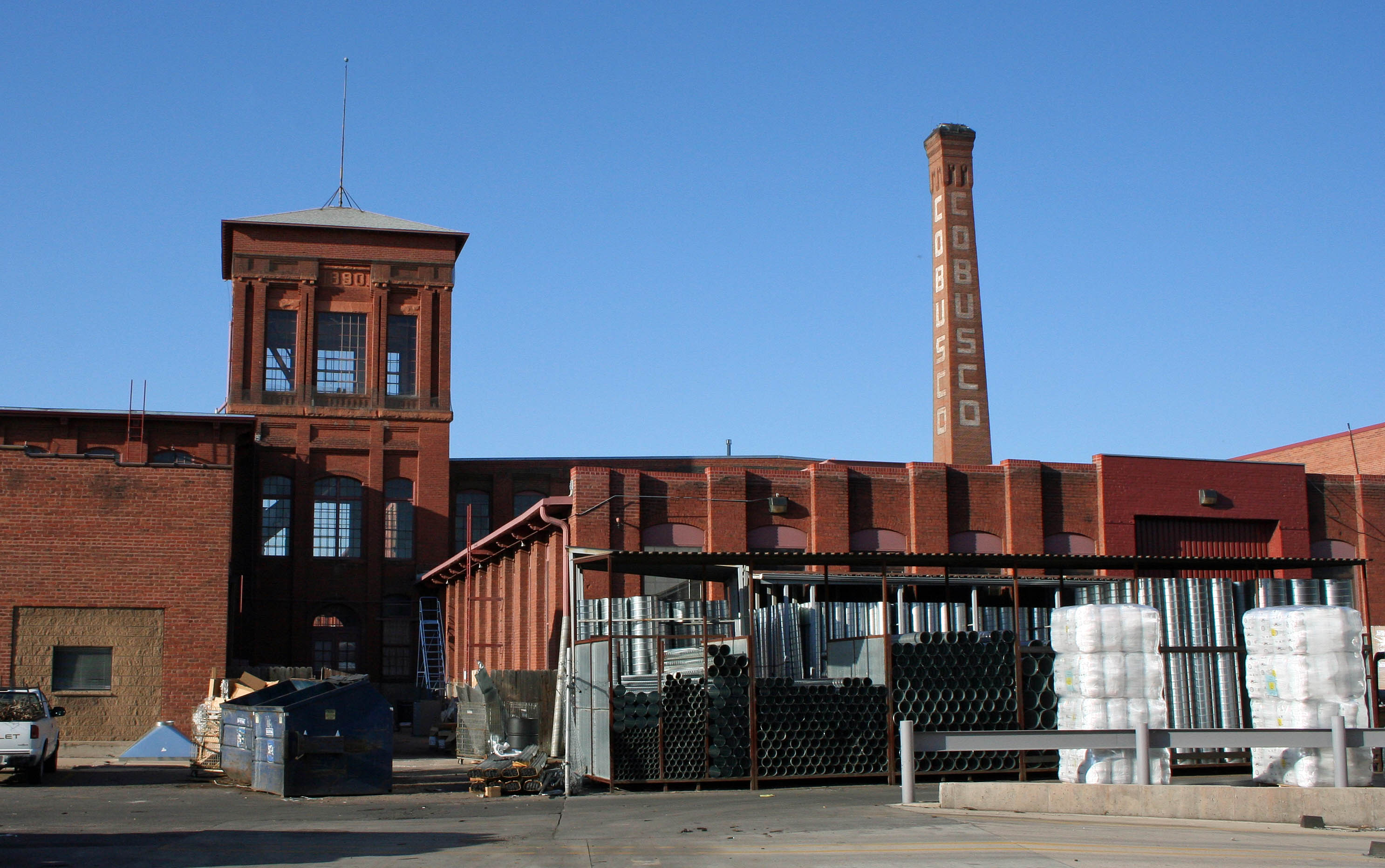
Overland Cotton Mill, Denver, 1890.

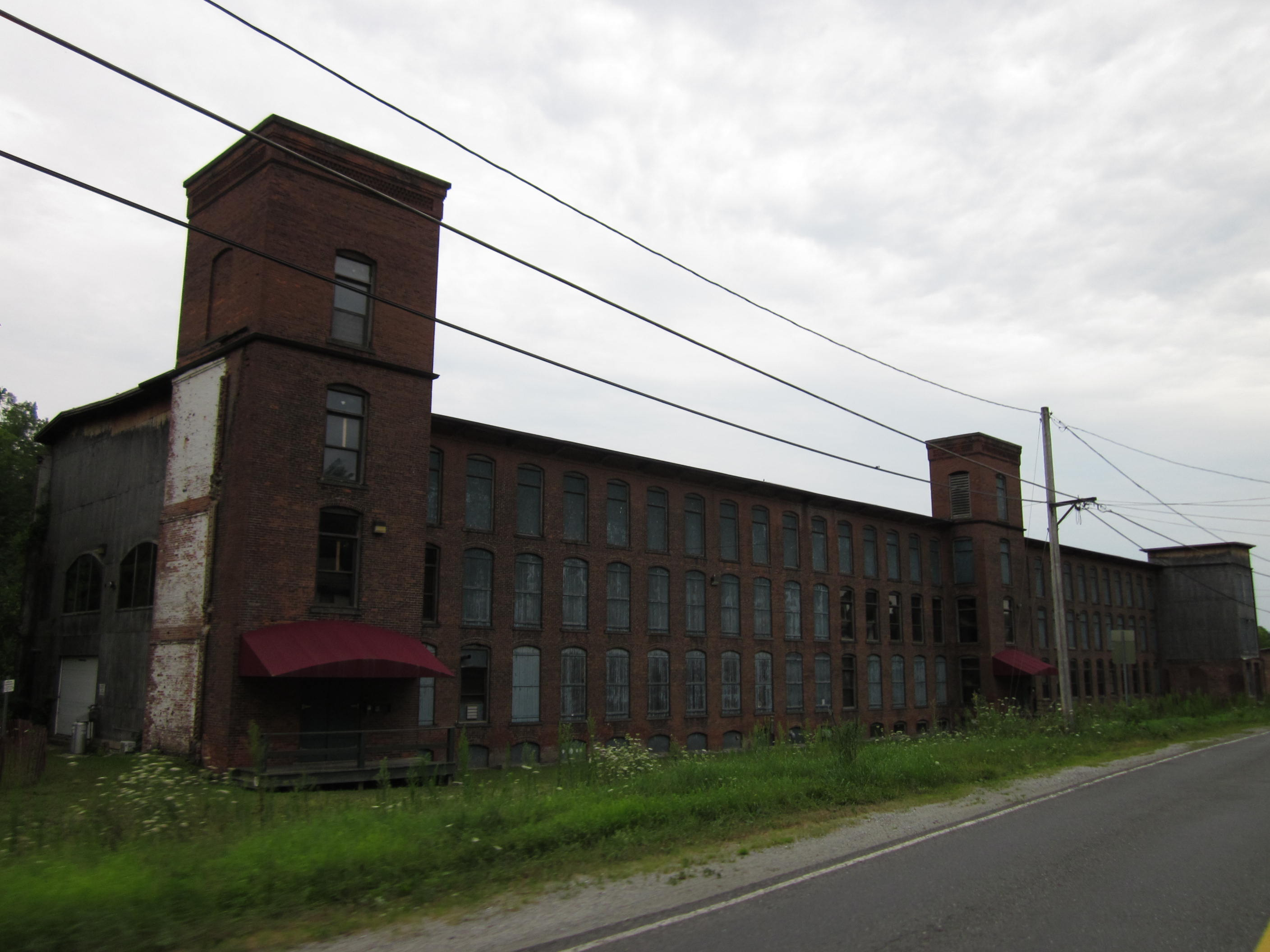
Monument Mill No. 1, Housatonic, 1892.

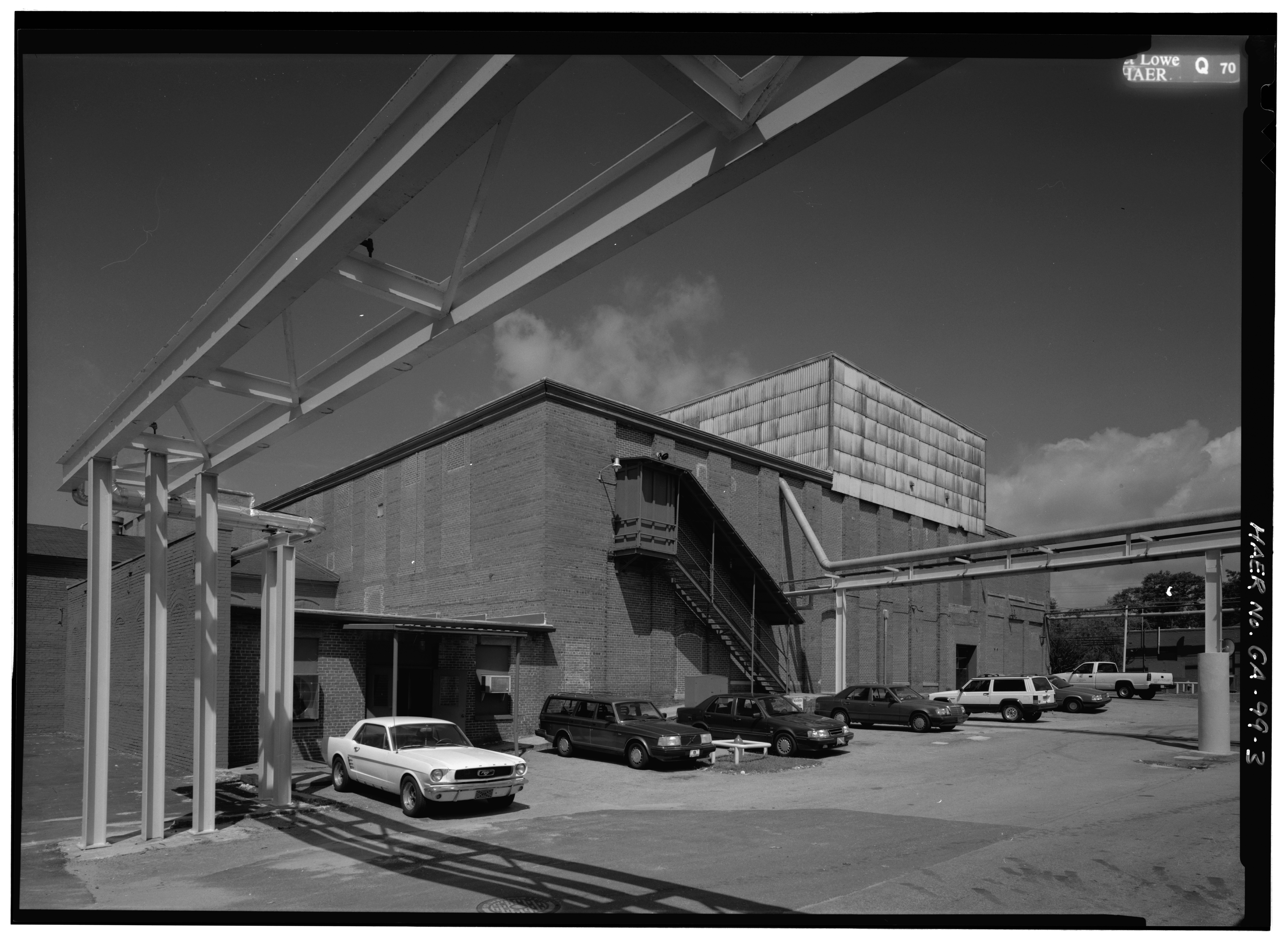
Dixie Cotton Mill, LaGrange, 1895.

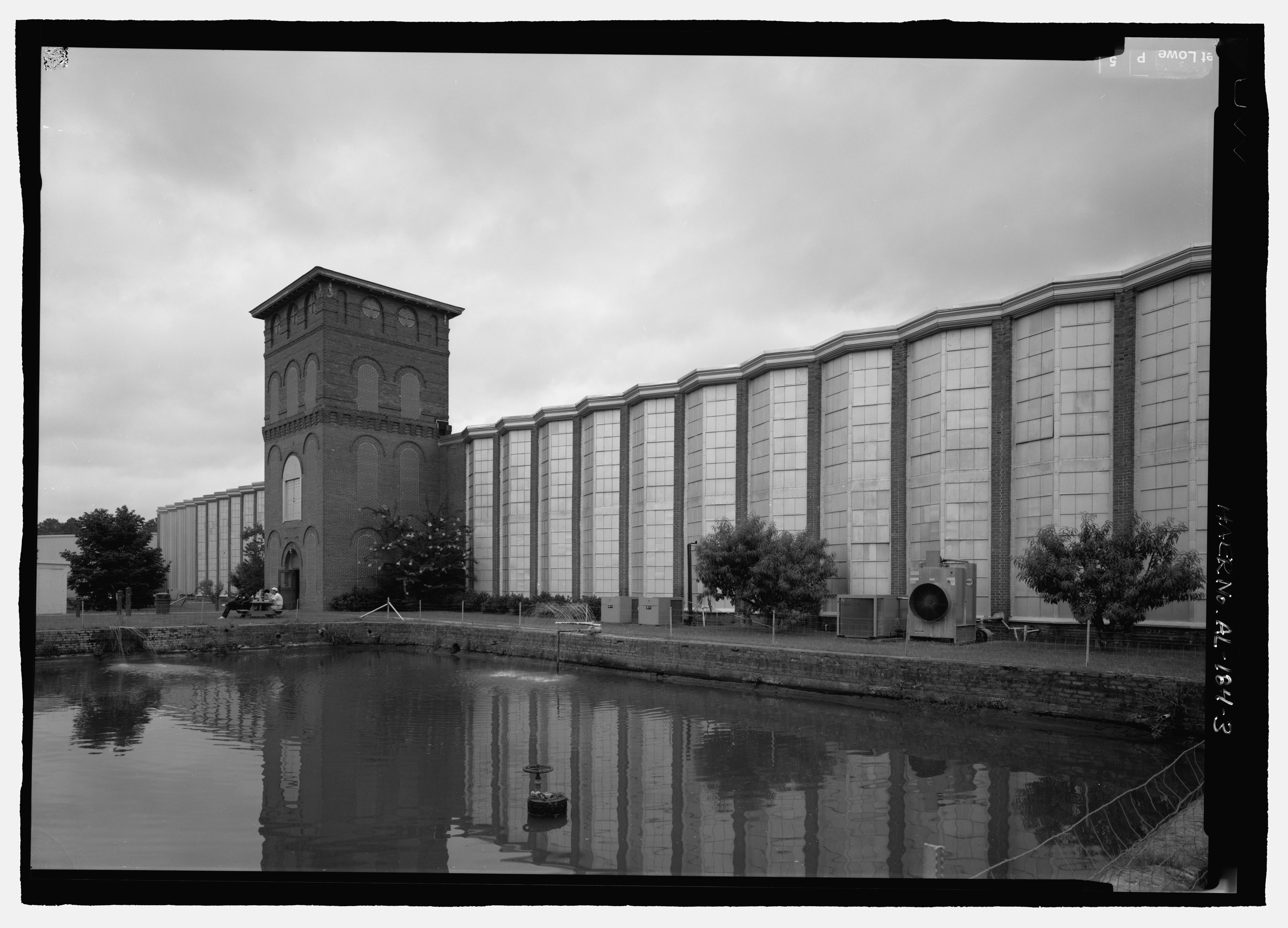
Selma Cotton Mill, Selma, 1896.

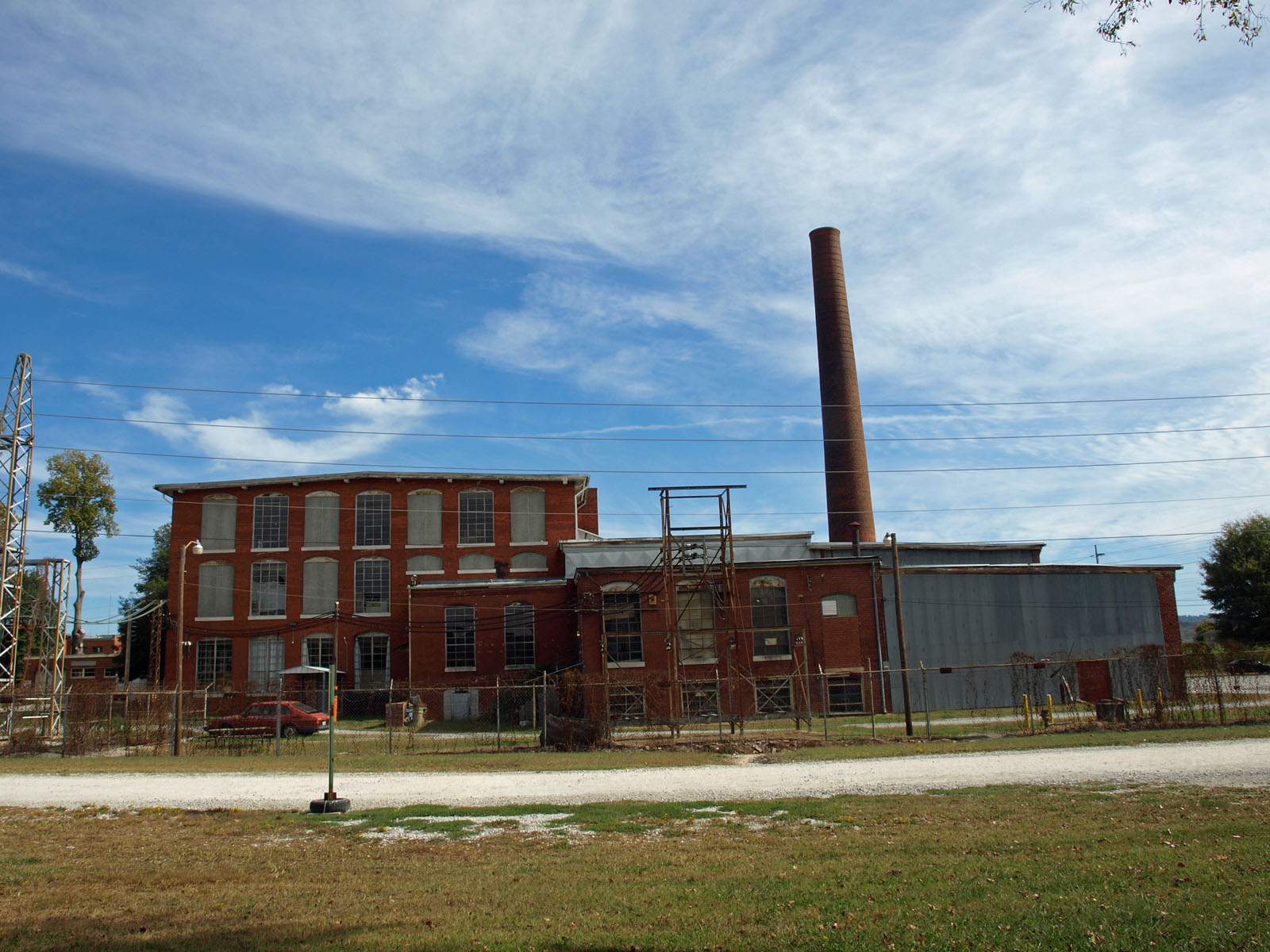
Lowe Mill, Huntsville, 1901.

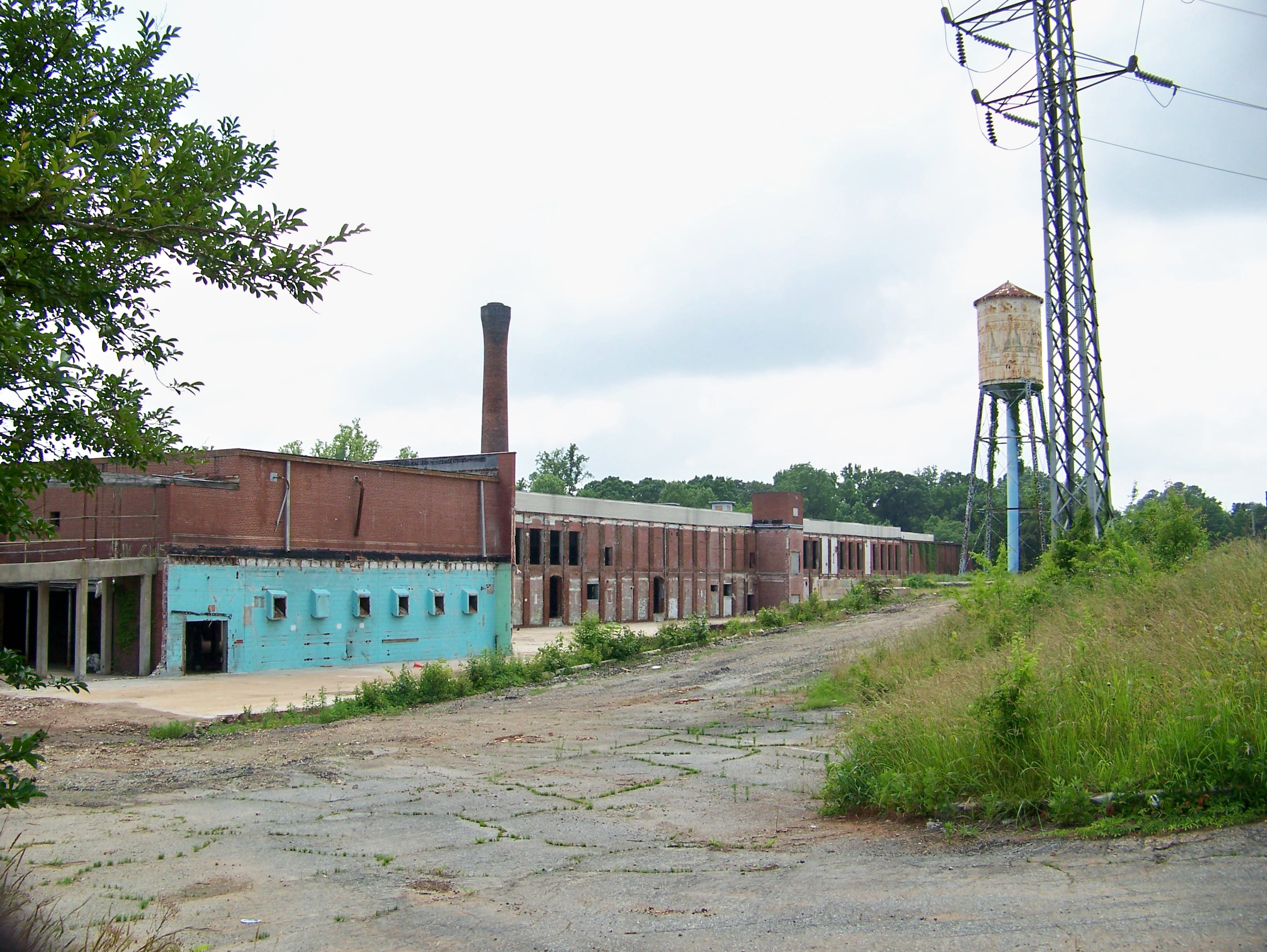
Arcadia Mill No. 1, Spartanburg, 1902.

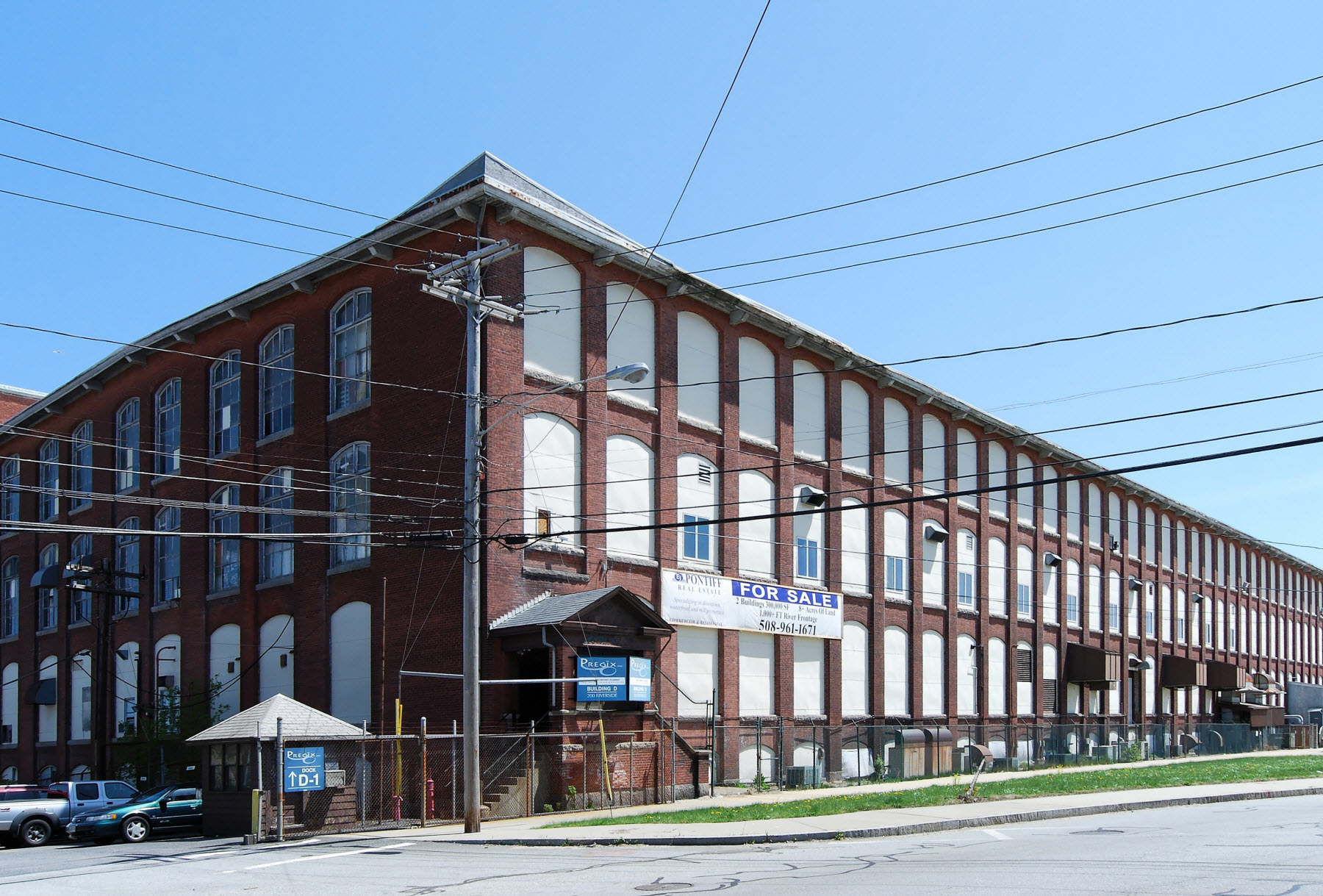
Manomet Mill No. 1, New Bedford, 1903.

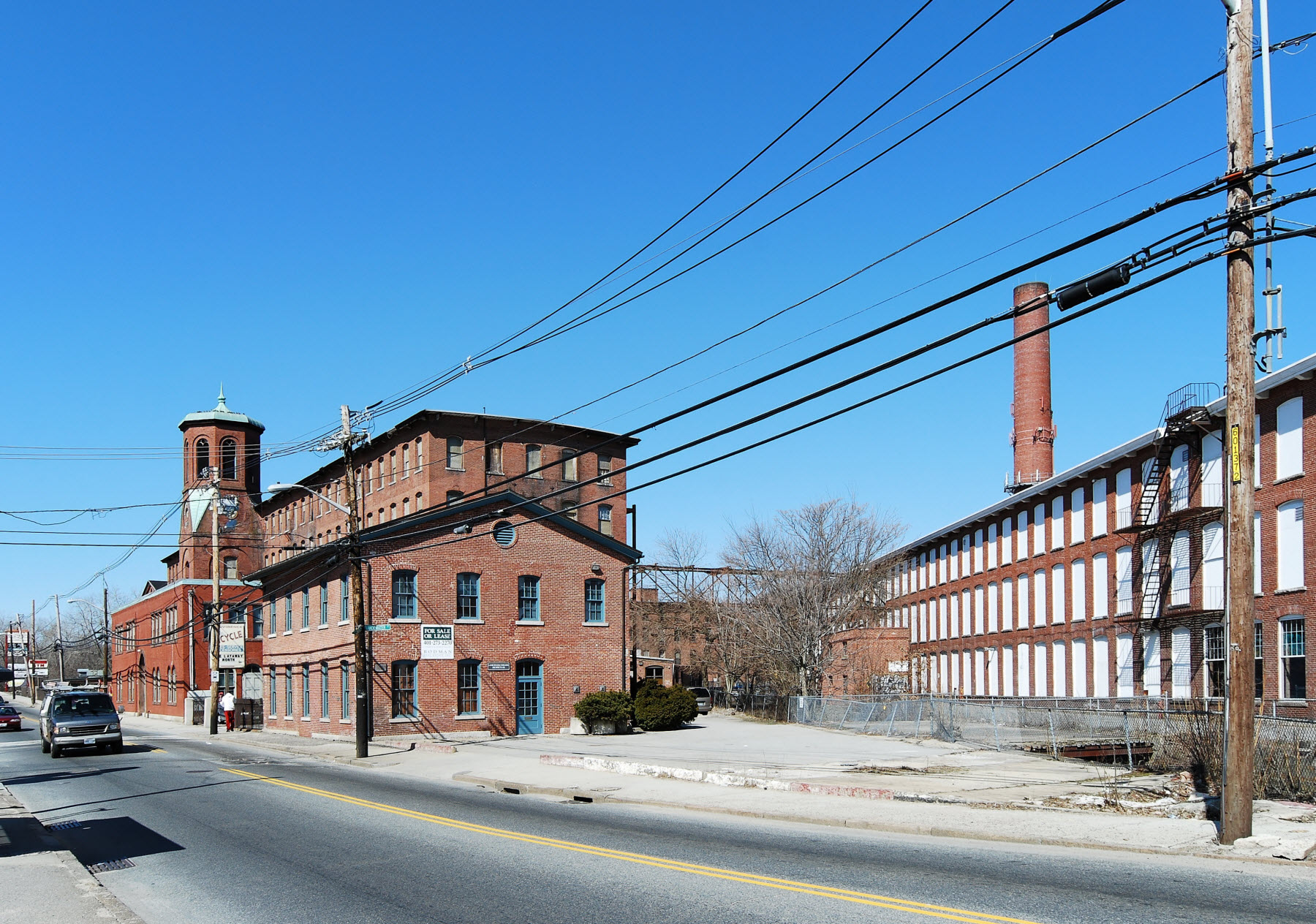
Wanskuck Mill No. 2 (at right), Wanskuck, 1905.

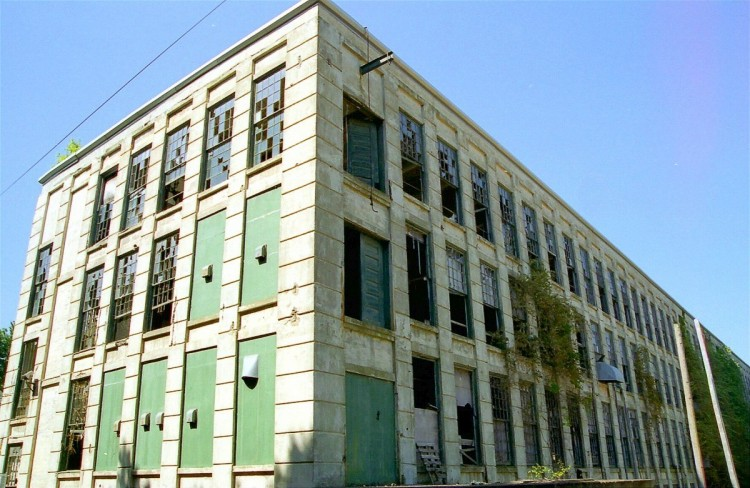
Minterburn Mill, Rockville, 1906.

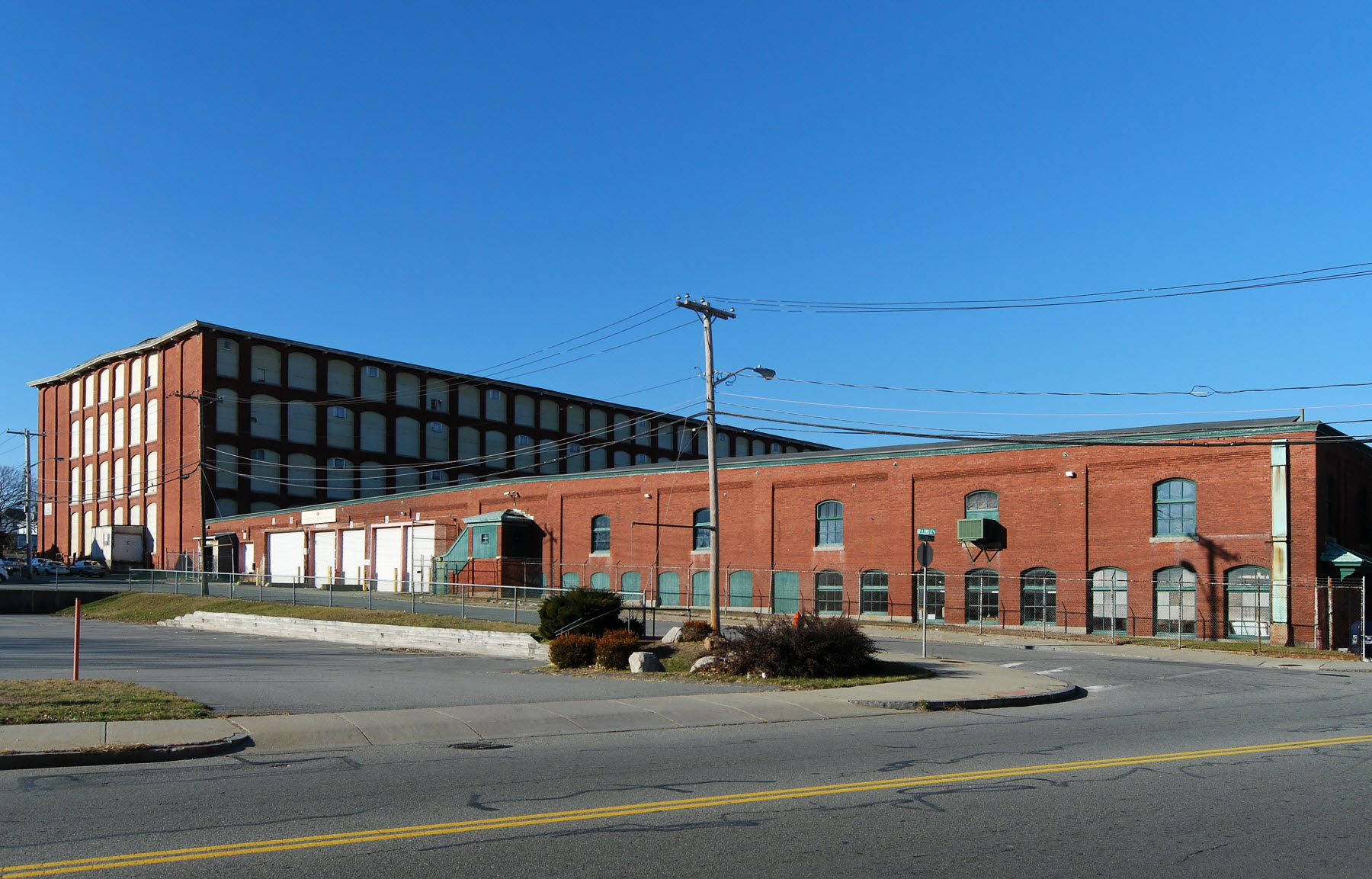
Nashawena Mills, New Bedford, 1909.

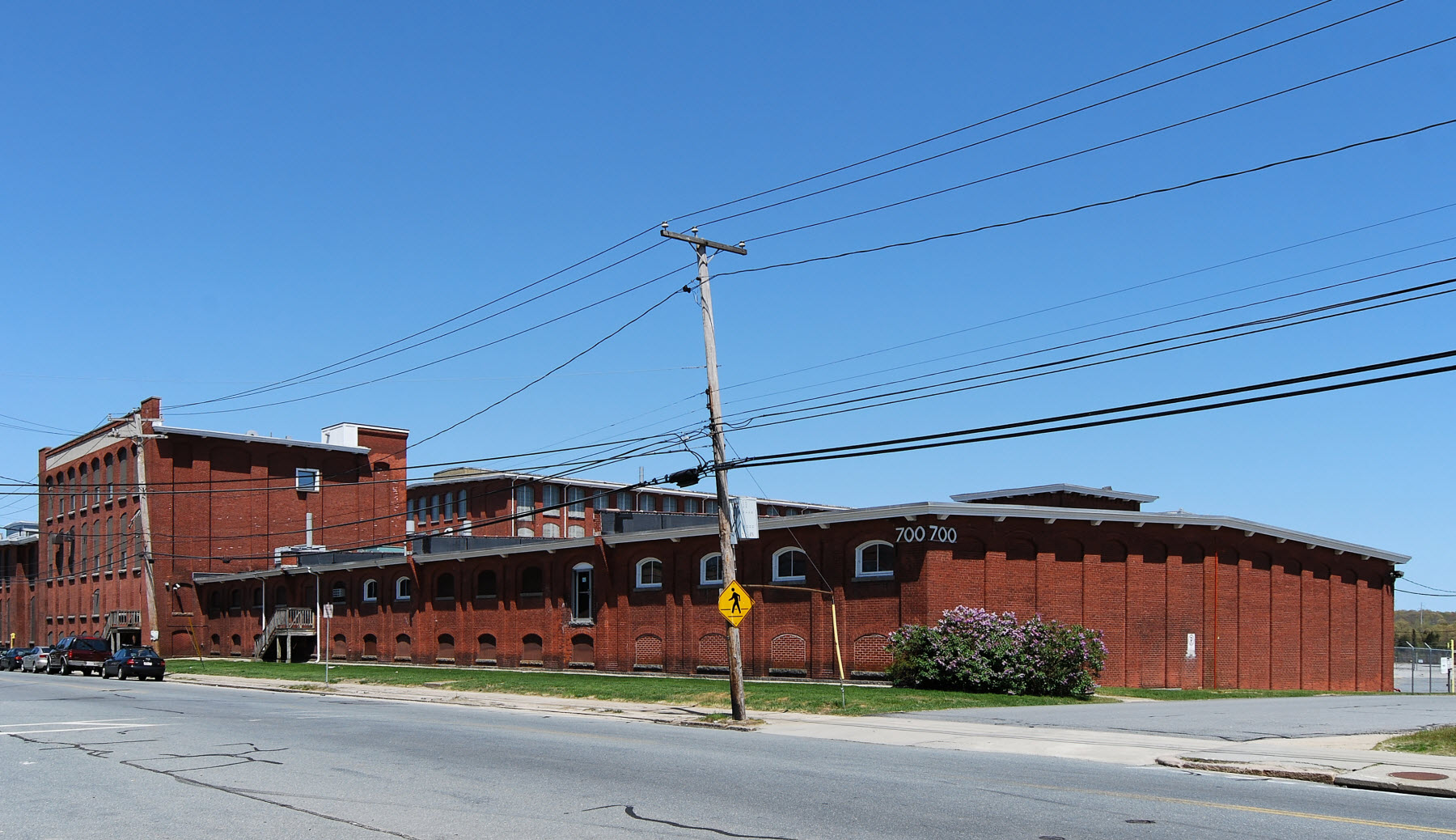
Nonquitt Mill No. 2, New Bedford, 1909.

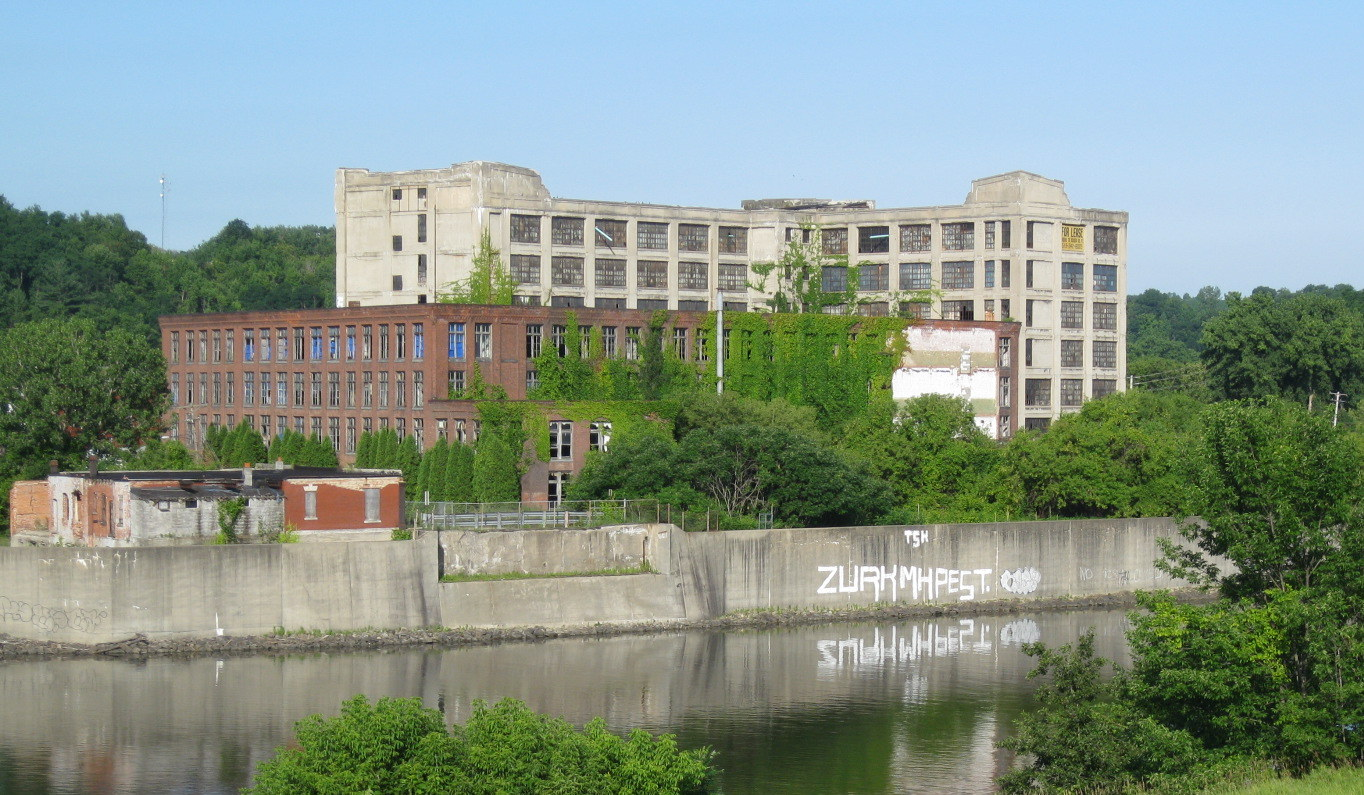
Chalmers Knitting Mills, Amsterdam, 1912 and 1916.
