= Wanskuck, Providence, Rhode Island =

Neighborhood in the northern part of Providence, Rhode Island

Coordinates: 41.8521°N 71.4338°W

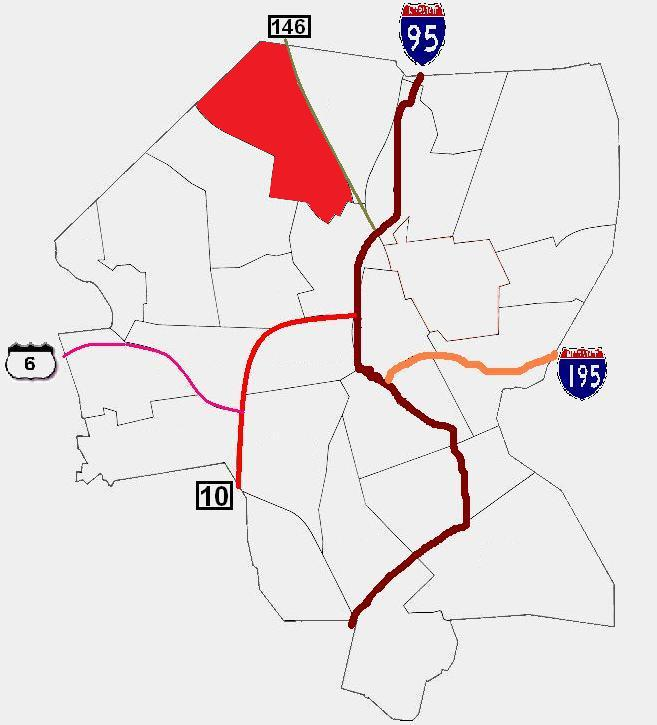
Providence neighborhoods with Wanskuck in red

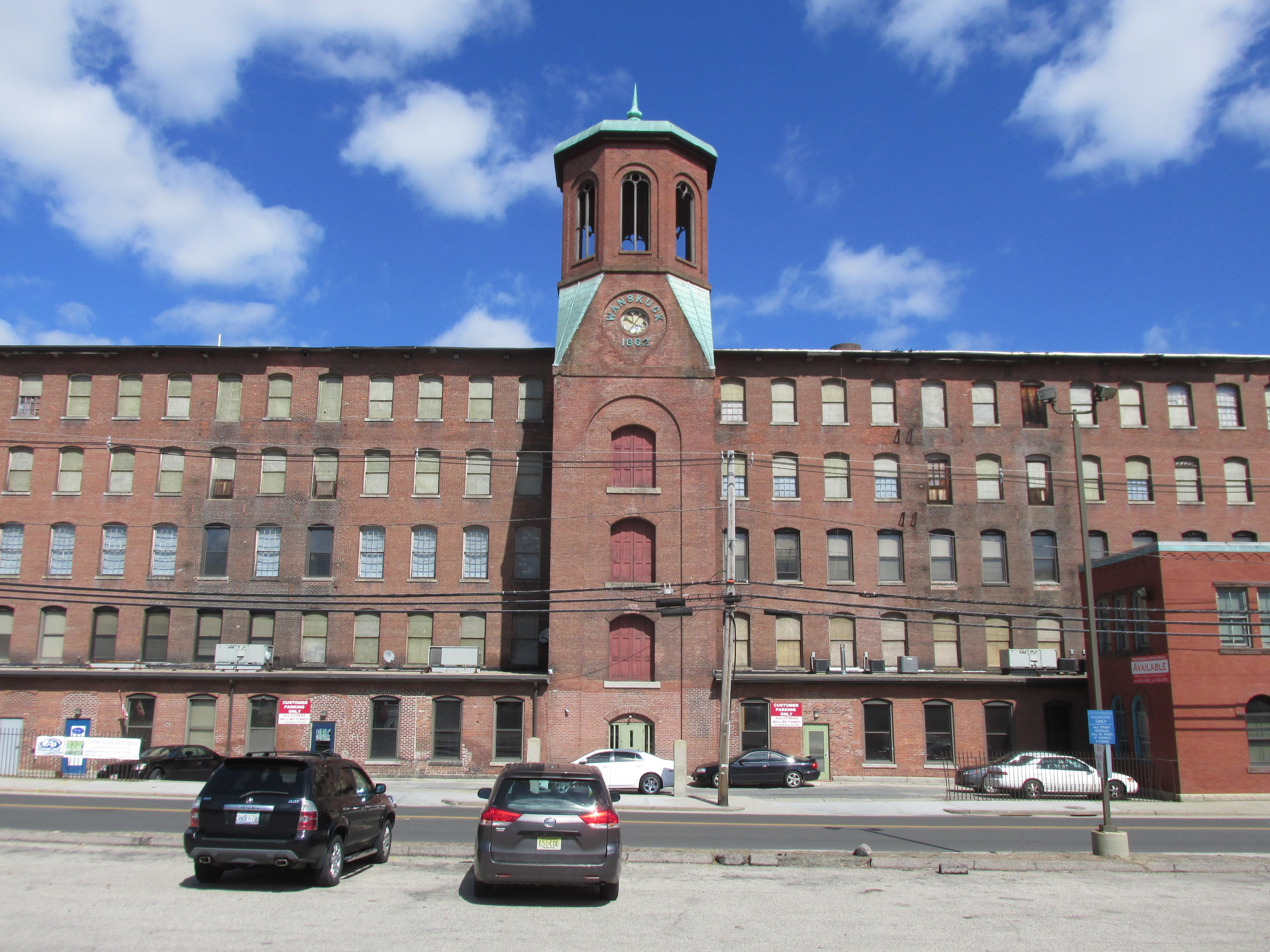
Wanskuck Mills

Wanskuck is a neighborhood in the northern part of Providence, Rhode Island. Along with Charles, it is one of two neighborhoods comprising what is often referred to as the North End. Wanskuck is bounded to the east by Route 146, to the west by Providence College, Admiral Street, Route 7, and Huxley Avenue, and to the south roughly by Fillmore Street. Parts of Wanskuck north of Branch Avenue are the Wanskuck Historic District.

== History ==
The name of the area appears in early city records as Wanscott, Wenscott, or Wenscutt, which are derived from a Narragansett word for “low lands.” The area was annexed to North Providence in 1765, when it was mostly farmland.

Textile mills were built along neighborhood streams in the 19th century, among them the Wanskuck Company. Wanskuck was formed in 1862 by Stephen T. Olney, Jesse Metcalf and Henry J. Steere, and prospered by providing woolen uniforms to soldiers in the American Civil War. In the early 1900s the neighborhood was a polyglot of immigrants, including English, Scottish, Irish, French Canadians, Italians and Germans.

The Wanskuck company closed in the 1950s, after which the neighborhood declined. In 2012, more than 100 homes in the area were reportedly foreclosed and boarded up.

== See also ==
- Wanskuck Historic District
