= Manomet Mills =

- Manomet Mill
- U.S. National Register of Historic Places
- U.S. Historic district
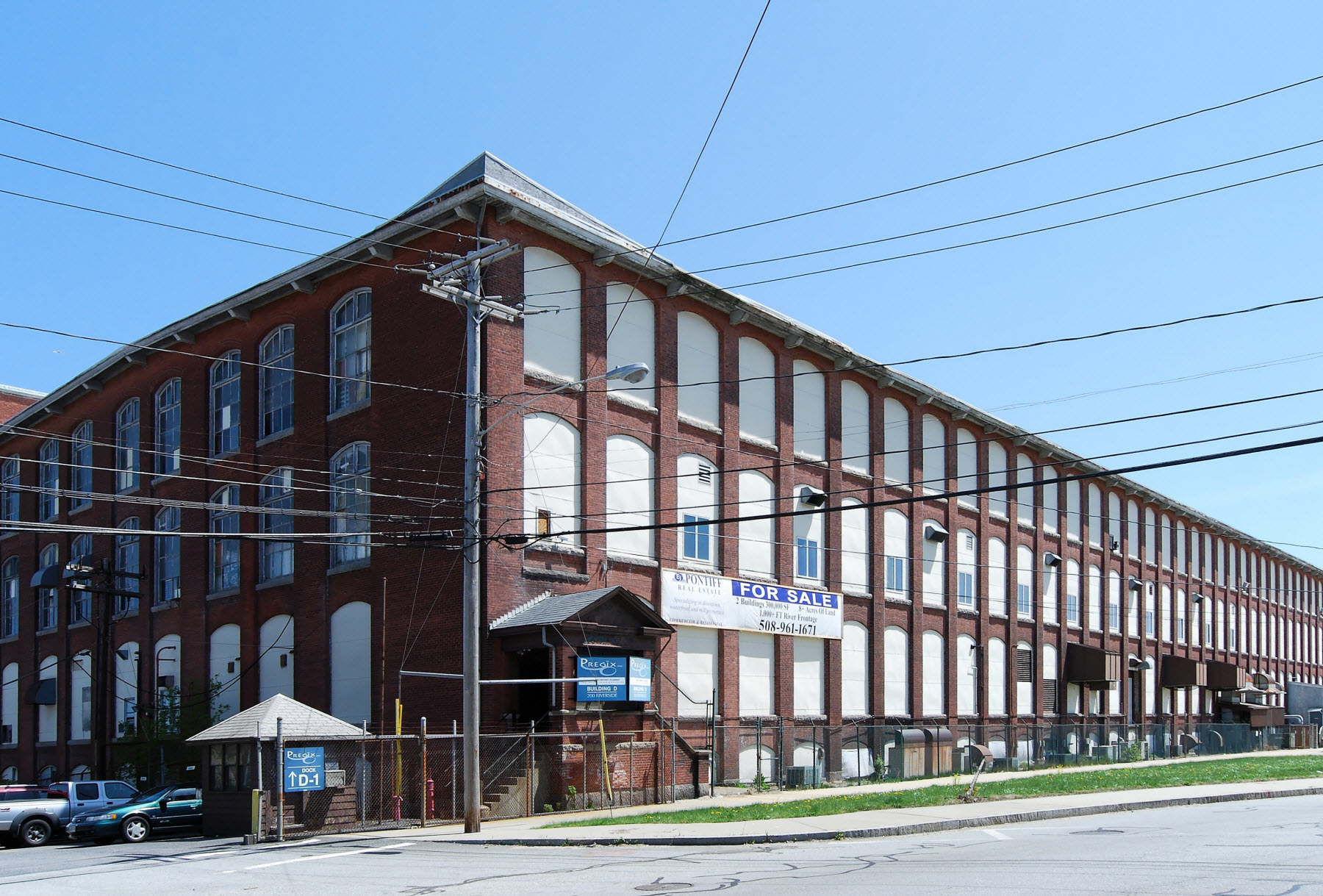

- Location within Massachusetts Location within the United States
- Location: 194–194R, 200 Riverside Ave., New Bedford, Massachusetts
- Coordinates: 41°40′3″N 70°55′12″W
- Area: 11.4 acres (4.6 ha)
- Built: 1903
- Architect: C. R. Makepeace & Company
- NRHP reference No.: 12000304
- Added to NRHP: May 24, 2012

The Manomet Mills are a historic textile mill complex on the north side of New Bedford, Massachusetts, United States. They are located between Riverside Avenue and the Acushnet River, north of Manoment Street and the Whitman Mills. The complex consists of three Classical Revival brick buildings, built between 1903 and 1907. The main building, Mill No. 1, is a 54-bay, three-story structure that was built in 1903. It is attached to Mill No. 2 (1907), of similar size, by a single-story brick structure. The third building is the Mill No. 2 Department Room (1907), a two-story brick building that was originally connected to the other two via overhead bridges, now removed. The mill complex was the main operating site of the Manoment Mill Company, which produced cotton yarn until about 1928. The buildings were sold in that year to the Delaware Rayon Company, which went bankrupt in 1954. Mill No. 2 was then used by the Acushnet Process Company for the manufacture of golf balls, while Mill No. 1 continued to be used for rayon production, a chemically intensive and environmentally hazardous process.

Mills Nos. 1 and 2 were occupied by the Cliftex Corporation. In 2012, projects to redevelop the mills into residences began, with the third redevelopment project finishing in 2022. The mill complex was listed on the National Register of Historic Places, also in 2012.

== Gallery ==
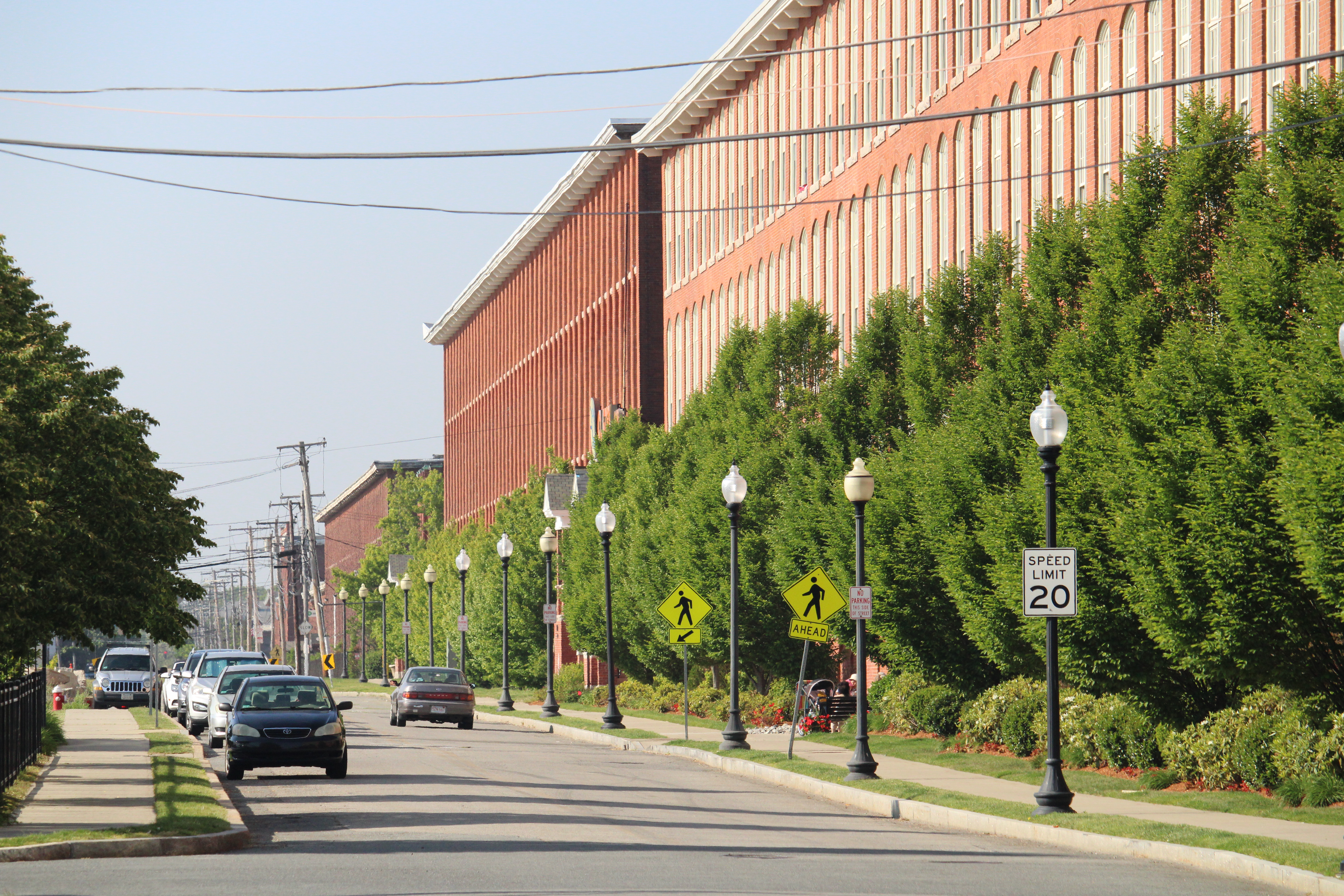
A view of all three mill buildings, looking north on Riverside Avenue. May 2023.

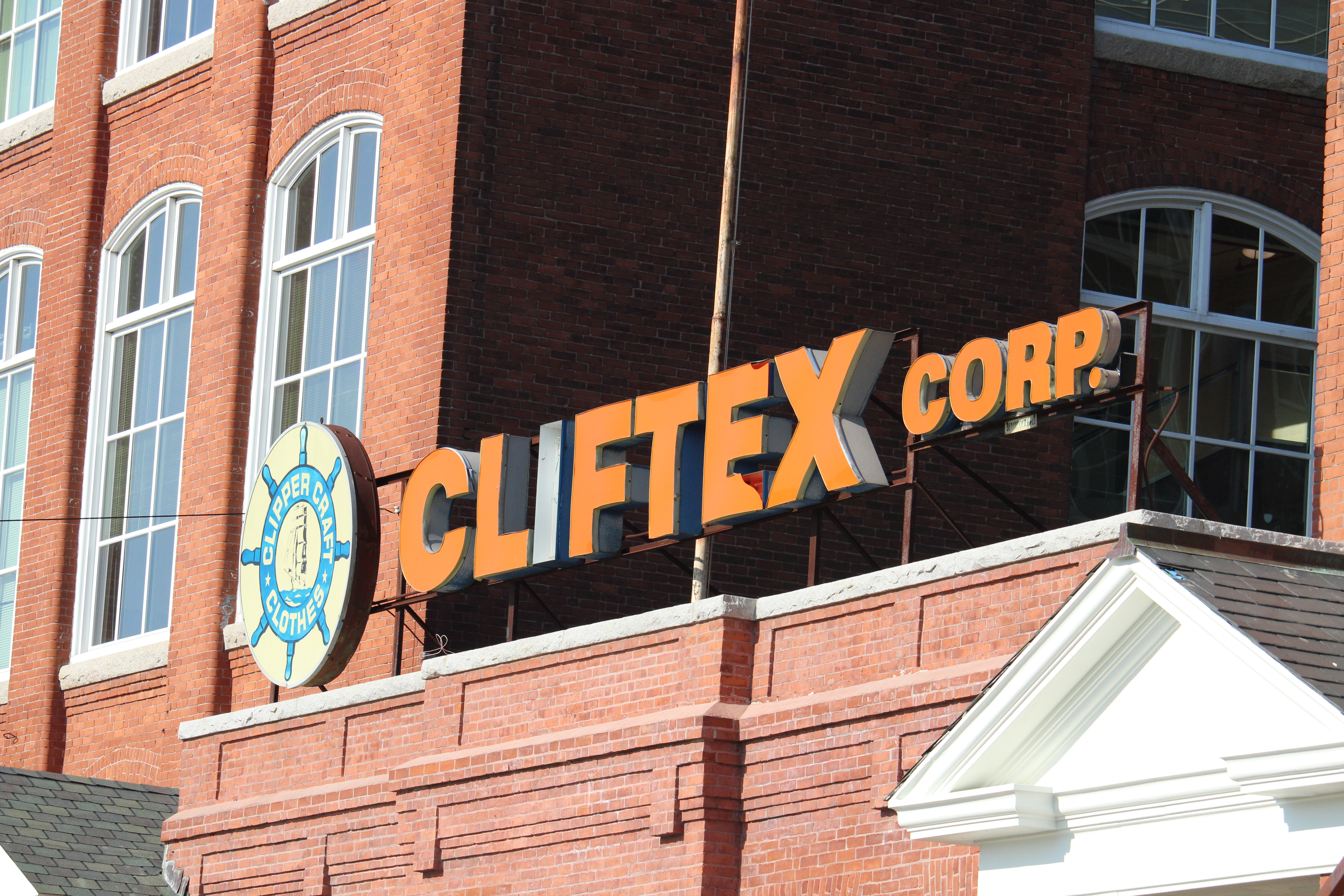
As of May 2023, the Cliftex Corporation's sign still sits atop the northern-most mill building, even after being redeveloped into apartments.

== See also ==
- National Register of Historic Places listings in New Bedford, Massachusetts
- List of mills in New Bedford, Massachusetts
