= Minterburn Mill =

Historic place in Connecticut, United States

- U.S. National Register of Historic Places
- U.S. Historic district
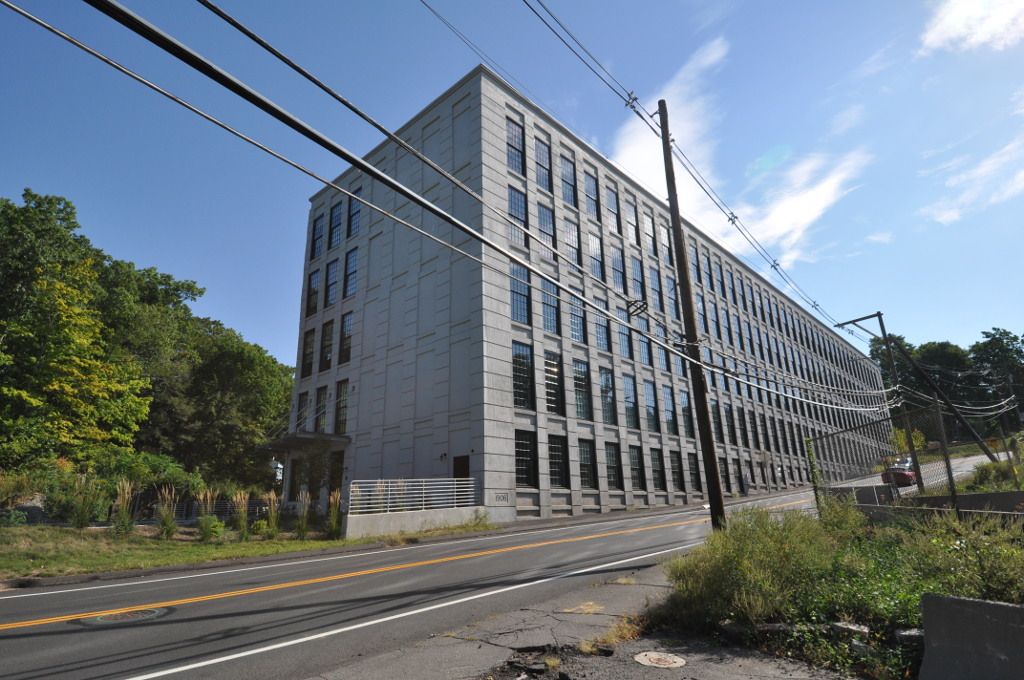
- The 1906 building after a recent renovation to an apartment complex

- Location within Connecticut Location within the United States
- Location: 215 East Main Street, Vernon, Connecticut
- Coordinates: 41°52′4″N 72°25′59″W
- Area: 5.1 acres (2.1 ha)
- Built: 1834 and 1906
- Built by: Frank B. Gilbreth
- Architect: C. R. Makepeace & Co.
- Architectural style: Greek Revival
- NRHP reference No.: 84001171
- Added to NRHP: February 16, 1984

Minterburn Mill is a former textile mill complex located at 215 East Main Street, in the Rockville village of Vernon, Connecticut. Developed beginning in 1834, it was the first place in Rockville to be developed industrially, and the surviving buildings provide a view of evolutionary changes in mill architecture. The mill was listed on the National Register of Historic Places in 1984. It was converted into an apartment complex in 2016 by the state.

== Description and history ==
The Minterburn Mill complex is located in the northeast corner of Vernon, roughly at the point where the Hockanum River, the historic source of the mill's power, enters the town. It is a complex of four buildings and a concrete dam, built between 1834 and 1906. The main building, originally the Rockville Warp Building, is a large stone structure, 3-1/2 stories in height, which was built in 1834, and is a well-preserved Greek Revival structure. Building 2, the Minterburn Mill, is a four-story structure built in 1906 that is one of the earliest uses of reinforced concrete in an industrial setting.

The site's industrial history dates to at least the 18th century, when an iron works and a gin distillery were documented at the site. In the late 18th century George Hall established a fulling mill. Rockville's first textile mill was built downstream in 1821, and its proprietors purchased Hall's water privilege and land in 1834. The Rockville Warp Building dates to this time; the proprietors also built a stone dam, which was later replaced by the present concrete dam. The mill produced cotton warps used for yarn and satinet production in a number of Rockville's mills. In 1906, the plant was purchased by the Minterburn Mills, which built the new dam and Building 2. That company produced woolen and worsted fabrics until it closed in 1952. The plant was then bought by Roosevelt Mills, which produced knitwear at least into the 1970s.

== See also ==
- National Register of Historic Places listings in Tolland County, Connecticut
