= Edenton Cotton Mill Historic District =

Historic district in North Carolina, United States

- U.S. National Register of Historic Places
- U.S. Historic district
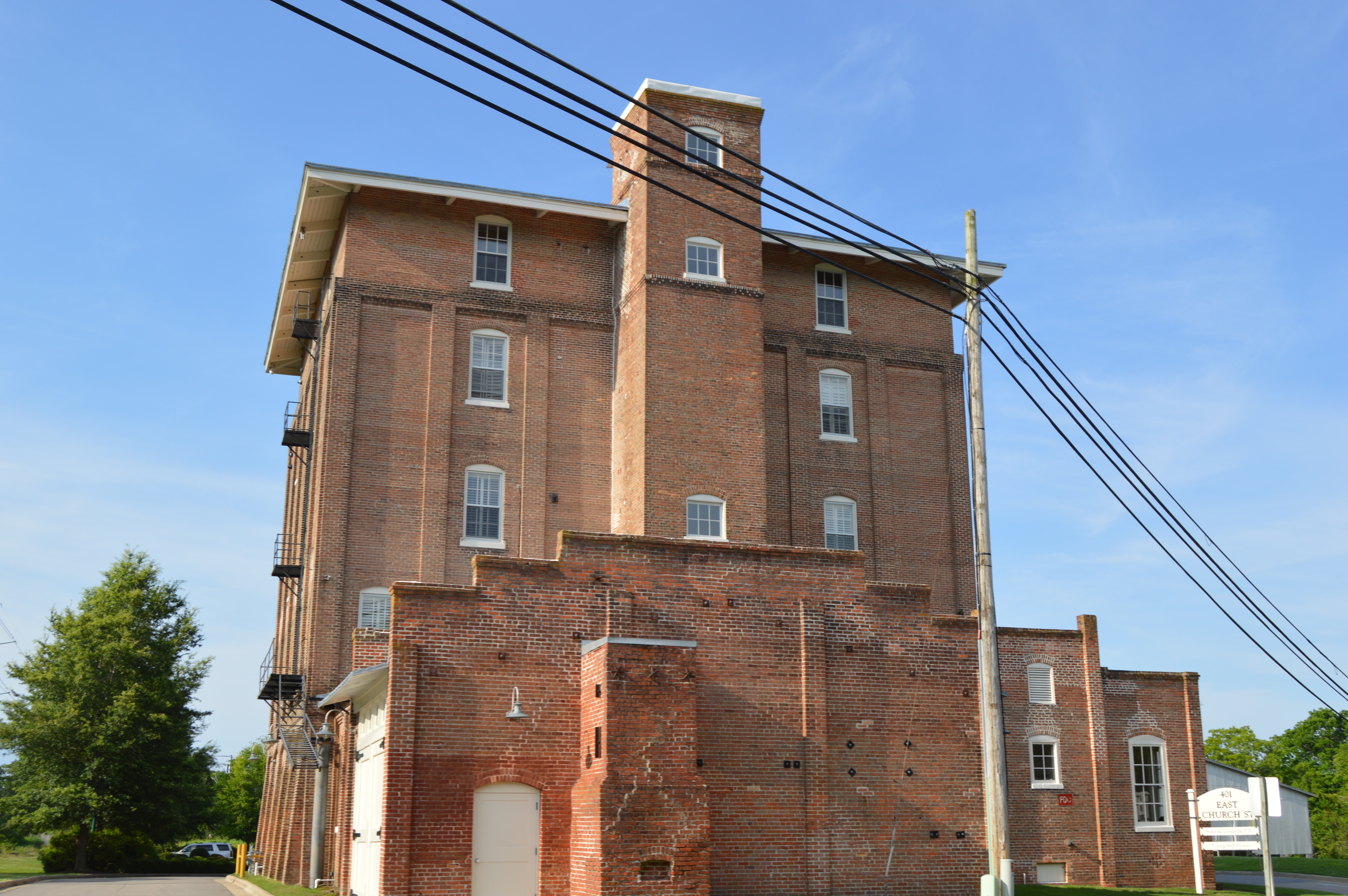
- Front of the cotton mill

- Location within North Carolina Location within the United States
- Location: Bounded by E. Church St., Bount's Creek, Queen Anne's Creek, and Wood Ave., Edenton, North Carolina
- Coordinates: 36°3′27″N 76°36′7″W
- Area: 48.9 acres (19.8 ha)
- Built: 1899-1923
- Built by: George L. Borum
- Architect: C. R. Makepeace & Company
- Architectural style: Bungalow/craftsman, Italianate
- NRHP reference No.: 99000089
- Added to NRHP: February 5, 1999

Edenton Cotton Mill Historic District is a national historic district located at Edenton, Chowan County, North Carolina. The district encompasses 70 contributing buildings, 1 contributing site, 2 contributing structures, and 1 contributing object in a small mill village. It includes industrial and residential buildings developed between 1899 and 1923. Residential buildings are primarily simple one-story, single-pile, frame dwellings and some examples of the Bungalow / American Craftsman style. Notable non-residential buildings include the Italianate Revival style Edenton Cotton Mill (1899-1916), Edenton Cotton Mill Office, and First Christian Church (1916).

It was listed on the National Register of Historic Places in 1999.
