= Oriental Mills =

- U.S. National Register of Historic Places
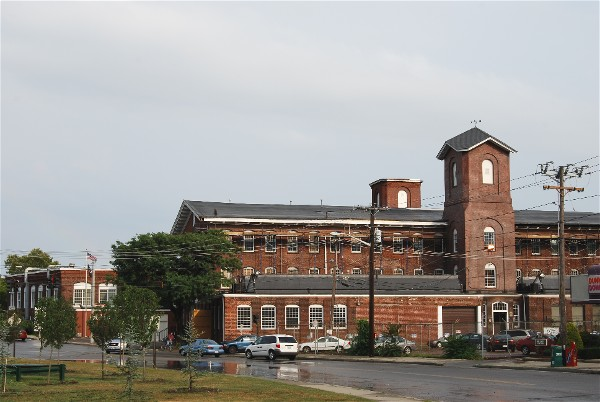

- Location within Rhode Island Location within the United States
- Location: Providence, Rhode Island
- Coordinates: 41°50′23″N 71°25′10″W
- Area: 3.34 acres (1.35 ha)
- Built: 1860; 1912
- Architect: Niles B. Schubarth, C. R. Makepeace & Company
- NRHP reference No.: 05001463
- Added to NRHP: December 23, 2005

The Oriental Mills are a historic textile mill complex at 10 Admiral Street in Providence, Rhode Island. The site consists of seven buildings, constructed between about 1860 and 1917, by a variety of textile manufacturers that operated on the site. The oldest building, from c. 1860, was built by the Oriental Mills Manufacturing Company soon after its founding. It is a large three-story brick structure, presenting eight bays to Admiral Street and thirty to Whipple Street. It has a well-defined Italianate roof line with brackets. Building 3, which lies southeast of Building 1 and fronts on Oriental Street, is from the same time period and exhibits similar styling. Originally used for the manufacture of cotton textiles, the complex was purchased in 1918 by the American Silk Spinning Company, which pioneered the blending of nylon fibers into its products here.

The complex was listed on the National Register of Historic Places in 2005.

== See also ==
- National Register of Historic Places listings in Providence, Rhode Island
