= Whitman Mills =

- U.S. National Register of Historic Places
- U.S. Historic district
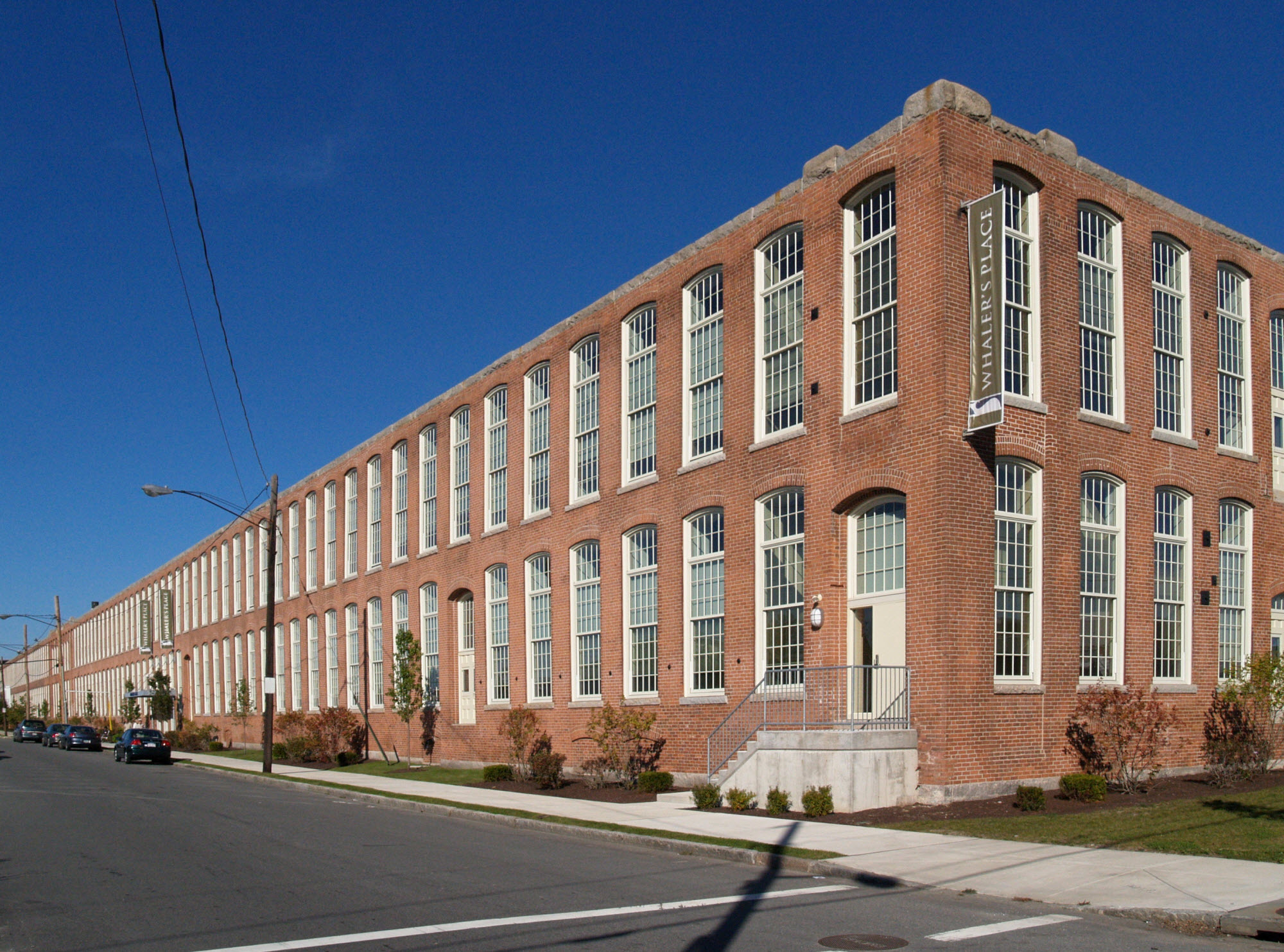

- Location within Massachusetts Location within the United States
- Location: New Bedford, Massachusetts
- Coordinates: 41°39′45″N 70°55′10″W
- Area: 15.88 acres (6.43 ha)
- Built: 1896
- Architect: C. R. Makepeace & Company
- NRHP reference No.: 03000844
- Added to NRHP: August 29, 2003

The Whitman Mills are a historic mill complex on the banks of the Acushnet River north of central New Bedford, Massachusetts. The mill yard is bounded by Riverside Street, Manomnet Street, Coffin Street, and the river. It is just one of a group of mill complexes developed by William Whitman in the area around the turn of the 20th century. This particular grouping, including two large mills, an office, and several outbuildings, was built between 1896 and 1917, with most of those original buildings still standing. The mills operated until 1932, when the Whitman Company went bankrupt. The complex was nearly demolished in the 1950s, but has since been subdivided and occupied by a succession of smaller businesses.

Renovations at the historic Victoria Riverside mill are now complete and tenants began occupying units in the winter of 2011. Because of the 18’ ceilings, the architect has created a unique design with living space on two floors within the unit with a balcony on the second floor overlooking open space on the first floor. Traditional loft units are also available with living space on one floor. Of the 101 units, traditional loft units are also available with living space on one floor. New Bedford has teamed with Community Rowing of Boston to bring rowing to the Acushnet River. The plan is to create a top level rowing course on the river with amenities such as a boathouse, launch deck and observation areas. Victoria Riverside will overlook the course.

The mill complex was listed on the National Register of Historic Places in 2003.

== See also ==
- Wamsutta Mills
- List of mills in New Bedford, Massachusetts
- National Register of Historic Places listings in New Bedford, Massachusetts
