= Chalmers Knitting Mills =

Historic factory in New York, United States

- U.S. National Register of Historic Places
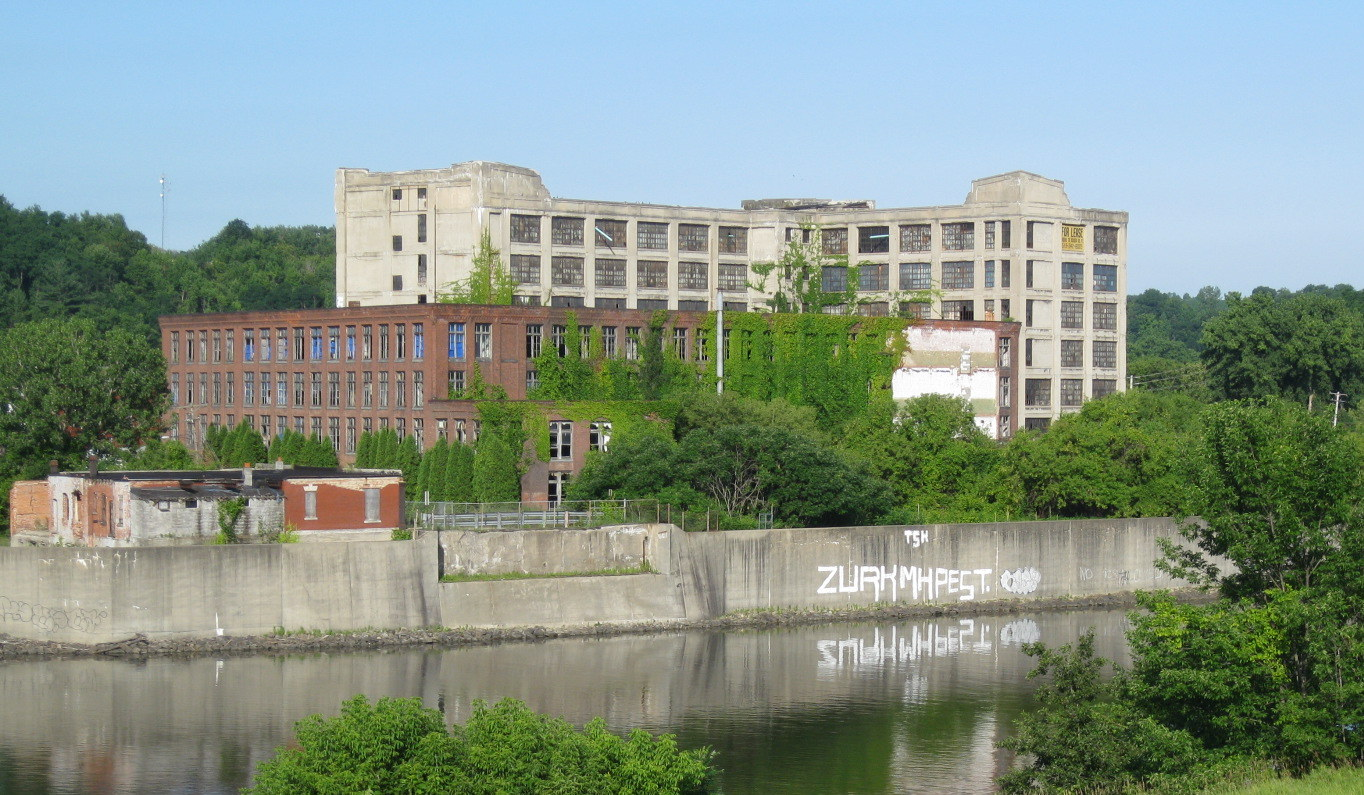
- Chalmers Knitting Mills, July 2009

- Location within New York Location within the United States
- Location: 21-41 Bridge St., Amsterdam, New York
- Coordinates: 42°56′07″N 74°11′47″W
- Area: 2.5 acres (1.0 ha)
- Built: 1918
- Architect: C. R. Makepeace & Co.
- NRHP reference No.: 10000028
- Added to NRHP: February 22, 2010

Chalmers Knitting Mills was a historic factory building located at Amsterdam, Montgomery County, New York. It was built in 1913 and expanded in 1916.

The original section was a four-story, brick building. The 1916 addition was a seven-story, steel frame and reinforced concrete building with concrete block. The addition was set at a near-right angle to the original section, giving the building an L-shaped footprint. The mill produced undergarments and remained in operation under the Chalmers name until the founders' death in 1959.

It was added to the National Register of Historic Places in 2010.

The city of Amsterdam was awarded a $1.4 million Restore New York state grant to demolish the factory, which was razed in 2011. The state Department of Environmental Conservation provided $1.9 million to clean up the contamination.
