= Lowe Mill =

- Lowe Mill and Mill Village Historic District
- U.S. National Register of Historic Places
- U.S. Historic district
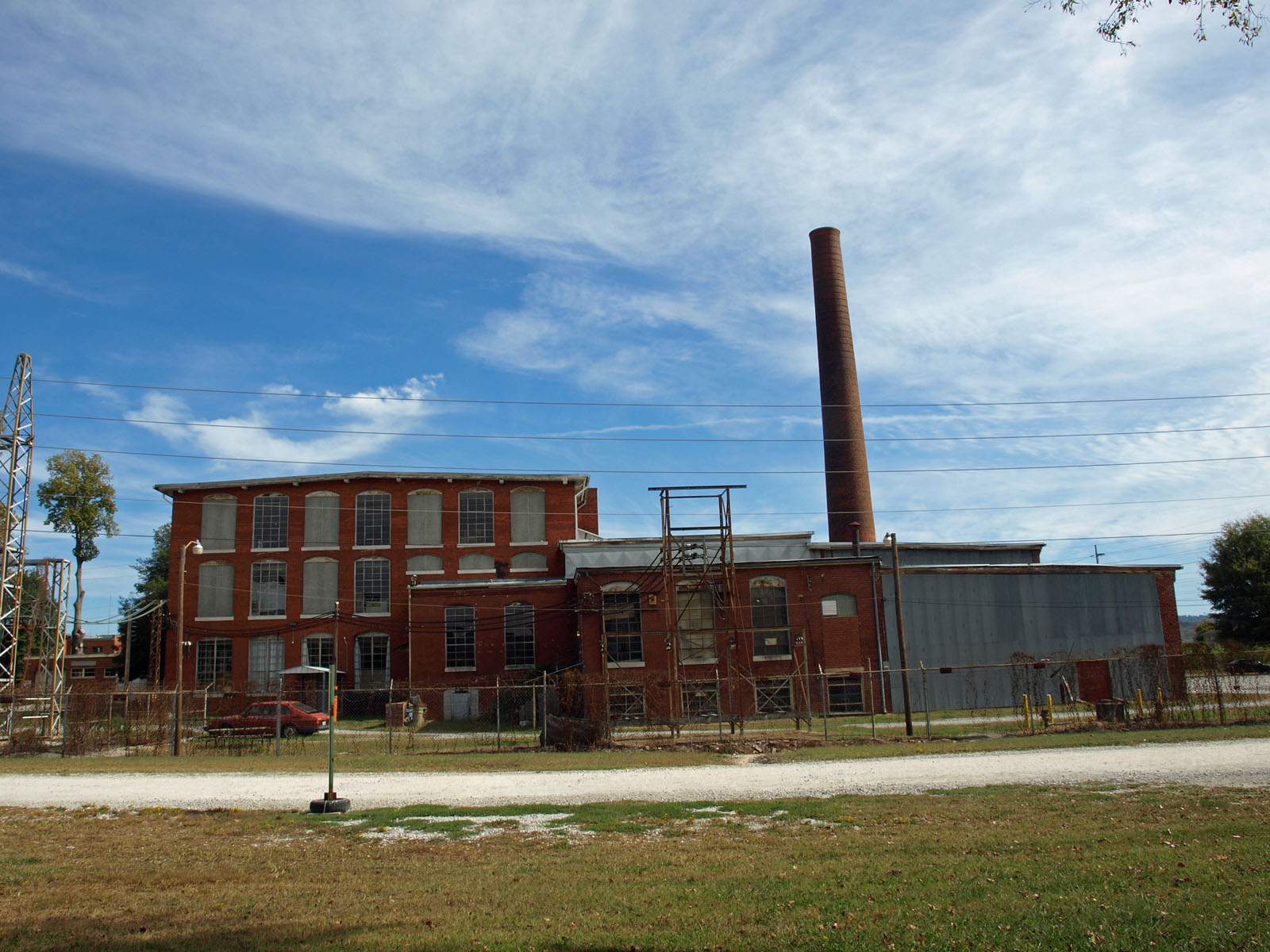
- Lowe Mill in October 2011

- Location within Huntsville, Alabama Location within Alabama Location within the United States
- Location: Triana Blvd. SW., 10th Ave. SW., Summer St. & Governor's Dr., Huntsville, Alabama
- Coordinates: 34°43′2″N 86°36′11″W
- Built: 1900
- Architect: C. R. Makepeace & Co.
- Architectural style: Industrial Vernacular
- NRHP reference No.: 11000375
- Added to NRHP: June 24, 2011

Lowe Mill is a former cotton mill of size approximately 171,000 sq ft (15,900 m^{2}) located southwest of downtown Huntsville, Alabama.

Today, the building is operated by Lowe Mill ARTS & Entertainment and is the largest privately owned arts facility in the United States. Lowe Mill A&E consists of 153 studio spaces, is currently home to two hundred artists, and serves as a gallery and performance venue.

== History ==
In 1900, Arthur H. Lowe of Fitchburg, Massachusetts, formed Lowe Manufacturing Company, and began the building of Huntsville's fifth textile mill. Lowe Mill opened in 1901 with 25,000 spindles that helped to turn locally-grown cotton into woven cloth. In 1902, Eastern Manufacturing Company built the final large mill in Huntsville, a weaving mill across from Lowe Mill. Lowe Mill and Eastern Manufacturing merged their companies and the two buildings in 1904. The spinning mill supplied yarns for the weaving mills, where the highest grade ginghams and shirtings were made to supply large clothing manufacturers throughout the nation.

In December 1932, Lowe Manufacturing declared bankruptcy, and the factory started back up again under Lowe Mills, Inc. in January 1933, with Donald Comer, head of Birmingham's Avondale Mills, as majority stockholder. In 1936, Lowe Mill changed hands again when Edwin Greene of New York became the majority stockholder of the renamed Lowe Corporation. In March 1937, Lowe Corporation was dissolved and the plant was sold to Walter Laxson and became a cotton warehouse.

At the end of World War II, in December 1945, Nashville-based General Shoe Co. opened a shoe factory in Lowe Mill, employing up to 800 people. In 1959, General Shoe Co. became Genesco, Inc. Many US soldiers in Vietnam wore boots made at Genesco's Huntsville factory. In 1978, Genesco sold it and Martin Industries turned Lowe Mill into a warehouse for residential and commercial heating systems. In 1999, realtor Gene McLain bought Lowe Mill and then in 2001, sold it to Research Genetics founder, Jim Hudson, who is the current owner of Lowe Mill.

The mill currently houses Lowe Mill ARTS & Entertainment, which provides art studio and exhibition space for over 200 artists. The mill and surrounding neighborhood were added to the National Register of Historic Places in 2011.
