= List of mills in New Bedford, Massachusetts =

The city of New Bedford, Massachusetts once had about 70 textile mills, operated by 28 establishments with over 3.7 million spindles at its peak around 1920, and was among the leading cotton textile centers in the United States during the early 20th century. There are currently about 18 mills left in the city.

== Existing mills ==
Ref#	Name	# Mills	Image	Built	Location	Spindles	Looms	Notes/current use
1	Booth Manufacturing Company	2		1910	East Rodney French Ave	50,000	1,300	
2	Butler Mills	2		1902	Ruth Street	95,000	2,100	Abandoned to the City in 1935 for back taxes; Mill No 1 razed
3	Dartmouth Manufacturing Company	3		1895	Cove Street	200,000	5,700	one mill demolished
4	Grinnell Manufacturing Company	1		1882	Kilburn Street	126,000	3,135	Part of property sold to Revere Copper and Brass Co.
5	Hathaway Manufacturing Company	4		1888	46-92 Harbor St	108,000	3,400	Later part of Berkshire-Hathaway
6	Holmes Manufacturing Company	1		1909	East Rodney French Ave	69,500		Sold to Kendall Corporation in 1934;
7	Howland Mill	2		1888	Orchard Street	82,000	3,250	Mill No. 2 built in 1892, reincorporated as Gosnold Mills Company in 1902
8	Kilburn Mills	2		1904	Rodney French Boulevard	126,000		Enlarged in 1915; as of 2015, rented out to various private businesses such as an antique store, a used record store, a vintage clothing shop, and artists' studios/galleries.
9	Lambeth Rope Company	1			Tarkiln Hill Road			
10	Manomet Mills	4		1903	Riverside Avenue	203,020		Mill No. 2 added 1908. Mills No. 1 and 2 sold to Delaware Rayon Company in 1928; Mill No. 3 added 1916, sold to Nashawena in 1925; Mill No. 4 added in 1922, located on King Street, was the largest spinning mill in the world. It never operated at full capacity and was sold to Firestone Rubber Co. in 1927
11	Nashawena Mills	2		1909	Belleville Avenue	145,000	3,324	Additions built in 1916 and 1922; plant's weave shed the largest in the world
12	National Spun Silk Company	1			Brook Street			
13	Neild Manufacturing Corp.	2		1910	Nash Road	62,600	1,600	Weave shed added in 1925
14	Nonquitt Spinning Company	3		1906	Belleville Avenue	150,000		
15	Pierce Brothers LTD.	2		1909	Sawyer Street	50,000	1,200	
16	Taber Mill, Inc.	2		1906		70,720		
17	Wamsutta Mills	7		1846	Acushnet Ave	229,000	4,310	Expanded in 1855, 1865, and 1870; Mills No. 1, 2 and 3 have been razed; Mills 4 and 5 converted into apartments; Mills 6 and 7 and weave shed contain various tenants
18	Whitman Mills	3		1895	Coffin Ave	175,088	4,932	Weave shed demolished in 1934; converted into apartments

== Non-extant mills ==
Ref#	Name	# Mills	Image	Built	Destroyed	Location	Spindles	Looms	Notes
1	Acushnet Mill Corp.	2		1883	1931	Dalano St	105,000	3,500	Second mill built in 1887; demolished in 1931
2	Anderson Textile MFG Co.	1		1909			2,400		Company dissolved in 1911
3	Beacon Manufacturing Co.	1		1896		Purchase St			
4	Bennett Manufacturing Corp.	2		1891		Coggeshall St	12,000	1,000	Two mills; became part of New England Cotton Yarn Company in 1899; later part of Fairhaven Mills in 1917
5	Bristol Manufacturing Co.	2		1893	1933	198 Coggeshall St	67,000		Demolished in 1933
6	City Manufacturing Corp.	2		1888		Grinnell St	58,000		
7	Columbia Spinning Co.	2		1892	2009	Coggeshall St	80,000		Two mills; became part of New England Cotton Yarn Company in 1899; later part of Fairhaven Mills in 1917; Demolished in 2009 to make way for a shopping plaza.
8	New Bedford Cordage Co.	1				Ash / Emerson			
9	New Bedford Cotton Mills Corp.	2		1909		Coffin / Church Street	80,000		
10	New England Cotton Yarn Co.	1				Coggeshall St			Additional mill built after 1899 as part of former Bennett-Columbia complex acquisition. Sold to Fairhaven Mills in 1917
11	New Bedford Manufacturing Co.	2		1882		North / Water	40,000		Reorganized as New Bedford Spinning Co. in 1897; became part of New England Cotton Yarn Co. in 1899; Sold to Passaic Cotton Mills in 1917; later American Cotton Fabric Corporation;
12	New Bedford Steam Co.	1		1846		Hillman Street	7,500		First textile mill in New Bedford. Not successful. Closed in 1852.
13	Page Manufacturing Co.	2		1906		Orchard / Cove	64,000	1,740	
14	Pierce Manufacturing Corp.	2		1892		Belleville Ave	64,470	3,600	
15	Potomska Mills	2		1873	1935	Potomska St	123,500	3,018	Second mill added in 1877; demolished in 1935
16	Quissett Mill	1		1912		Prospect St	80,000		
17	Rotch Mills	2		1892		Orchard Street	100,000		Became part of New England Cotton Yarns in 1899; Sold to Passaic Cotton Mills in 1916 which constructed addition known as Penrod Mill with 30,000 spindles; plant sold to Goodyear and Fisk Rubber Companies in 1924.
18	Sharp Manufacturing Co.	2		1910	1937	Dartmouth St	200,000	1,000	Mill No. 2 completed in 1917; Purchased by Rockdale Mills, Inc. in 1937 and razed. Warehouse remains.
19	Soule Mill	2		1901		Sawyer St	92,640	2,300	

== See also ==
- List of mills in Fall River, Massachusetts
- List of mills in Holyoke, Massachusetts
- List of mills in Oldham
