= Aragon Mill =

Coordinates: 34°2′57″N 85°03′20″W

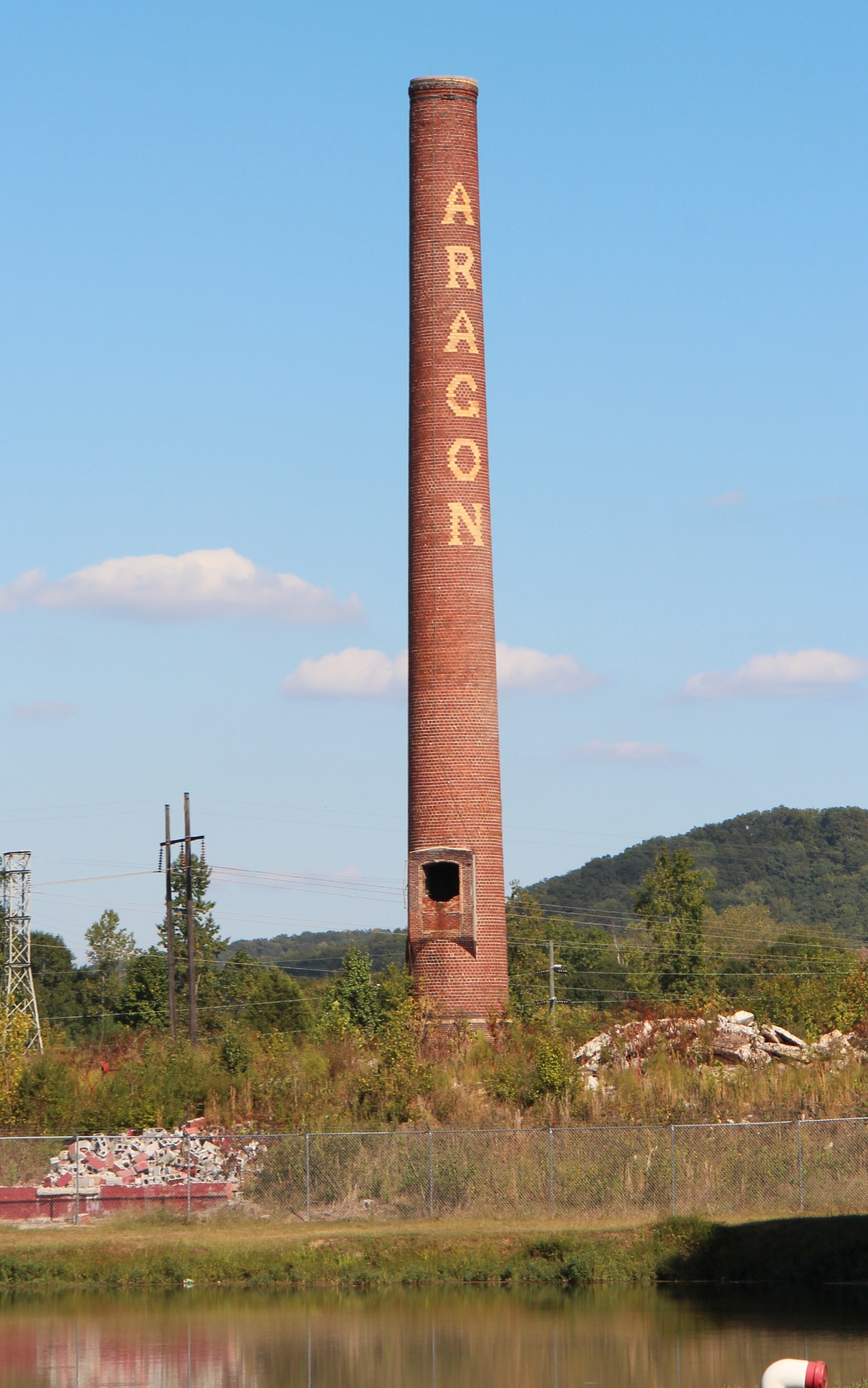
- Aragon Mill's chimney, October 2016
- Founded: 1898
- Founder: Walcott and Campbell
- Headquarters: Aragon, Georgia

The Aragon Mill was a mill in Aragon, Georgia, United States, built in 1898 by Walcott and Campbell of New York Mills, New York. In 1900, the mill was purchased by A. D. Juilliard Co., Inc., which made many additions over the years. A one-story section was built in 1900 that housed six pairs of spinning mules In 1904, the second floor over the mule spinning was built and 56 duck C&K looms were added, while the mule spinners were removed and twisters installed. In 1939, a shop addition was built. In 1940, the spinning room was added and the 60” Draper addition was built, also drapery looms were moved from both New York Mills and Brookford. In the 1930s, it became a United Merchants Mill. The plant continued operation until shutting down in 1970. In 1972 Integrated Products bought the plant and operated it until 1989. At that time, the plant was acquired in a leveraged buyout by David Bridges but retained its name. The plant closed its doors on March 31, 1990. In October 1990, Diamond Rug and Carpet, a Dalton Company, purchased the plant and operated it until 1994. The plant remained empty until 1998 when brothers Brian and Kirk Spears purchased the mill and used it in the production of pillows and wooden pallets until August 6, 2002, when fire destroyed the complex.

In the early 1970s, Si Kahn, an activist and celebrated musician in bluegrass and folk music circles, wrote a song lamenting the loss of mill village culture. The song was re-titled 'Belfast Mill' and recorded by The Fureys, with very minor alterations on their 1982 album When You Were Sweet Sixteen.

Aragon, Georgia became a city due to the community growing around the mill.
