= Wamsutta Mills =

Textile manufacturing company

- U.S. National Register of Historic Places
- U.S. Historic district
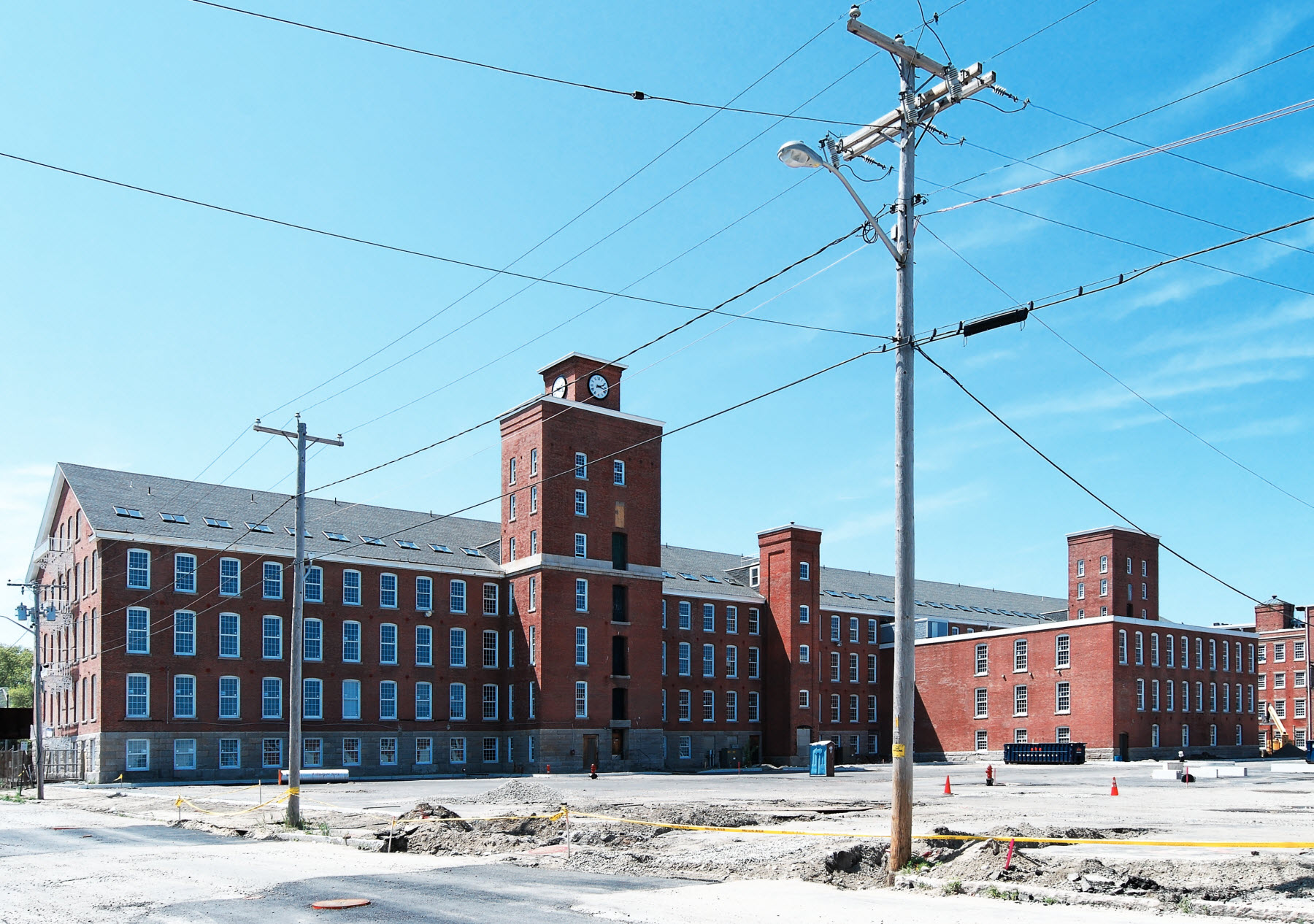

- Location within Massachusetts Location within the United States
- Location: Acushnet Ave., Logan, Wamsutta and N. Front St., New Bedford, Massachusetts
- Coordinates: 41.65°N 70.92563°W
- Area: 19.3 acres (7.8 ha)
- Built: 1847
- Architect: Thomas Bennett Jr, Edward Kilburn
- Architectural style: Utilitarian industrial
- NRHP reference No.: 08000794
- Added to NRHP: August 19, 2008

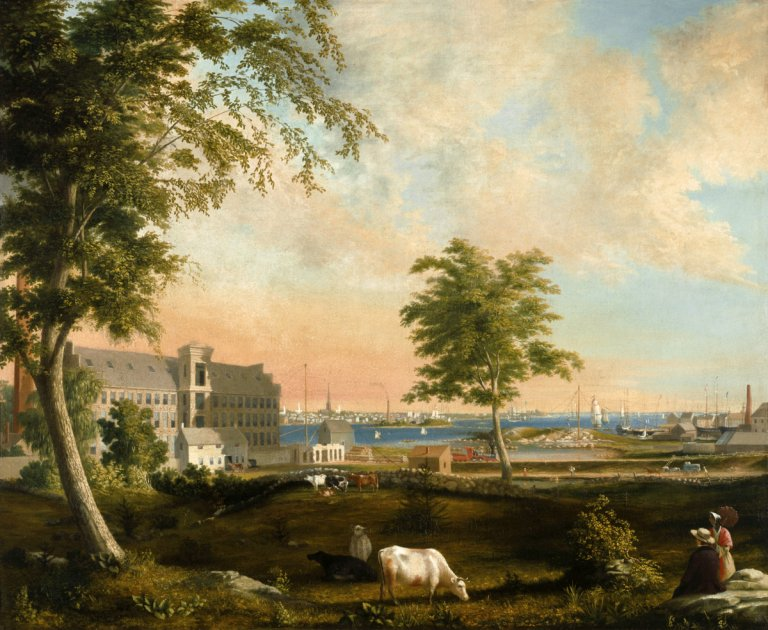
Wamsutta Mills circa 1850 by William Allen Wall

Wamsutta Mills is a former textile manufacturing company and current brand offering sheets, towels, bedding and other household products. Founded by Thomas Bennett, Jr. on the banks of the Acushnet River in New Bedford, Massachusetts in 1846 and opened in 1848, Wamsutta Mills was named after Wamsutta, the son of a Native American chief who negotiated an early alliance with the English settlers of the Plymouth Colony. It was the first of many textile mills in New Bedford, and gradually led to cotton textile manufacturing overtaking whaling as the town's principal industry by the 1870s.

Wamsutta Mills became well known for producing fine quality shirtings, sheetings and other fine cotton products. The Wamsutta name continues to be used as a brand today, formerly marketed by American retailer Bed Bath & Beyond in North America and Brazilian textile conglomerate Springs Global in South America. Following Bed Bath & Beyond's bankruptcy in 2023, the brand assets were acquired by Indo Count Global, with plans to relaunch in 2025 selling direct to consumers online.

== History ==
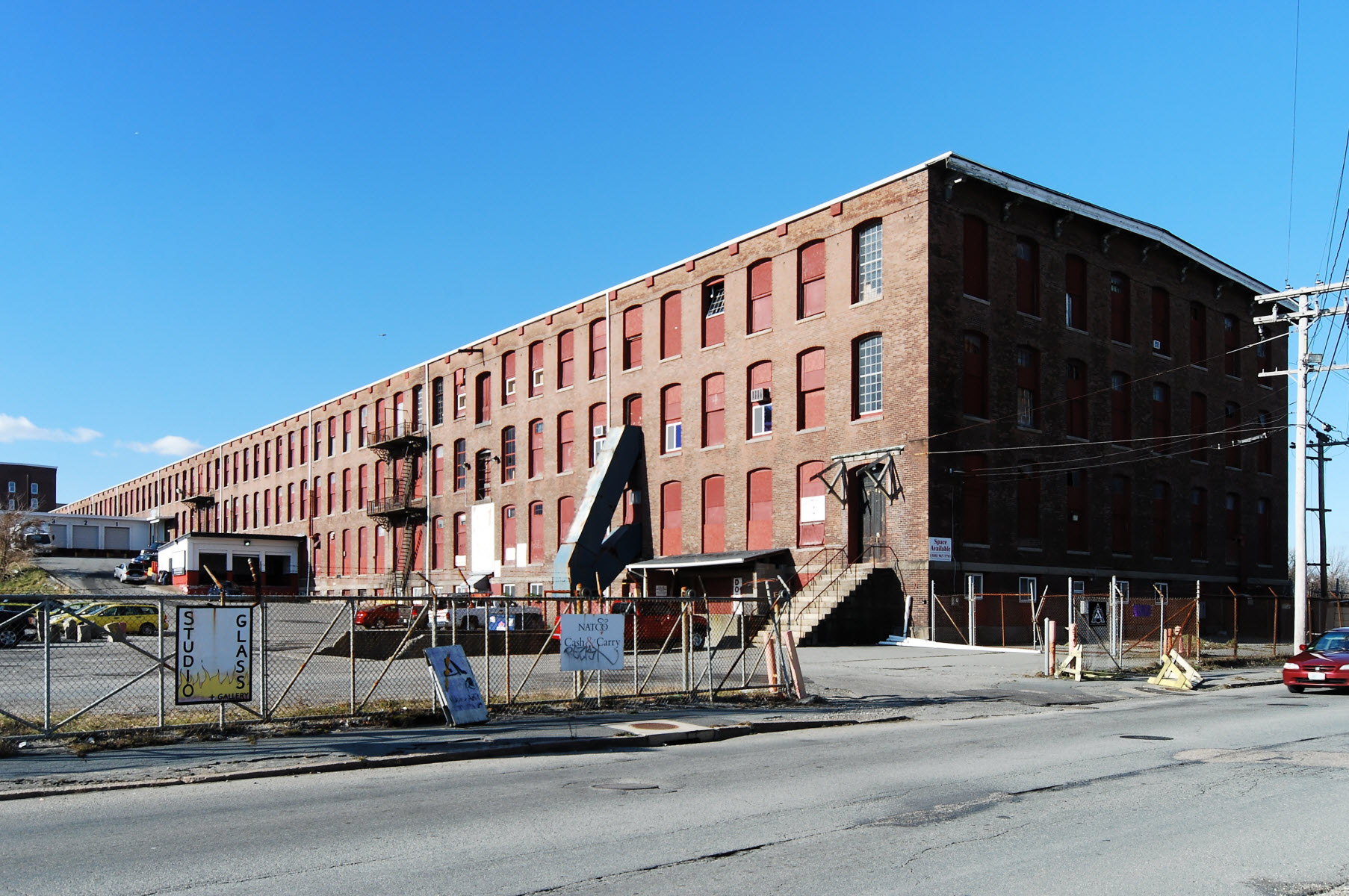
Wamsutta Mill No. 6

=== Planning and raising funds ===
The Wamsutta Mills were conceived by Thomas Bennett Jr. of nearby Fairhaven, Massachusetts. Bennett originally planned to locate the mill in Georgia, where he had previously worked for fellow Fairhaven native Dwight Perry, in a mill. However, one prominent investor, Congressman Joseph Grinnell stipulated that the mill be located in his home city, New Bedford.

On April 8, 1846, the new corporation was granted a charter from the Massachusetts General Court. By mid-1847, Bennett raised $160,000 for the mill, mostly in small investments of ten shares or less from skeptical New Bedford businessmen who were unfamiliar with the textile industry. The first meeting of the stockholders was held in 1847 and Joseph Grinnell was elected president and Thomas Bennett Jr., who had served as the superintendent of the Wamsutta Mills from 1846 until 1874, the secretary.

=== Early development ===
Construction of the first mill began in 1847. Designed by Seth Ingalls of New Bedford, it was a stone structure, 212 feet (65 m) long by 70 feet (21 m) wide, with five stories. David Whitman of Rhode Island served as an advisor during the construction and setup of the mill, which was initially fitted with 10,000 spindles, with room for 5,000 more. Cloth production began in February 1849, and housing was built for its workers. Soon business began to boom, with capital increasing to $300,000 in 1853. A second four-story mill, 240 feet (73 m) long by 70 feet (21 m) wide, was built in 1855. A third mill, a duplicate of the second, was built in 1860–1861 outfitted in 1862 and opened in 1865; the delay was due to the Civil War and labor and product shortages. By 1868 the capitalization of the company jumped to $2,000,000 and a fourth bigger mill was built. Mill No. 4 was constructed in brick, 495 feet (151 m) long by 70 feet (21 m) wide with four stories.

=== Further development ===
Thomas Bennett Jr. retired as superintendent in 1874 and was replaced by Edward Kilburn, though the company continued to grow. By 1875, capital reached $2,500,000, and Australia had recently been added as a shipping destination. Mill 5 was added north of Mill No. 4. Also of brick construction, it is 433 feet (132 m) long by 93 feet (28 m) wide. Shortly after, and production of percale fabric began (New Bedford is known to be the first city in the United States to make fine cotton). Famous textile magnate William Madison Wood began his textile career at the Wamsutta Mills, age fifteen, working there 1873-1876. In 1880, the Wamsutta Mills replaced the old Whitin spindles with 20,000 new Rabeth spindles, which were made in Pawtucket, Rhode Island by the Fales and Jenks Machine Company. In 1882 the construction of mill number 6 was begun. It is also of brick, three stories high and 569 feet (173 m) long by 95 feet (29 m) wide.

=== Economic success ===
In 1883, the Wamsutta Mills had six mills and produced 26 million yards of cotton cloth annually. Joseph Grinnell remained on until 1885 when he died at the age of 96; and Andrew G. Pierce, William Wallace Crapo, Oliver Prescott, and Charles F. Broughton successively took his place. Soon after, in 1892, Wamsutta owned a total of seven mills, and was the largest cotton weaving plant in the world. By 1897 Wamsutta was operating 4,450 looms and employing 2,100 workers.

In 1917 plans were in the works for this massive mill to receive a modernization overhaul. Machinery was upgraded and replaced and the steam power was replaced with electric. A new focus was directed toward fine sheets and pillowcases complete with advertising campaign geared towards the public. By this time, the company operated a total of 229,000 spindles and 4,310 looms, in a city with numerous large spinning and weaving mills.

Prior to the Great Depression, in the 1920s, the city of New Bedford, along with many other northern textile towns had their own depression. During this time, four of the city's factories closed down. The following decade almost two dozen closed. Wamsutta, however, increased its sales in 1925 while others were liquidating and closing. By 1935, their sheets were henceforth known as Supercale instead of percale. Additionally, they manufactured a new product called Lustercale, a blend of 60% cotton and 40% high strength Avril rayon. This blend feels like cotton but is somewhat softer. At some point Wamsutta changed the fiber content of Lustercale to 100% cotton. They also created the perfect weave for sails on sailing ships. Furthermore, because of the wars, they tailored their products for hot air balloons, gas mask fabric, military uniforms, and supplies. Many other fabric types were created for many other purposes and to this day Wamsutta remains a household name for fabrics.

=== Recent events ===
Beginning in 1985, Wamsutta was a brand name of Springs Global, a Brazilian textile conglomerate, except in North America, where the brand was owned by Bed Bath & Beyond, which acquired the brand from Springs Global in June 2012. Springs Global retains the rights to market the Wamsutta brand in South America.

The Wamsutta brand was discontinued in the United States around the time that Bed Bath & Beyond Inc. filed for bankruptcy in 2023. The brand was revived after the Indian textile exporter Indo Count Industries acquired the trademark rights in 2024.

In 2004, the historic Wamsutta Mills complex in Massachusetts was slated for redevelopment according to officials of New Bedford. The renovation will also include a 8,000-square-foot (740 m^{2}) featuring loft style apartments with up to 3 bedrooms.

== See also ==
- List of mills in New Bedford, Massachusetts
- National Register of Historic Places listings in New Bedford, Massachusetts
