= Wanskuck Historic District =

Historic district in Rhode Island, United States

- U.S. National Register of Historic Places
- U.S. Historic district
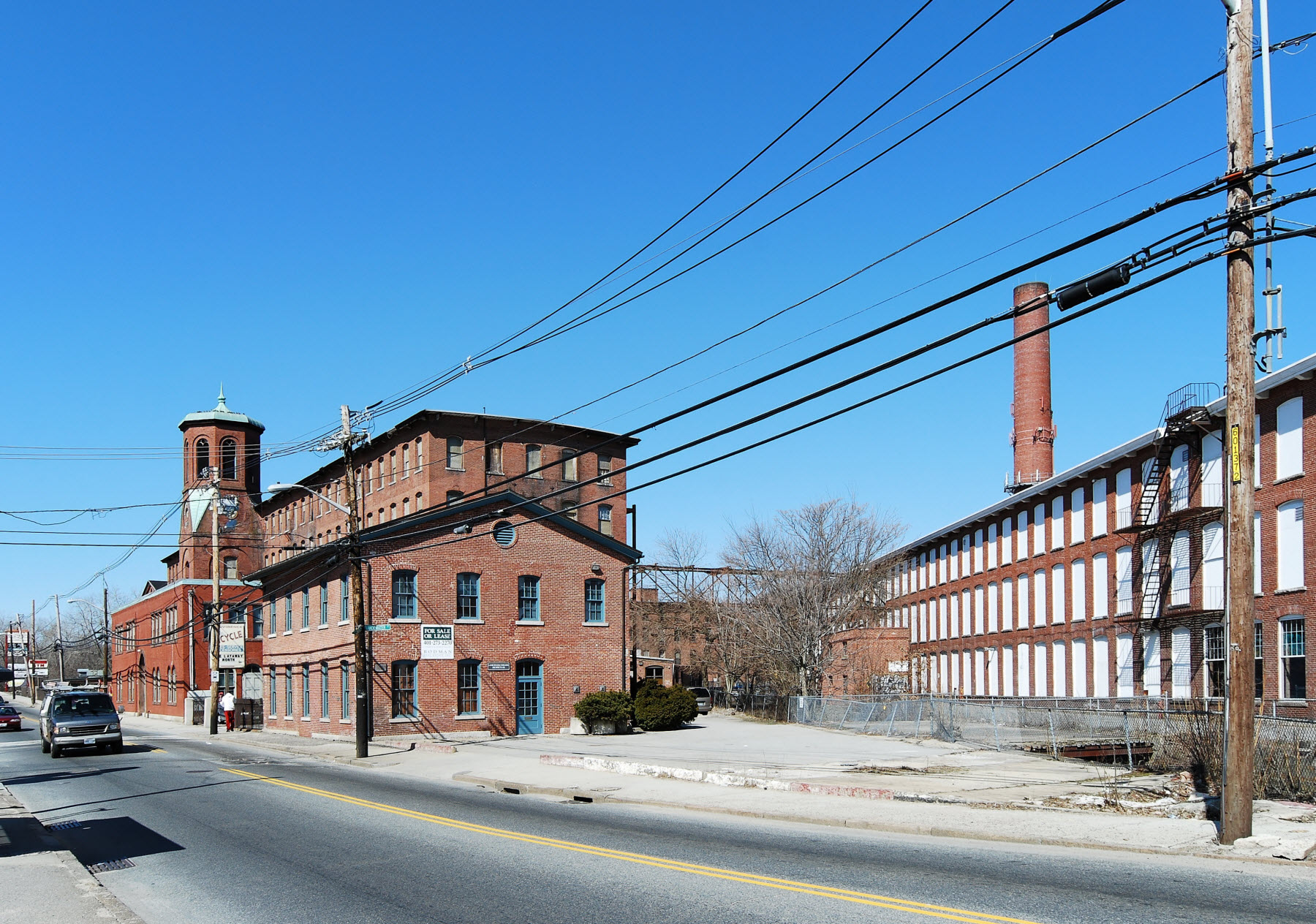

- Location within Rhode Island Location within the United States
- Location: Providence, Rhode Island
- Coordinates: 41°51′20″N 71°25′56″W
- Area: 119 acres (48 ha)
- Built: 1811
- NRHP reference No.: 83003867
- Added to NRHP: December 1, 1983

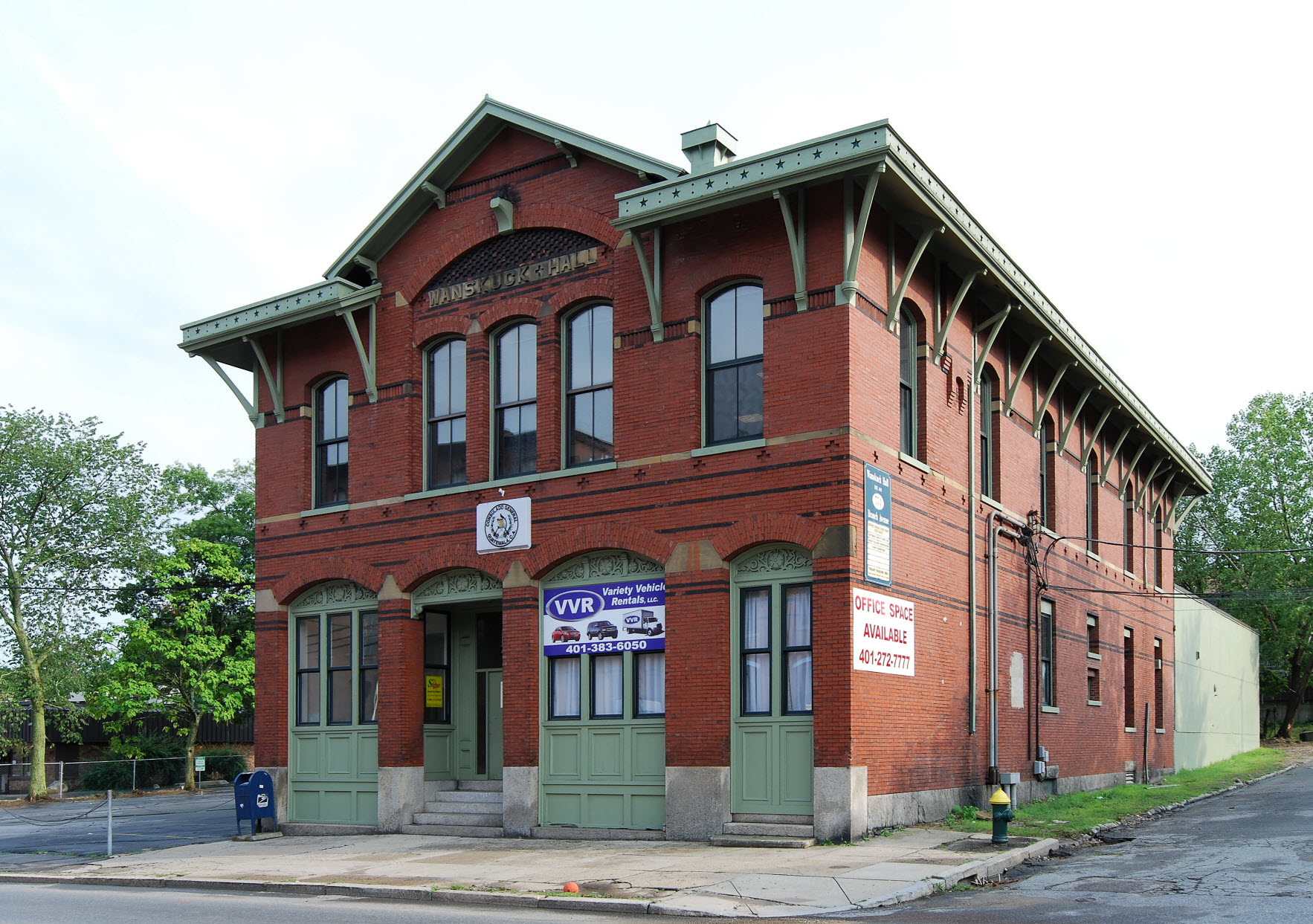
Wanskuck Hall

The Wanskuck Historic District is a historic district in the city of Providence, Rhode Island encompassing a mill village with more than two hundred years of history. As early as the mid-18th century, mills stood on the West River in northern Providence, a development which continued with the rise of industrialization in the 19th century. The mill village of Wanskuck is organized around three thoroughfares: Branch Street, Veazie Street, and Woodward Road, and is roughly bounded on the east by Louisquisset Pike (Rhode Island Route 146) and to the northwest by the city line with North Providence. The West River runs through the district, with its banks lined by two late-19th-century mill complexes. The village area includes a variety of examples of mill worker housing, from duplexes to rowhouses, as well as two church complexes and a community hall built in 1884 by the Wanskuck Company.

The district was listed on the National Register of Historic Places in 1983.

== See also ==
- National Register of Historic Places listings in Providence, Rhode Island
