= Christopher Markey =

American politician

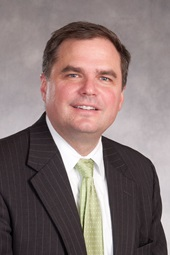

Member of the Massachusetts House of Representatives from the 9th Bristol district
- Incumbent
- Assumed office January 5, 2011
- Preceded by: John F. Quinn
- Succeeded by: Ed Pacheco (elect)

Personal details
- Party: Democratic
- Education: Stonehill College; Southern New England School of Law
- Occupation: Attorney
- Website: https://chrismarkeyda.com/

Christopher M. Markey is an American lawyer and politician serving as a member of the Massachusetts House of Representatives from the 9th Bristol district. A member of the Democratic Party, he was first elected in 2010. He is currently running for Bristol County District Attorney.

== Early life & career ==
Markey was born in 1967 to Carol Markey (née Tweedie) and John "Jack" Markey. He has a brother, John Jr., and two sisters, Carol Ann and Jennifer.

Markey's father served six terms as mayor of New Bedford from 1972 to 1982 and seventeen years as a judge on the city's Third District Court. His mother was an advocate for Voice of the Faithful during the Catholic Church sexual abuse scandal.

He attended Bishop Stang High School (1986), Stonehill College (1990), and Southern New England School of Law, where he graduated cum laude in 1994.

While attending law school, Markey was a Witness Victim Advocate in the Bristol County District Attorney's Office. He later served as an assistant district attorney in that office from 1995 until 2007, when he went into private practice. Markey continues to practice law and received the Massachusetts Bar Association's Legislator of the Year Award in 2019.

== Political career ==
In March 2010, Markey announced his candidacy to succeed John F. Quinn, who was running for Bristol County Sheriff. Markey defeated Dartmouth Democratic Town Committee chairman Raymond Medeiros and Dartmouth Finance Committee member Jason Wentworth in the Democratic primary and Dartmouth selectman Joe Michaud in the general election. He has run unopposed in all subsequent general elections except for 2014, when he defeated Republican Patrick Curran.

In 2022, Markey faced a primary challenge from Cameron S. Costa, a student member of the Massachusetts Board of Education. Markey defeated Costa by 2,341 votes.

As of 2024, Markey represents all of Dartmouth and a portion of Ward 1 in New Bedford.

=== Campaign for Bristol County District Attorney ===
In January 2026, Markey announced he will not run for re-election as a State Representative and instead run for Bristol County District Attorney, after incumbent DA Thomas Quinn announced he will not seek re-election.

=== Committee Assignments ===
==== 193rd General Court (2023-24) ====
- House Committee on Post Audit and Oversight
- Joint Committee on Mental Health, Substance Use and Recovery
- Joint Committee on Revenue
- Joint Committee on State Administration and Regulatory Oversight
- Joint Committee on the Judiciary

=== Assault ===
In March 2013, Markey accused political consultant David J. Oliveira of assaulting him outside an elementary school, leading to a collapsed lung and possible broken ribs. According to a police report, Oliveira believed Markey had been responsible for his being denied a job with the state. A clerk-magistrate found probable cause to charge Oliveira with assault and battery, but the two men reached a private agreement and no criminal complaint was issued.

== Political positions ==
=== Abortion ===
In 2020, Markey was one of sixteen Democrats in the House to vote against the ROE Act. He later explained his vote, saying he disagreed with allowing minors ages 16 to 17 to seek an abortion without parental consent. Markey later supported a bill to protect abortion providers and patients from legal actions by other states and expressed support for codifying abortion rights in the state constitution.

=== Housing ===
Markey has expressed support for using federal coronavirus relief funds to provide down payment assistance to allow renters become first-time homeowners. He has supported incentivizing municipalities to loosen zoning regulations.

=== Education ===
In 2019, Markey and Paul Schmid introduced a home rule petition to allow the creation of a 450 student neighborhood charter school. The legislature did not hold a vote on the petition and the plan was modified to a 594 student lottery-based charter school.

=== Taxes ===
In 2022, Markey opposed the Fair Share Amendment, which would increase taxes on residents earning more than a million dollars per year. He raised concern that the amendment would cause those residents to move and reduce the state's tax revenue. Markey was one of nine Democrats in the House to vote against the amendment, which was ultimately approved by Massachusetts voters.

In 2023, Markey voted in support of a $1 billion compromise tax relief package.

Markey has introduced legislation to provide tax credits for electrical agricultural and landscape equipment.

=== Energy and environmental policy ===
Markey supports the continued development of offshore wind while ensuring the continued success of the region's fishing industry. When Vineyard Wind 1 began delivering power in January 2024, Markey remarked it was "just the beginning of a tremendous story to come."

== Personal life ==
Markey and his wife Michaela have four children.

== See also ==
- 2019–2020 Massachusetts legislature
- 2021–2022 Massachusetts legislature
