= U of M School of Law =

U of M School of Law may refer to:

- University of Maine School of Law, Portland, Maine
- University of Maryland School of Law, Baltimore, Maryland
- University of Massachusetts School of Law, Dartmouth, Massachusetts
- University of Miami School of Law, Coral Gables, Floria
- University of Michigan Law School, Ann Arbor, Michigan
- University of Minnesota Law School, Minneapolis, Minnesota
- University of Mississippi School of Law, Oxford, Mississippi
- University of Missouri School of Law, Columbia, Missouri
- University of Montana School of Law, Missoula, Montana
