= University of Massachusetts =

Public university system in Massachusetts

- Type: Public university system
- Established: 1863; 163 years ago (Amherst campus); 1964 (UMass system)
- Endowment: $1.5 billion (2024)
- Budget: $3.79 billion (FY 2023)
- President: Marty Meehan
- Administrative staff: 17,506
- Students: 74,000 (2019)
- Location: Massachusetts, United States
- Campus: UMass Amherst UMass Boston UMass Dartmouth UMass Lowell UMass Chan Medical School UMass School of Law
- Nickname: UMass
- Website: www.massachusetts.edu

University of Massachusetts locations

The University of Massachusetts (UMass) is the public university system of the Commonwealth of Massachusetts. The university system includes six campuses (Amherst, Boston, Dartmouth, Lowell, a medical school in Worcester and a law school in Dartmouth), a satellite campus in Springfield and 25 smaller campuses throughout California and Washington with the University of Massachusetts Global. The system enrolled 73,593 students in fall 2023.

The University of Massachusetts system is governed by a president and a 22-member board of trustees. The system administration is in Boston and Shrewsbury. Each of the institutions in the system is accredited by the New England Commission of Higher Education.

== Administration ==
=== Board of trustees ===
The University of Massachusetts is governed by a board of trustees that functions as a legislative body dealing mainly with questions of policy. The board establishes the general policies governing the university, but has delegated many powers to the president and, through the president, to campus administrators for day-to-day-operations. In certain rare instances when required by the Massachusetts General Laws, it may function as an appeal body.

The founding board had fourteen appointed members and four ex-officio members. Formerly, trustees were appointed by the legislature or the board itself; currently, members are appointed by the governor. The size of the board has fluctuated between twelve and twenty-four members. The current board is composed of nineteen voting members and three ex-officio non-voting members. Seventeen board members are appointed by the governor of the Commonwealth; at least five of those appointed must be alumni of the university, and one must be a representative of organized labor. The other two voting members are students. Overall, the board has five student members, elected for one-year terms, from the Amherst, Boston, Dartmouth, Lowell, and Worcester campuses. Voting membership rotates among the campuses: two students are voting members and three others are non-voting members.

== Presidents ==
The president is the university's chief executive officer and works to advance its mission of education, research and public service. Marty Meehan became the 27th president of the five-campus, 73,000-student University of Massachusetts system on July 1, 2015.

Before the 1962 establishment of the medical school, the president was the administrator of the system's only campus in Amherst. When UMass Boston was organized in 1964, it was headed by a chancellor who reported to the president. In 1970, as part of a reorganization, day-to-day leadership responsibilities for UMass Amherst were transferred to a chancellor, with both chancellors reporting on an equal basis to the president. Today, the president administers five campuses.

The following persons have led what has become the University of Massachusetts system:

| No. | Image | President | Term start | Term end | Ref. |
|---|---|---|---|---|---|
Presidents of Massachusetts Agricultural College (1863–1931)
| 1 | | Henry F. French | 1864 | 1866 | |
| 2 | | Paul A. Chadbourne | 1866 | 1867 | |
| 3 | | William S. Clark | 1867 | 1879 | |
| 4 | | Charles L. Flint | 1879 | 1880 | |
| Acting | | Levi Stockbridge | 1876 | 1876 | |
| 5 | | Levi Stockbridge | 1880 | 1882 | |
| 6 | | Paul A. Chadbourne | 1882 | 1883 | |
| Acting | | Henry H. Goodell | 1883 | 1883 | |
| 7 | | James C. Greenough | 1883 | 1886 | |
| 8 | | Henry H. Goodell | 1886 | 1905 | |
| 9 | | William P. Brooks | 1905 | 1906 | |
| 10 | | Kenyon L. Butterfield | 1906 | 1924 | |
| Acting | | Edward M. Lewis | 1912 | 1912 | |
| 11 | | Edward M. Lewis | 1924 | 1927 | |
Presidents of Massachusetts State College (1931–1947)
| 12 | | Roscoe W. Thatcher | 1927 | 1932 | |
| 13 | | Hugh P. Baker | 1933 | 1947 | |
Presidents of the University of Massachusetts (1947-1970)
| 14 | | Ralph A. Van Meter | 1947 | 1954 | |
| 15 | | Jean Paul Mather | 1954 | 1960 | |
| 16 | | John W. Lederle | 1960 | 1970 | |
Presidents of the University of Massachusetts system (1970–present)
| 17 | | Robert C. Wood | 1970 | 1977 | |
| interim | | Franklin K. Patterson | 1978 | 1978 | |
| 18 | | David C. Knapp | 1978 | 1990 | |
| 19 | | Joseph D. Duffey | March 1990 | July 1991 | |
| interim | | E. K. Fretwell | 1991 | 1992 | |
| 20 | | Michael Hooker | 1992 | 1995 (Note: Resigned to head the University of North Carolina at Chapel Hill.) | |
| interim | | Sherry H. Penney | 1995 | 1996 | |
| 24 | | William Bulger | January 4, 1996 | September 1, 2003 | |
| interim | | Jack M. Wilson | September 2, 2003 | March 24, 2004 | |
| 25 | | Jack M. Wilson | March 24, 2004 | June 30, 2011 | |
| 26 | | Robert Caret | July 1, 2011 | June 30, 2015 (Note: Resigned to head the University System of Maryland.) | |
| 27 | | Marty Meehan | July 1, 2015 | present | |

Table notes:

== Campuses ==
The University of Massachusetts Amherst is the largest school in the UMass system. It was also the first one established, dating back to 1863, when it was founded as the Massachusetts Agricultural College. The University of Massachusetts Chan Medical School was founded in 1962, and is located in Worcester. The University of Massachusetts Boston, originally established in 1964, was merged with Boston State College in 1982. In 1991, the University of Lowell and Southeastern Massachusetts University joined the system as the University of Massachusetts Lowell and University of Massachusetts Dartmouth, respectively.

=== Amherst ===
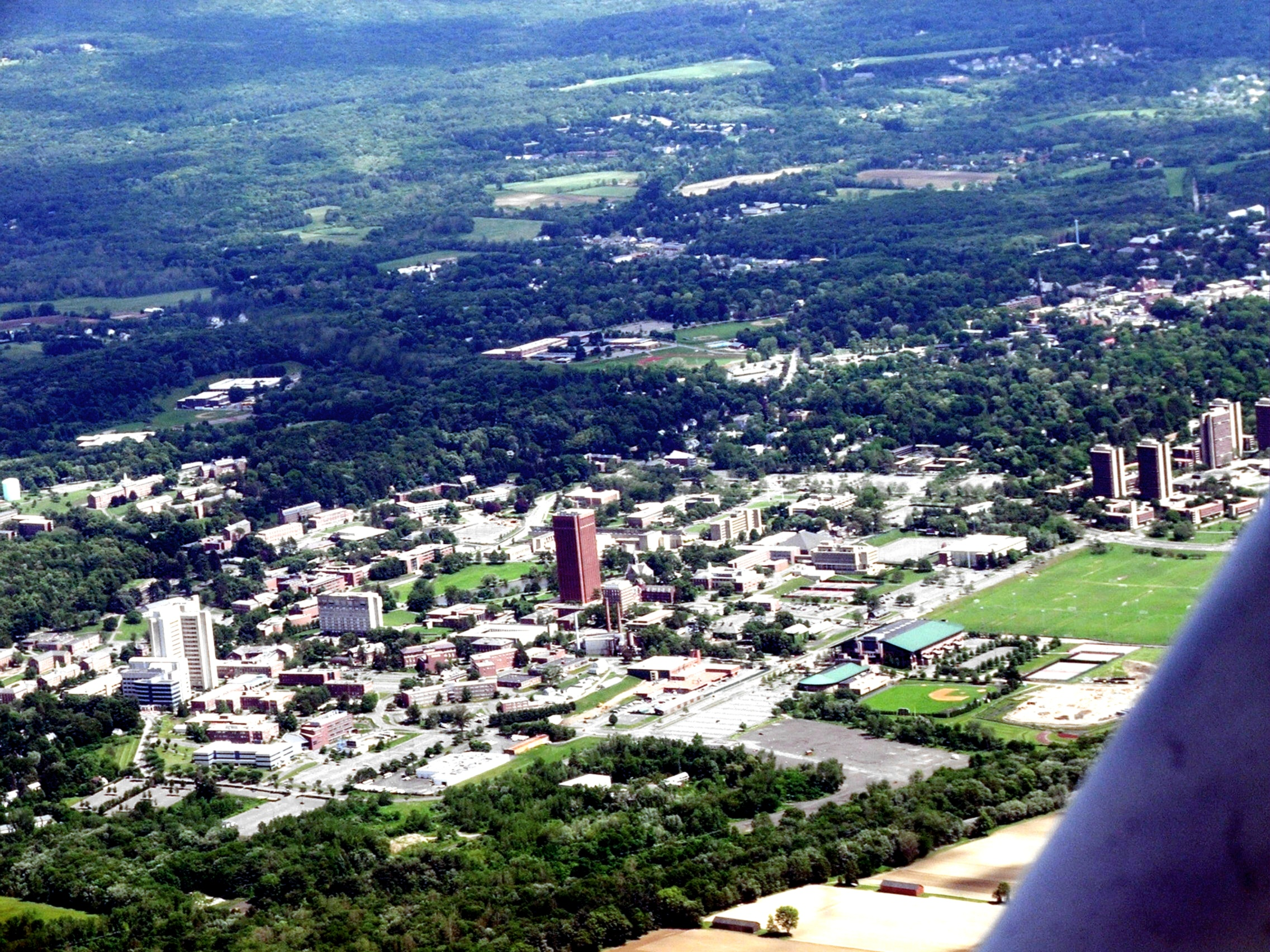
UMass Amherst looking southeast from the air (2006)

Amherst is the flagship and the largest of the UMass campuses, as well as the first established. Like many colleges and universities, the Massachusetts Agricultural College (as it was originally called) in Amherst was founded as a land-grant college in 1863, receiving initial start-up funding as part of the Morrill Land-Grant Colleges Act. It became "Massachusetts State College" in 1931, and "University of Massachusetts" in 1947. The library system is the largest state-supported library system in New England with over 6.1 million items.

Students participate in 240 campus organizations, 21 NCAA Division I athletic teams, living-learning residence halls, community service, internships, and faculty research. Massachusetts is also part of the Five Colleges consortium, with Smith, Mount Holyoke, Hampshire, and Amherst colleges, all within a free bus ride of each other using the Pioneer Valley Transit Authority. Students can take classes on any of these campuses and participate in all co-curricular and cultural activities.

=== Boston ===
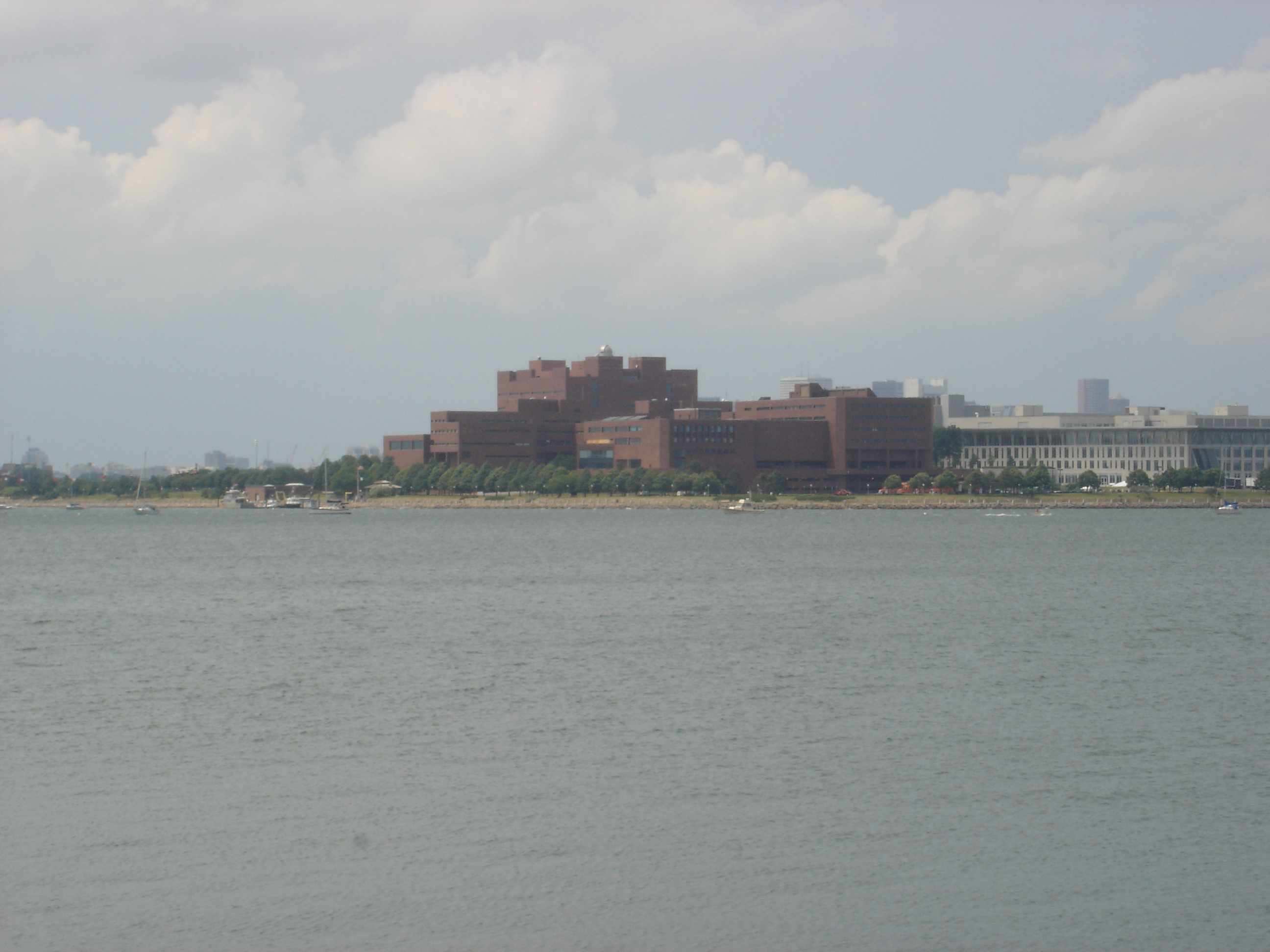
The UMass Boston campus, viewed from Squantum Point Park in Quincy

UMass Boston is a research university located in the City of Boston. Located on the Columbia Point peninsula, the university is surrounded by the Boston Harbor, the John F. Kennedy Library and the Massachusetts State Archives. The Boston Globe is also headquartered adjacent to campus, as well as Boston College High School. Subsequently, the university holds many partnerships with its neighboring organizations, providing research and employment opportunities.

UMass Boston enrolls more than 12,000 undergraduates and nearly 4,000 graduate students, making it the third largest campus in the system. The university has five undergraduate colleges and two graduate colleges, with over 100 undergraduate programs and 50 graduate programs. The campus is also home to more than 100 student organizations—including clubs, literary magazines, newspaper, radio station, art gallery, and 16 NCAA Division III sports teams.

=== Dartmouth ===
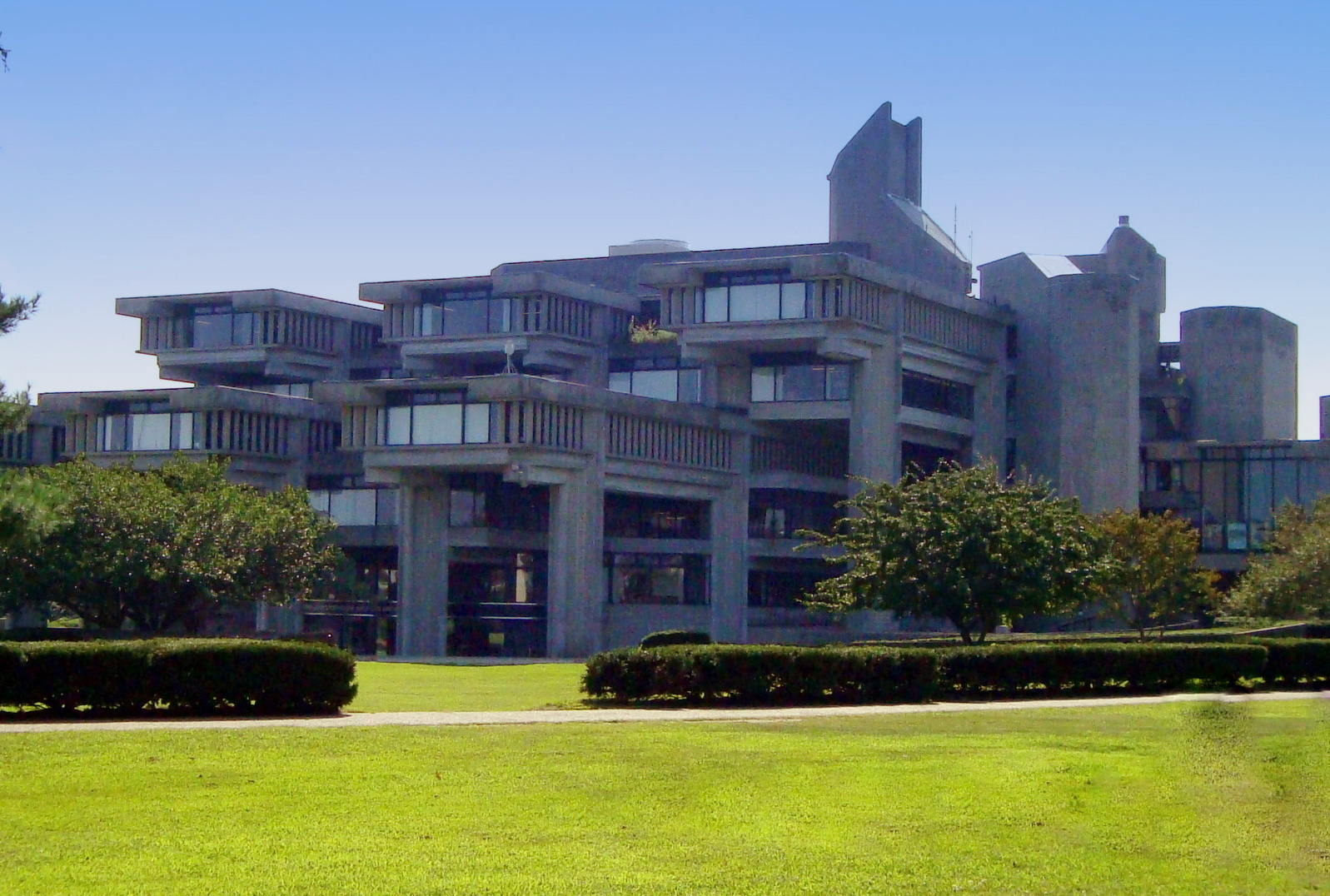
The Claire T. Carney Library

Located in southeastern Massachusetts, UMass Dartmouth started in 1895 as the New Bedford Textile School, the Bradford Durfee Textile School, and later Southeastern Massachusetts University (SMU). In addition to the 710-acre (2.9 km^{2}) UMass Dartmouth main campus is, satellite campuses are located throughout the South Coast.

The university has nearly 8,000 students and 65 degree programs in its College of Arts & Sciences; Charlton College of Business; College of Engineering; College of Nursing; College of Visual and Performing Arts; School of Education, Public Policy, and Civic Engagement; and the School for Marine Science and Technology. The university hosts internships, undergraduate research opportunities, and service learning experiences, as well as an Honors Program.

The university has more than 100 student organizations and 25 NCAA Division III athletic teams. The buildings of the campus were designed by internationally renowned Modernist architect Paul Rudolph.

The University of Massachusetts School of Law was opened in September 2010 three miles from the Dartmouth campus.

=== Lowell ===
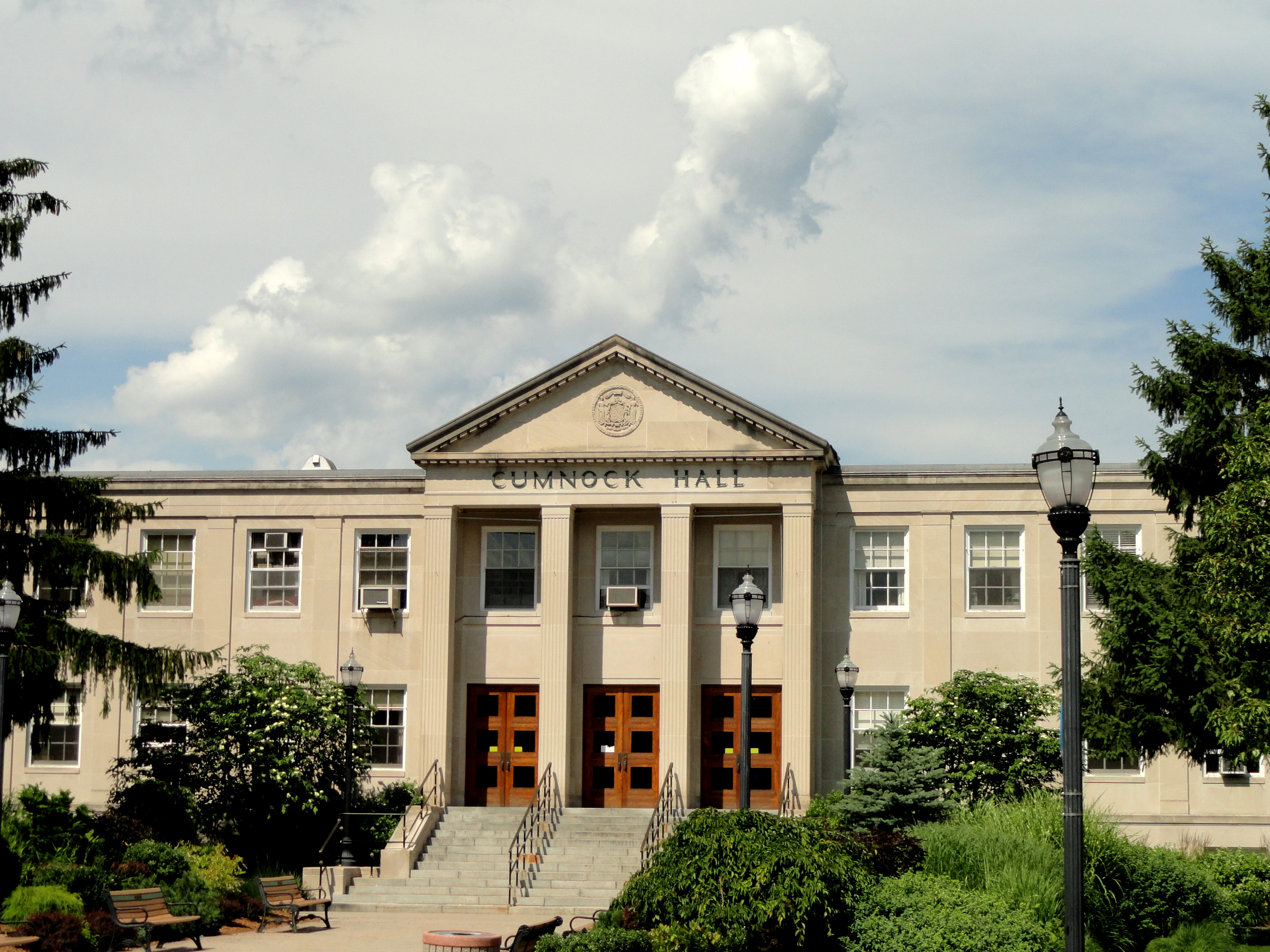
Cumnock Hall, on North Campus

UMass Lowell is the product of a 1971 merger between Lowell State College (founded in 1894 as Lowell Normal School) and Lowell Technological Institute (founded in 1895 as the Lowell Textile School). The merged institution became the University of Lowell, with the former Lowell Tech serving as the North Campus and the former Lowell State serving as the South Campus.

UMass Lowell is located in the Merrimack Valley. It had a total of 18,316 students as of fall 2017 and is the fastest growing of the five UMass campuses. The campus offers over 120 programs taught by 737 faculty members in five colleges.

There are 12 residence halls on the campus. There are more than 120 active student organizations on campus, a campus recreation center, 16 NCAA Division I sports teams that compete in the America East Conference, and the ice hockey team that competes in the Hockey East Conference.

=== Chan Medical School ===
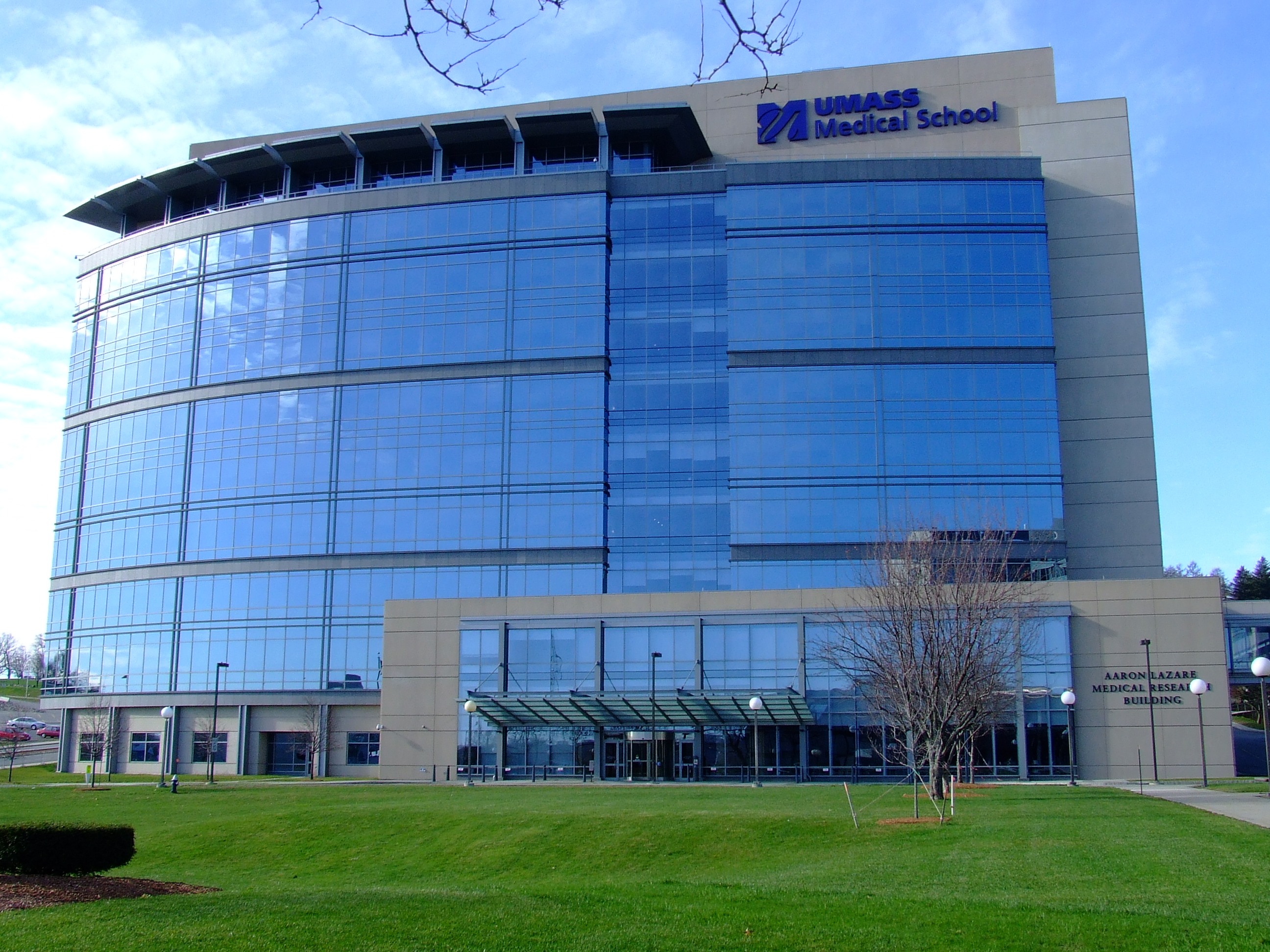
The Lazare Research Building

The University of Massachusetts Worcester, also known as UMass Chan Medical School or UMass Medical School, is one of the fastest growing academic health science centers in the country and is home to the School of Medicine (SOM)—the Commonwealth's only public medical school—the Graduate School of Biomedical Sciences (GSBS), the Graduate School of Nursing (GSN), and a research enterprise that attracts more than $200 million in external funding annually. Its 63-acre (250,000 m^{2}) campus is shared with clinical partner UMass Memorial Health Care, the region's largest employer.

The work of UMass Chan Medical researcher and 2006 Nobel Prize winner Craig Mello toward the discovery of RNA interference has launched a new field of research. The school is also the home of the Albert Sherman Center, an interdisciplinary, research and education facility that fosters collaboration among scientists and innovation across disciplines.

=== School of Law ===
The University of Massachusetts School of Law also known as the University of Massachusetts - Dartmouth Law School, UMass Law School or UMass Law is located near the main campus of UMass Dartmouth in North Dartmouth, Massachusetts and is also a part of UMass Dartmouth.

UMass Law was established in 1981 as the Southeastern Massachusetts-Rhode Island-Avins Law School with a volunteer faculty and a handful of part-time students. It grew from a store-front operation, offering a weekend program of study in Fall River, Massachusetts to a dual-division law school located in its own state-of-the-art facility in North Dartmouth, Massachusetts.

In 1986 the Southeastern Massachusetts-Rhode Island-Avins Law School became the Southern New England School of Law (SNESL). In 1992 the first full-time program at SNESL was established along with SNESL's first day classes. In 1994 SNESL moved to its new current site at 333 Faunce Corner Road in North Dartmouth, Massachusetts. In 1995 SNESL was Accredited by New England Association of Schools and Colleges. In 2009 University of Massachusetts Board of Trustees approves UMass Dartmouth plan to offer Juris Doctor (JD) degrees at SNESL.

In 2010 the Massachusetts Board of Higher Education authorized UMass Dartmouth to offer JD degrees along with the establishment of the University of Massachusetts School of Law - Dartmouth (UMass Law). UMass Law was made possible by a $23 million donation of assets, a facility, land, library, technology, and cash from the Southern New England School of Law. In 2010 at the time of the donation from SNESL, SNESL had 1,200 alumni, 200 students, 13 full-time faculty members, and 24 adjunct faculty.

Also in 2010 the first UMass Law class matriculates. In 2011 UMass Law confers their first JD degrees. In 2012 UMass Law was granted provisional approval by Council of the Section of Legal Education and Admissions to the Bar of the American Bar Association with full accreditation being granted four years later.

=== UMass Amherst Center at Springfield ===
On August 8, 2013, the University of Massachusetts started requesting proposals for potential classroom and office space to establish a satellite center in Springfield. UMass was looking for 25,000 square feet of space that it would use for classrooms, faculty offices and other uses, with the option of doubling the amount of space at a later date. On November 23, 2013, Gov. Deval Patrick and University of Massachusetts President Robert L. Caret announced the selection of Tower Square in downtown Springfield as the university's new satellite center. The university would lease 27,321 square feet on the second floor of the 30-floor building, which is owned by the Massachusetts Mutual Life Insurance Co. and located at 1500 Main St. UMass planned to establish academic programs at the center starting in the fall 2014.

In 2014, the state of Massachusetts gave $5.2 million to the Springfield satellite center to allow the university to complete construction and buy furnishings.

The satellite center, administered by the Amherst campus, opened in March 2014, registering students for September 2014. Programs include nursing, education, business administration, addiction counseling, and GED classes. Enrollment in the more than 20 courses offered at the center has grown from 250 students in the fall of 2014 when it opened to 850 in the spring of 2016, according to Daniel Montagna, director of operations at the center. The institution offers a cybersecurity certificate program funded in 2017 by a $5 million investment by MassMutual.

== Global ==
In September 2021, Brandman University reaffiliated with the University of Massachusetts from Chapman University via a change of control agreement and rebranded as UMass Global.

== Research ==
=== Collaborations ===
The Massachusetts Green High Performance Computing Center is a joint venture of the University of Massachusetts system, MIT, Harvard, Boston University, and Northeastern to build a shared high-performance computing facility. In 2010, UMass Boston partnered with Dana–Farber/Harvard Cancer Center to collaborate on research aimed at addressing issues of cancer health disparities in disenfranchised populations under U54 Cancer Partnership.

=== Inter Campus Programs ===
University of Massachusetts Intercampus Graduate School of Marine Sciences and Technology is a graduate degree program offering Master of Science, Doctor of Philosophy and Professional Science Master's Degree. The graduates receive a joint degree from all four of the main UMass campuses.

== Gallery ==
Logos of the UMass school system

Logotype for the UMass system.

Logo for the UMass Lowell campus.

Logo for the UMass Boston campus.

Logo used for UMass Chan Medical School.

Logo for UMass Law.

== See also ==
- Education in Massachusetts
- List of colleges and universities in Massachusetts
- Massachusetts Department of Higher Education
