= New Bedford Institute of Technology =

- Logo of the New Bedford Institute of Technology
- Type: Public
- Active: 1899–1964
- Location: New Bedford, Massachusetts, United States; 41°38′28.67″N 70°55′37.85″W
- Campus: Urban

The New Bedford Institute of Technology was a public college located in New Bedford, Massachusetts, United States. It was founded in 1899 as the New Bedford Textile School.

== History ==
The New Bedford Textile School was funded under a bill that appropriated money for three textile schools in the major textile cities in Massachusetts. The school was built at 1213 Purchase Street. The city matched the funds of the state when the school was being built.

The first classes offered were meant to refine the skills of the mill workers. As a result, classes were offered during the day and night. The first class ever offered at the school was the "General Cotton Course". Curriculum at the school later expanded to include knitting technology, chemistry of textiles, dyeing and finishing and fashion and textile design. After the Second World War, the school began offering degrees in engineering, chemistry, and business administration. These additions came in response for the increased need for educational opportunities in the area. Due to the increased demand, the Board of Collegiate Authority approved the Trustees’ request to grant a Bachelor of Science degree in November 1948. In 1950, 42 graduates earned their degree in textile chemistry, textile engineering, and machine design.

Because of the change in the mission of the school, the name of the school was changed to the New Bedford Textile Institute in 1946. In 1957, the name of the school was again changed to the New Bedford Institute of Textiles and Technology.

=== Merger ===
In the 1950s and 60s, the school had plans of expansion. As Bradford Durfee College of Technology was also nearby, the state set up a committee to merge the schools. The merger with Bradford Durfee College was completed in 1964, forming the Southeastern Massachusetts Technological Institute. The new school was located in North Dartmouth. In 1991, the merged school became part of the University of Massachusetts system as the University of Massachusetts Dartmouth.

== Campus usage ==
From 1985 until 1988, the building on Purchase Street was used by the Swain School of Design until it merged with the Southeastern Massachusetts University in 1988. From then until 2001, the building was used by the University of Massachusetts Dartmouth.

== Notable alumni ==
- Seabury Stanton, chairman of Berkshire Hathaway prior to its takeover by Warren Buffett
