= Ed Pacheco =

American politician

Member-elect of the Massachusetts House of Representatives from the 9th Bristol district
- Assuming office January 2027
- Succeeding: Christopher Markey

Personal details
- Party: Democratic

Ed Pacheco is an American politician. A member of the Democratic Party, he is the member-elect for the 9th Bristol district of the Massachusetts House of Representatives.
