= Bradford Durfee College of Technology =

Former college at Fall River, Massachusetts, United States

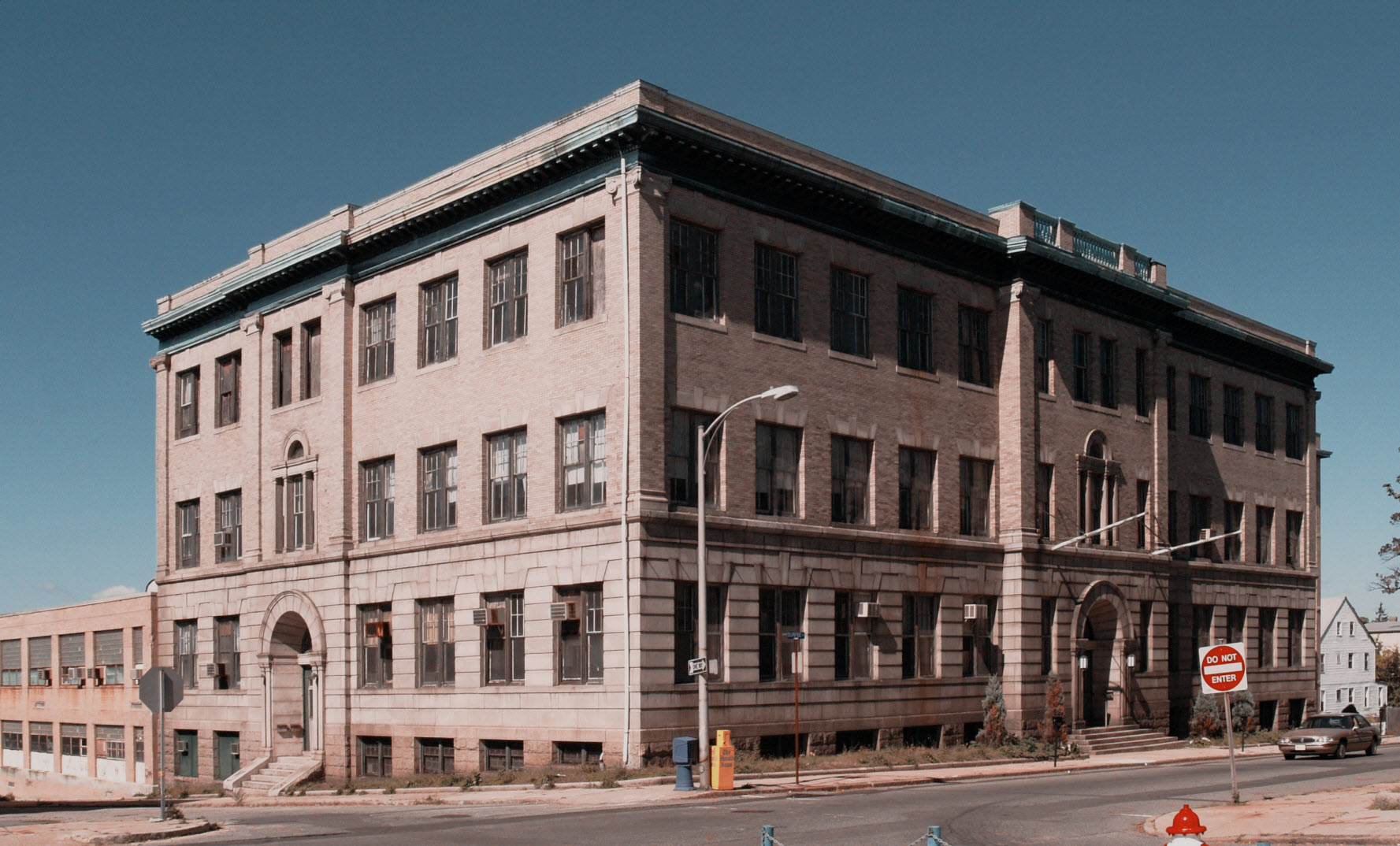
- Type: Public
- Active: 1899; 127 years ago – 1964; 62 years ago
- Location: Fall River, Massachusetts, United States; 41°42′12.47″N 71°9′24.47″W
- Campus: Urban
- Bradford Durfee Textile School
- U.S. National Register of Historic Places
- Location within Massachusetts
- Location: 64 Durfee Street, Fall River, Massachusetts
- Area: 1.33 acres (0.54 ha)
- NRHP reference No.: 100009976
- Added to NRHP: February 20, 2024

The Bradford Durfee College of Technology was a college located in Fall River, Massachusetts. It was chartered in 1895 as the Bradford Durfee Textile School. It was then incorporated in 1899 and opened in 1904. The school was named after Bradford Durfee (1788–1843), a leading early Fall River industrialist.

== History ==
=== Creation and beginnings ===
The school was originally built with $35,000 in funds from the state. These funds were then matched by the state, following a precedent at the other two state textile schools in Lowell and New Bedford. The first class was five days a week and involved 163 students. Four general courses were offered, with the subjects mainly focusing around textiles. A three-year program in General Cotton Manufacturing was also offered along with two courses in Designing and Weaving and in Chemistry and Dyeing. As time went on and the curriculum got more intense, the courses were extended to three years. Around that time, a course in Mechanical Engineering was also added.

In 1946, the name of the college was changed to the Bradford Durfee Technical Institute. In 1947, the school was allowed to grant the Bachelor of Science degree. In 1958, the name of the school was again changed to the Bradford Durfee College of Technology. This name change reflected the changing mission of the school, as it was now able to grant degrees. This also occurred because non-degree schools which granted degrees in less than four years were known as technical institutes.

=== Merger ===
In the 1950s and 60s, the school had plans of expansion. As the New Bedford Institute of Technology was also nearby, the state legislature merged the two schools in 1960 to form the Southeastern Massachusetts Technological Institute (SMTI). Construction of a new campus for the school, located in North Dartmouth, began in 1964. In 1991, the merged school became part of the University of Massachusetts system as the University of Massachusetts Dartmouth. The complex on Durfee Street was listed on the National Register of Historic Places in 2024.
