= Gerald A. LeBlanc =

American biologist, toxicologist, author

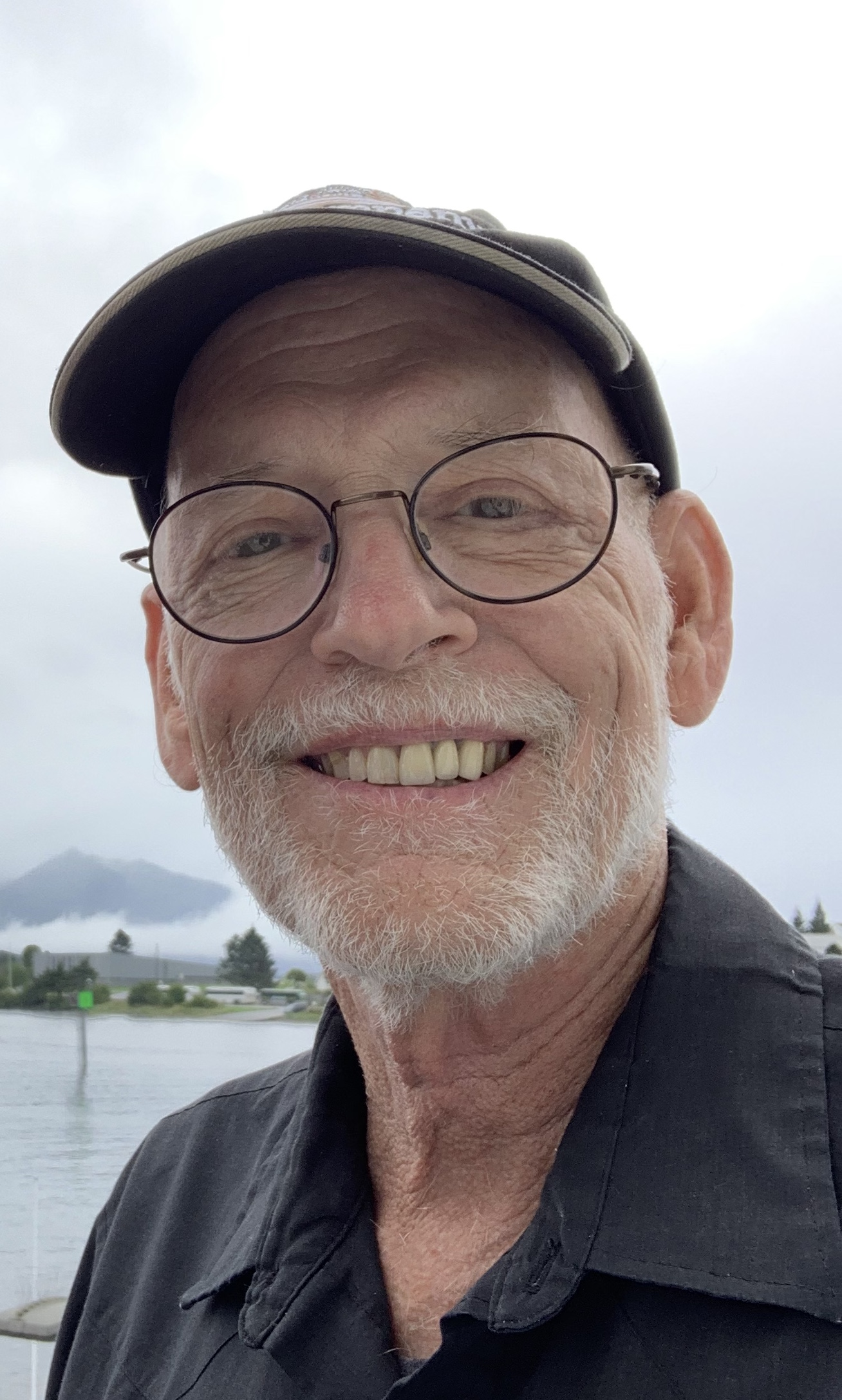
- Occupations: Biologist, toxicologist, author, and academic

Academic background
- Education: BS in Biology; MA in Biology; PhD in Biology
- Alma mater: University of Massachusetts Dartmouth; Bridgewater State University; University of South Florida
- Thesis: Glutathione S-Transferases of Daphnia magna: Characterization of Structure and Function (1986)

Gerald A. LeBlanc is an American biologist, toxicologist, author, and academic. He is a professor emeritus in the Department of Biological Sciences at the North Carolina State University.

LeBlanc's research interests span the fields of environmental toxicology and risk assessment with a focus on investigating the processes involved in the endocrine regulation of reproduction and development, as well as how environmental agents can disrupt these processes. He is the author of the book, Everyday Chemicals: Understanding the Risks and has published over 190 articles.

== Education and early career ==
LeBlanc received his bachelor's degree in biology from the University of Massachusetts Dartmouth in 1975, followed by a Master's in Biology from Bridgewater State University in 1981. Following his Bachelor's, he started his professional career as an Aquatic Toxicologist at EG&G Bionomics in Wareham, Massachusetts in 1975, a position he held for five years. Subsequently, in 1980, he was appointed as the Director of Toxicology and held that position until 1983. He then joined the University of South Florida in Tampa in 1983 as a Research Associate and received his Ph.D. in biology in 1986. From 1986 to 1989 he served as a Research Fellow in the Department of Biological Chemistry & Molecular Pharmacology and Dana-Farber Cancer Institute at Harvard Medical School where he completed his post-doctoral training.

== Career ==
LeBlanc began his academic career in 1989 at North Carolina State University, where he became a professor of Toxicology and Environmental Health. He also served as an adjunct professor from 2012 to 2016 in the Department of Biological Sciences at Clemson University in South Carolina.

== Research ==
LeBlanc is most known for his contributions to the field of environmental health sciences, focusing his research on the effects of environmental contaminants on human and environmental health. With a particular emphasis on endocrine-disrupting compounds, his research has centered on exploring the mechanisms of action and toxicological properties of diverse environmental chemicals. In his book, Everyday Chemicals: Understanding the Risks, he has provided details into the potential health risks associated with chemicals to which people are commonly exposed and has given a nontechnical overview of the essential factors involved in assessing whether exposure to chemicals in everyday lives could cause harm.

=== Endocrine disruption ===
LeBlanc's research in the field of toxicology, particularly centered on endocrine disruption, has contributed to the understanding of the impact of environmental contaminants on human and wildlife health. He investigated the impacts of endocrine-disrupting chemicals on mammals, fishes, reptiles, and invertebrates. He identified the suite of nuclear receptors in the crustacean, Daphnia pulex, and functionally characterized several of these receptors. He deciphered the neuro-endocrine signaling pathway responsible for sex determination in some crustaceans, including the discovery of the hormone responsible for sex determination, methyl farnesoate, and its receptor protein. He also demonstrated that some insecticides can mimic the action of methyl farnesoate in daphnids resulting in altered sex ratios of offspring.

In 2005, LeBlanc created a mathematical model that integrated concentration addition, response addition, and toxicokinetic interactions to enable the assessment of the toxicity of chemical mixtures. He demonstrated the utility of this model by assessing the joint toxicity of 9 chemicals commonly found in surface waters in the US. This model has been used by regulatory agencies and has been recommended by the National Research Council in the assessment of risks to endangered and threatened species from exposure to pesticide mixtures.

== Risk assessment ==
LeBlanc has conducted research in risk assessments, notably, identifying chemicals for prioritization in environmental risk assessments. He suggested the integration of surrogate species and biomarkers of chronic toxicity into conventional toxicity assessments to enhance the accuracy and effectiveness of environmental risk assessments. In a collaborative study, he suggested that hepatic testosterone biotransformation enzymes serve as more reliable indicators of puberty compared to preputial separation, and recommended the inclusion of these enzymes in risk assessment protocols for potential xenoestrogens. He assessed the risk associated with several environmental chemicals including phthalate esters in bottled drinking water and tributyltin in marine organisms.

== Awards and honors ==
- 1985 – Outstanding research, Sigma Xi
- 1985 – Outstanding research, Florida Academy of Sciences
- 1986 – Outstanding research, Florida Academy of Sciences
- 1987 – Richard A. Smith Award, Harvard Medical School

== Bibliography ==
=== Books ===
- Everyday Chemicals: Understanding the Risks (2023) ISBN 978-0231205962

=== Selected articles ===
- Vom Saal, F. S., Akingbemi, B. T., Belcher, S. M., Birnbaum, L. S., Crain, D. A., Eriksen, M., ... & Zoeller, R. T. (2007). Chapel Hill bisphenol A expert panel consensus statement: integration of mechanisms, effects in animals and potential to impact human health at current levels of exposure. Reproductive Toxicology, 24(2), 131–138.
- LeBlanc G.A. (2007). Crustacean endocrine toxicology: a review. Ecotoxicology, 16, 61–81.
- Camp A. A., Yun J., Chambers S. A., Maher H. H., LeBlanc G. A. (2020). Involvement of glutamate and serotonin transmitter systems in male sex determination in Daphnia pulex. Journal of Insect Physiology. 121: doi.org/10.1016/j.jinsphys.2020.104015.
- Xu, X., Zhou, G., Lei, K., LeBlanc, G. A., & An, L. (2020). Phthalate esters and their potential risk in PET bottled water stored under common conditions. International Journal of Environmental Research and Public Health, 17(1), 141.
- Ford, A. T., & LeBlanc, G. A. (2020). Endocrine disruption in invertebrates: A survey of research progress. Environmental Science & Technology, 54(21), 13365–13369.
- Morthorst J.E, Holbech H., De Croze N., Mattiessen P., & LeBlanc G.A. (2022). Thyroid-like hormone signaling in invertebrates and its potential role in initial screening of thyroid hormone system disrupting chemicals. Integrative Environmental Assessment & Management. 18:62-82.
