= Wamsutta Club =

Private social club in New Bedford, Massachusetts

Coordinates: 41°37′58.9″N 70°55′50.5″W

The Wamsutta Club is a private social club in New Bedford, Massachusetts, founded in 1866. It was a club for the affluent members of New Bedford's community, which at the time was supported by the flagging whaling industry as well as the up-and-coming textiles.

The club was founded by Charles Warren Clifford, who organized an athletic club to play a new version of baseball. The social club was formally chartered in 1889. The present location was built in 1821 by James Arnold and purchased by the club in 1919.

The club's popularity soared from the 1890s to the mid-1920s when the textile industry was at its height in the city, and cotton was bought and sold by businessmen at the club.

During the Great Depression the club faced the problem of declining membership. In order to meet the needs of the expanding community dues were lowered and membership was re-established on a broader base.

In the 1960s the club was the site of a meeting between Otis Stanton, brother of Seabury Stanton, and Warren Buffett when Buffett finalized his takeover of Berkshire Hathaway.

== See also ==
- List of American gentlemen's clubs
