= University of Massachusetts Dartmouth =

Public university in Dartmouth, Massachusetts, U.S.

- Former names: Southeastern Massachusetts Technological Institute (1962–1969); Southeastern Massachusetts University (1969–1991)
- Type: Public research university
- Established: 1895; 131 years ago as Bradford Durfee Textile School; 1899; 127 years ago as New Bedford Textile School; 1962; 64 years ago (merged institution)
- Parent institution: University of Massachusetts
- Accreditation: NECHE
- Academic affiliations: Space grant
- Endowment: $76 million (2024)
- Budget: $305.8 million (FY 2026)
- Chancellor: Mark A. Fuller
- Provost: Ramprasad Balasubramanian
- Faculty: 402
- Students: 7,968 (fall 2024)
- Undergraduates: 5,731 (fall 2024)
- Postgraduates: 2,237 (fall 2024)
- Location: Dartmouth, Massachusetts, U.S. 41°37′43″N 71°00′22″W
- Campus: Suburban, 710 acres (290 ha) with unique modern architectural design
- Colors: Blue and gold
- Nickname: Corsair
- Sporting affiliations: NCAA Division III – Little East; MASCAC; NEISA
- Mascot: Arnie the Corsair
- Website: umassd.edu

The University of Massachusetts Dartmouth (UMass Dartmouth or UMassD) is a public research university in Dartmouth, Massachusetts. It is the southernmost campus of the University of Massachusetts system. Formerly "Southeastern Massachusetts University" (known locally as "SMU"), it was merged into the University of Massachusetts system in 1991.

The campus has an overall student body of 8,513 students (school year 2019–2020), including 6,841 undergraduates and 1,672 graduate/law students. As of the 2019–2020 academic year, UMass Dartmouth had 402 full-time faculty on staff. The Dartmouth campus also includes the University of Massachusetts School of Law. UMass Dartmouth is classified among "R2: Doctoral Universities – High research activity".

The university has nine colleges including law, engineering, art & science and honors college, each having several departments.

== History ==
The University of Massachusetts Dartmouth traces its roots to 1895 when the Massachusetts legislature chartered the New Bedford Textile School in New Bedford and the Bradford Durfee Textile School in Fall River. The New Bedford Textile School was renamed the "New Bedford Institute of Textiles and Technology", and the Bradford Durfee Textile School was renamed the "Bradford Durfee College of Technology".

In 1962, the two schools were combined to create the "Southeastern Massachusetts Technological Institute", expanding to become "Southeastern Massachusetts University" by 1969.

The university sits on a 710-acre site acquired in the early 1960s. In 1964, the ground was broken on a unified campus not far from the Smith Mills section of Dartmouth between the two cities of New Bedford and Fall River. The Liberal Arts building was completed in 1966, the Science & Engineering building in 1969, and the other original buildings were finished by 1971. The main campus has been expanded several times, including the Cedar Dell residences (begun in 1987), the Dion Science & Engineering Building in 1989, the Charlton College of Business in 2004, the new apartment-style residence halls in 2005, and the Research Building in 2007.

In 1991, SMU joined the UMass system and adopted its present name, the "University of Massachusetts Dartmouth". Since then, the university has expanded back into its original cities as well, with the Center for Innovation & Entrepreneurship, formerly Advanced Textiles & Manufacturing Center, (2001, at the former Kerr Mill site in Fall River) and Professional and Continuing Education Center (2002, in the former Cherry & Webb building in Fall River), and the School for Marine Science and Technology (1996, adjacent to Fort Rodman in New Bedford), the Star Store visual arts building in New Bedford (2001) and a second Center for Professional and Continuing Education (2002, one block north on Purchase Street) in New Bedford.

Billionaire Robert T. Hale spoke at the May 2024 commencement ceremony, surprising graduating students by giving each of them $1,000 in cash onstage, asking that they keep half and donate the other half.

== Campuses ==
=== Main campus ===
Located approximately 60 miles (97 km) south of Downtown Boston

- 285 Old Westport Road, Dartmouth, MA 02747–2300

=== Satellite campuses and initiatives ===
Dartmouth, Massachusetts

- School of Law

New Bedford, Massachusetts

- Professional and Continuing Education (PCE)
- School for Marine Science & Technology (SMAST)

Fall River, Massachusetts

- Center for Innovation & Entrepreneurship
Views of the Main Campus
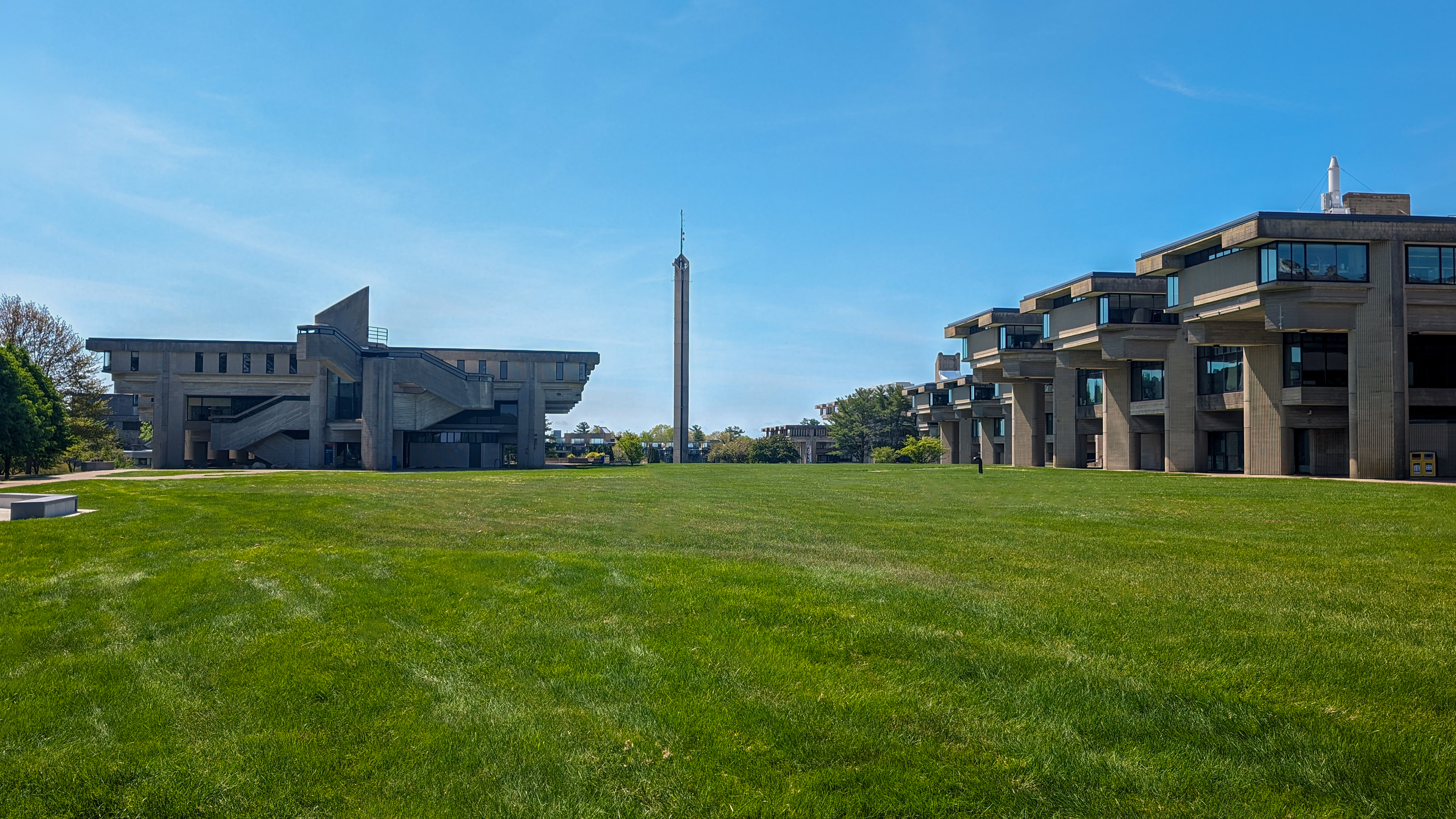
Head of Campus

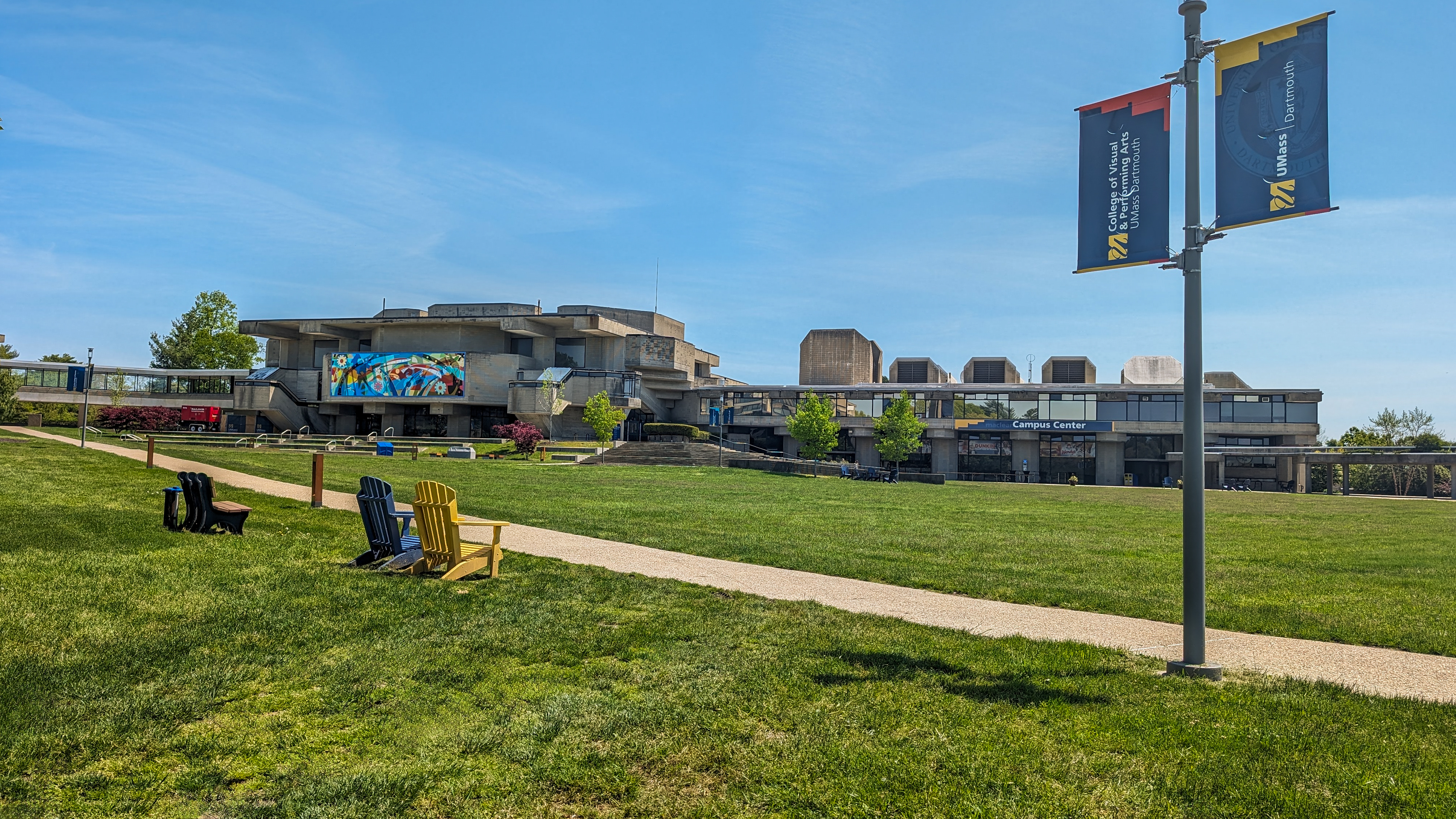
Campus Quad

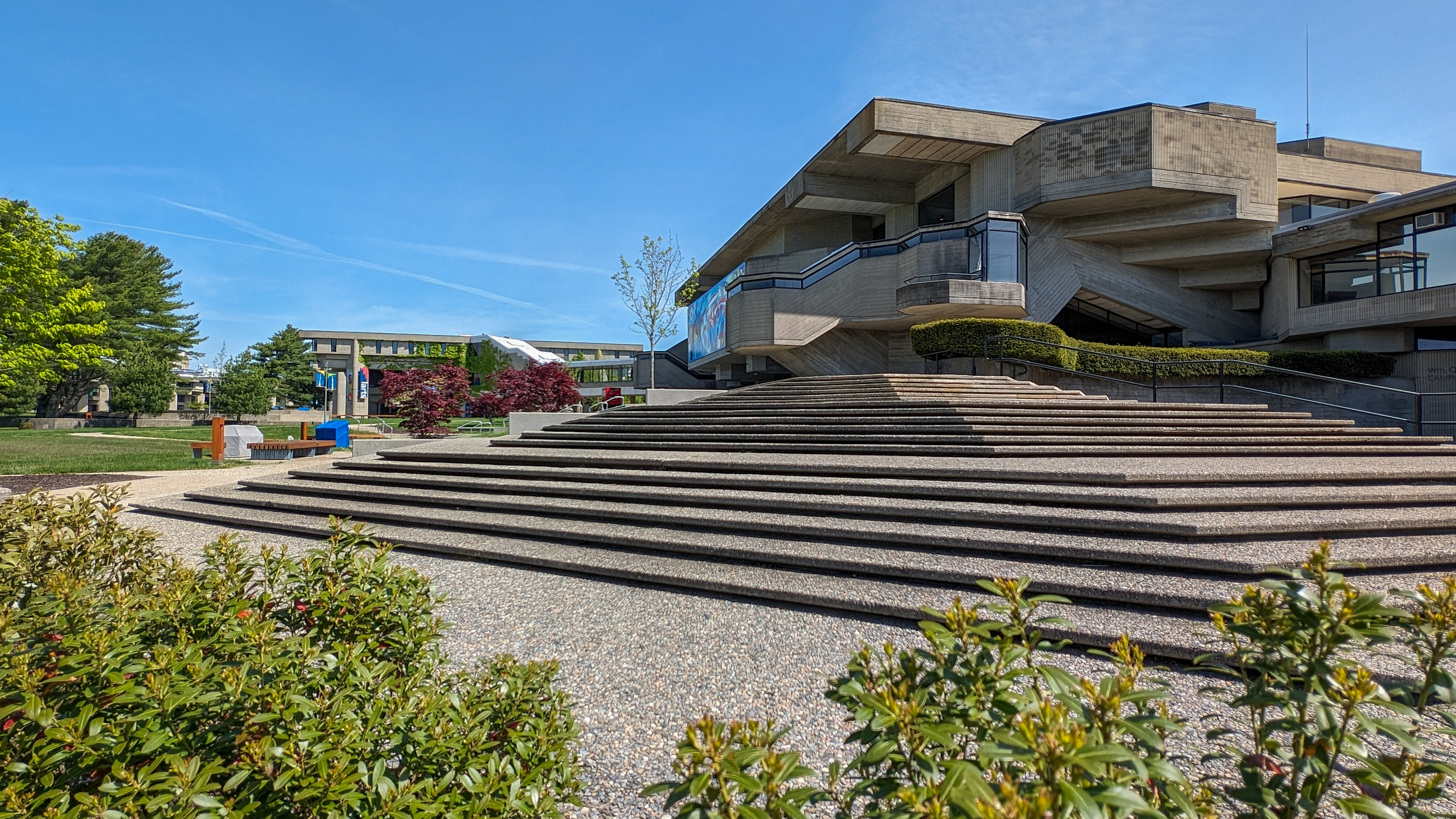
MacLean Campus Center - North Side

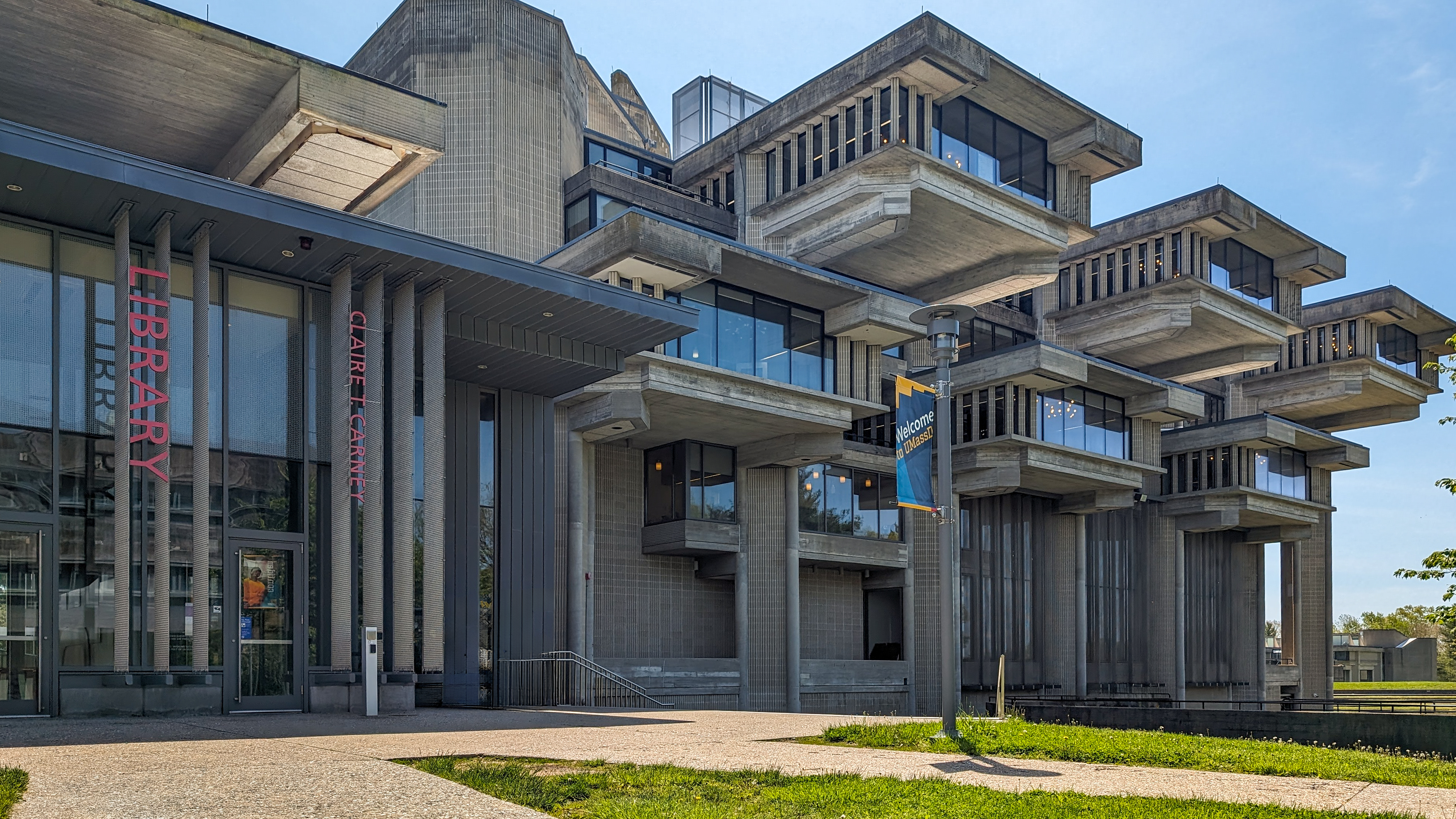
Claire T. Carney Library - West Side

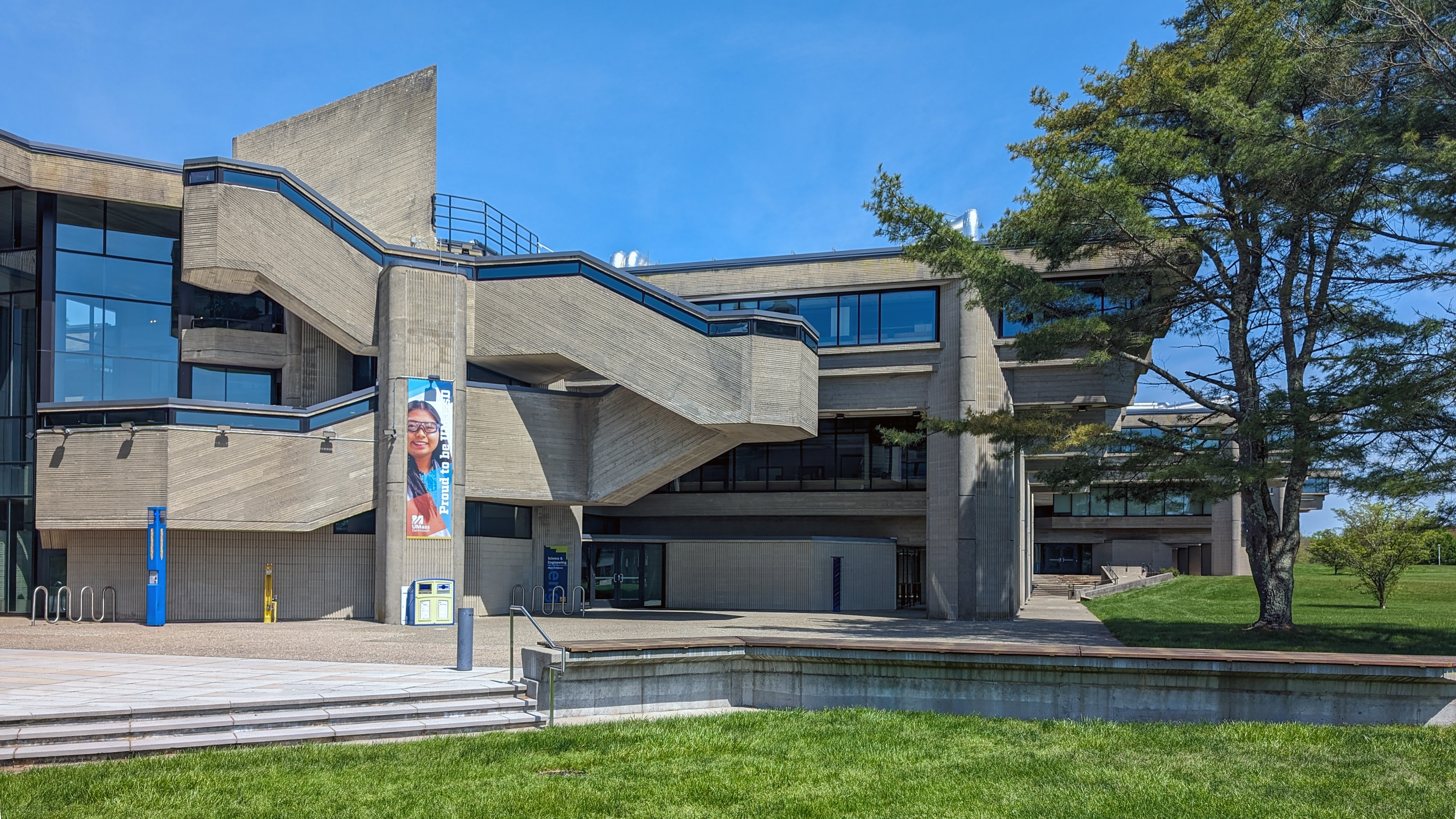
Science and Engineering Building - South Side

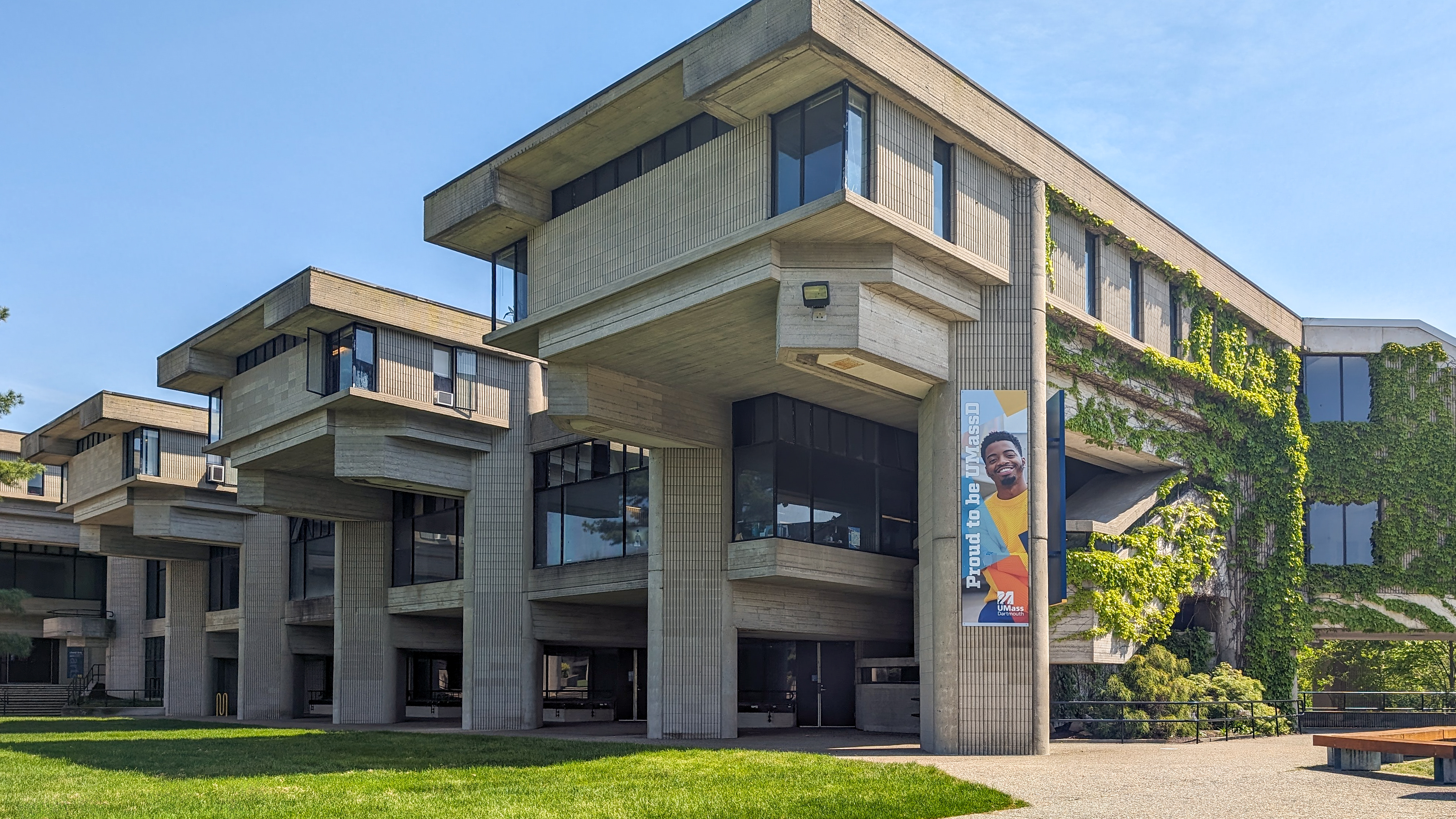
Liberal Arts Building - South Side

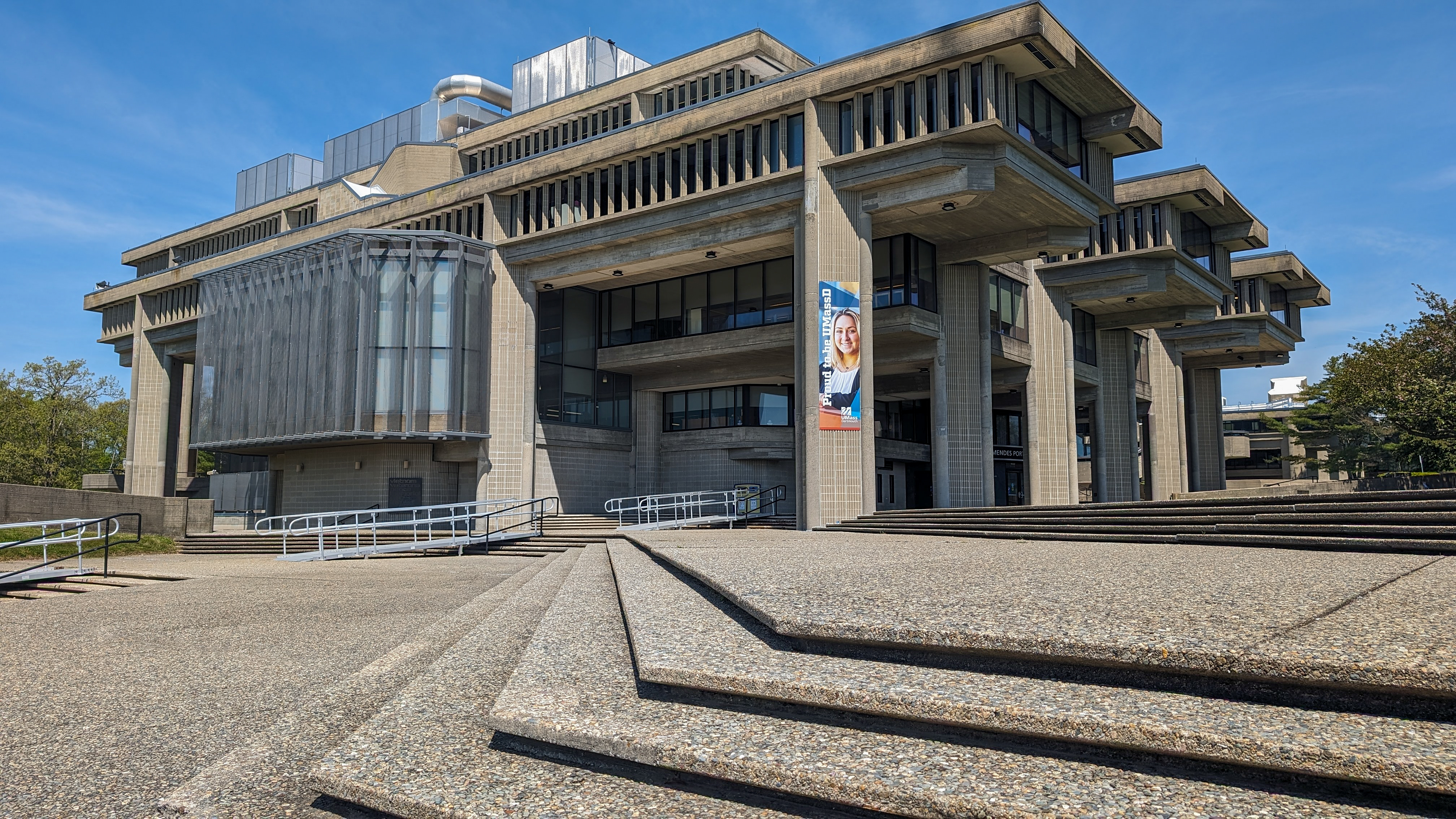
Claire T. Carney Library - South Side

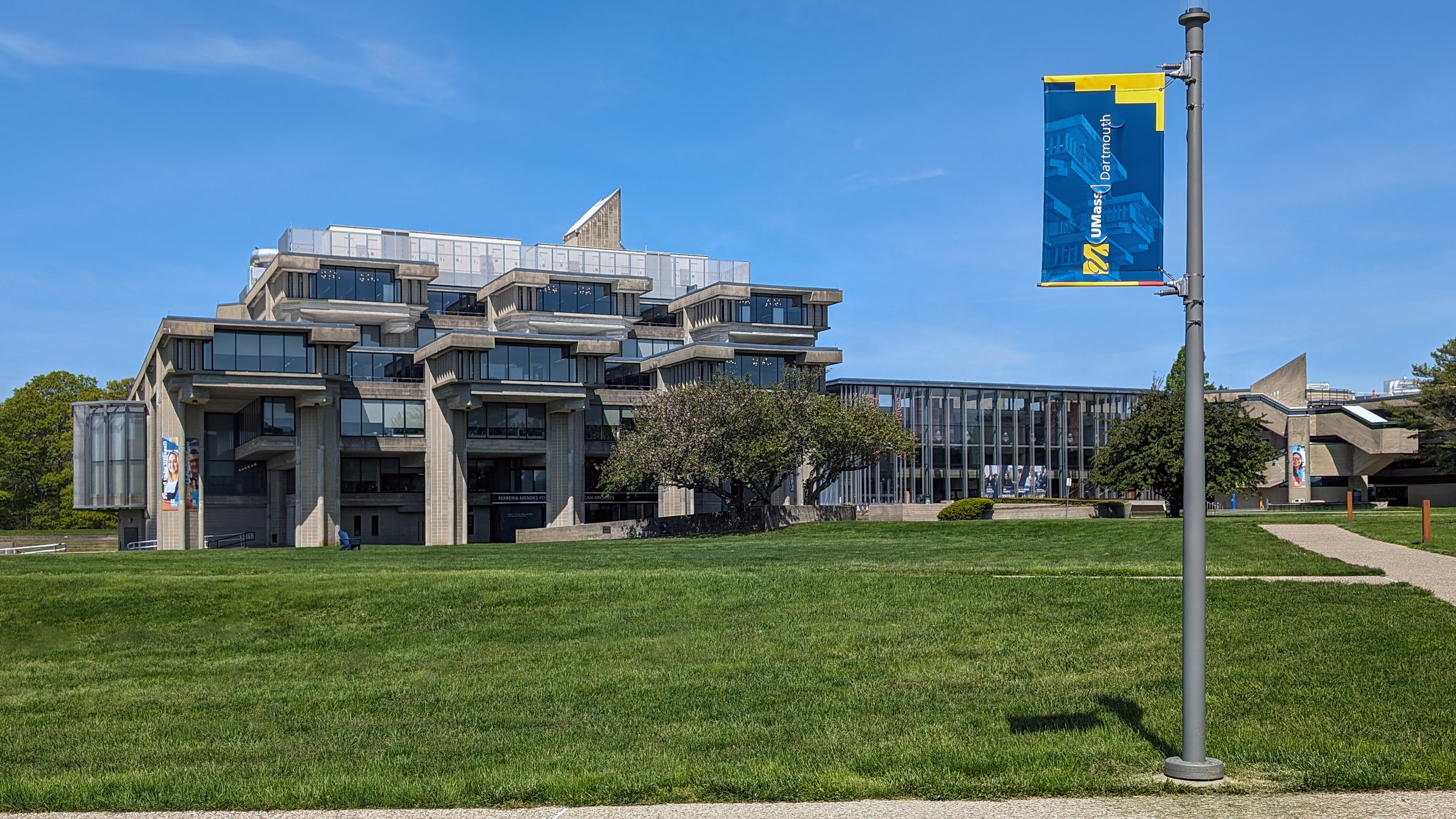
Claire T. Carney Library - East Side

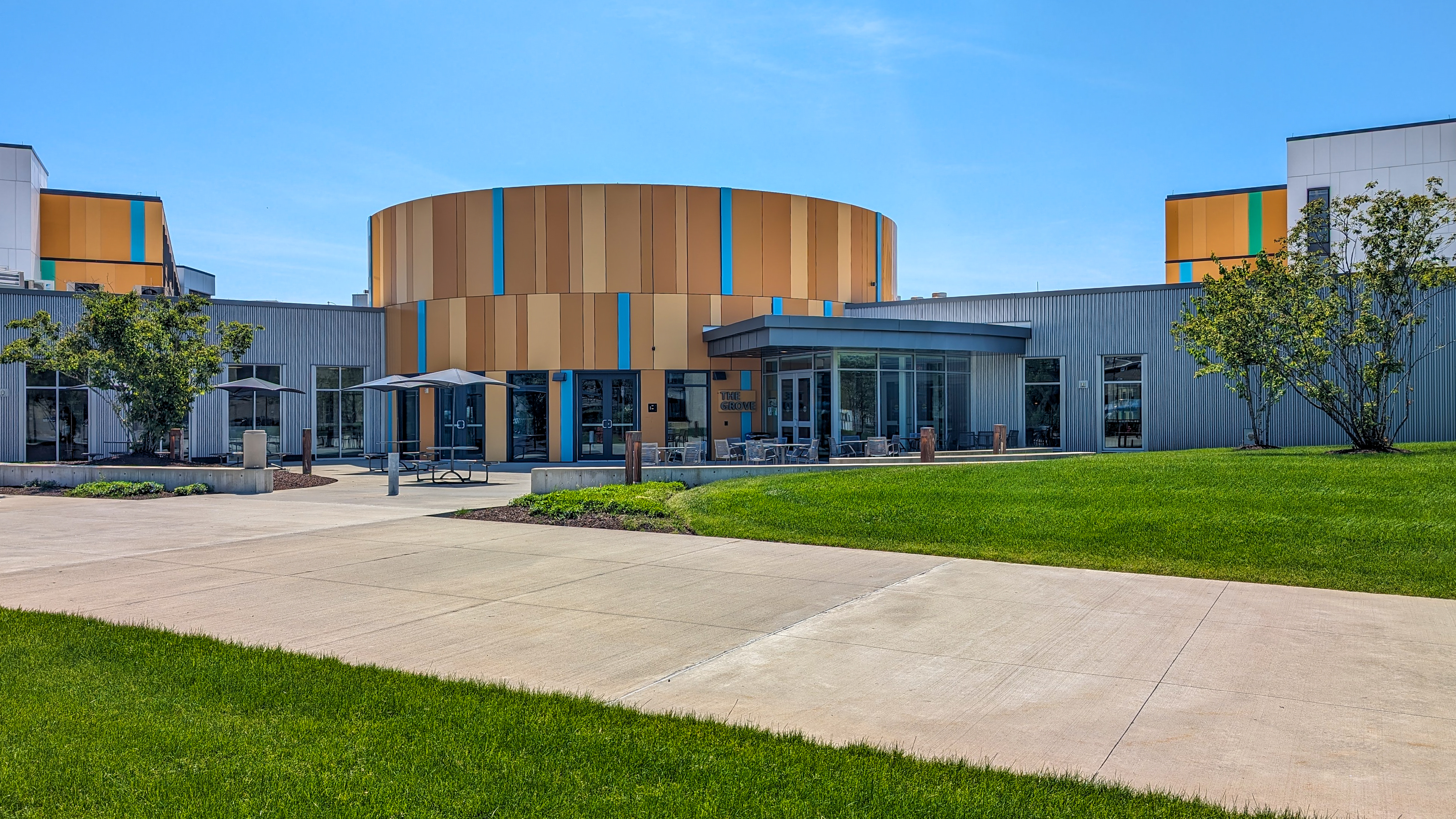
The Grove

== College of Nursing and Health Sciences ==
The College of Nursing and Health Sciences offers five undergraduate Bachelor of Science degrees, two of which are offered online, and a Master of Science in nursing (MSN) degree. Programs include the Diversity Nursing Scholars Program, Doctor of Nursing Practice (DNP) program, a PhD program offered to both BS and MS, and an online certificate program for Advanced Graduate Study: Psychiatric Mental Health Nurse Practitioner. The college also offers a Global Health Minor to all majors.

The Commission on Collegiate Nursing Education (CCNE), an independent accrediting body that is officially recognized by the United States Secretary of Education, has approved UMass Dartmouth's bachelor's and master's degree programs in nursing, as well as the Doctor of Nursing Practice program. The Massachusetts Board of Regulation of Nursing has also given the nursing education curriculum Full Approval.

== Charlton College of Business ==
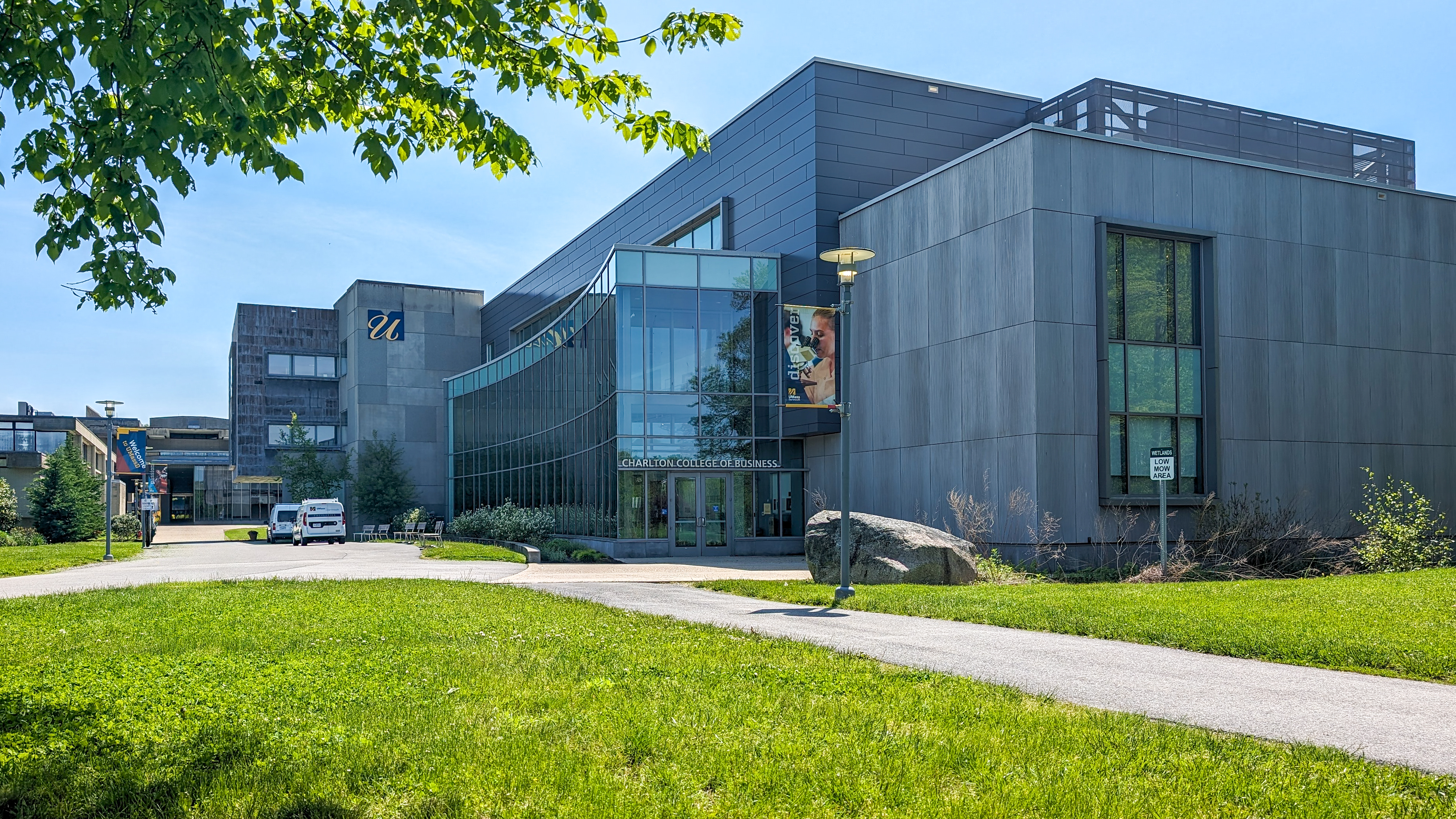
UMass Dartmouth Charlton College of Business

The Charlton College of Business at the University of Massachusetts-Dartmouth offers seven undergraduate Bachelor of Science degrees, a Master of Business Administration (MBA) degree, a Master of Science in Healthcare Management degree (both face-to-face and online), and several graduate certificates. It also offers a combined MBA/Juris Doctor (JD). There are certificate programs in Accounting, Business Foundations, Environmental Policy, Finance, International Business, Marketing, Organizational Leadership, Supply Change Management and Information Systems, and Sustainable Development.

The college is the only AACSB-accredited (Association to Advance Collegiate Schools of Business) public business school in the southeastern region of Massachusetts.

The Charlton College of Business houses multiple nationally ranked degree programs. For the 2021–2022 academic year, the online MBA program was ranked No. 51 in the nation according to U.S. News & World Report. The school's undergraduate program is nationally ranked No. 150 by U.S. News. The Princeton Review lists the Charlton College of Business as one of their best 296 business schools, while the Academic Ranking of World Universities in its Global Ranking of Academic Subjects ranks Management subjects 201–300 globally

Fortune Magazine in 2026 listed Charlton's MBA program as No.72 in the country. Additionally, QS World University Rankings ranked Charlton's Masters program in Finance No.151 in the World

== Architecture ==
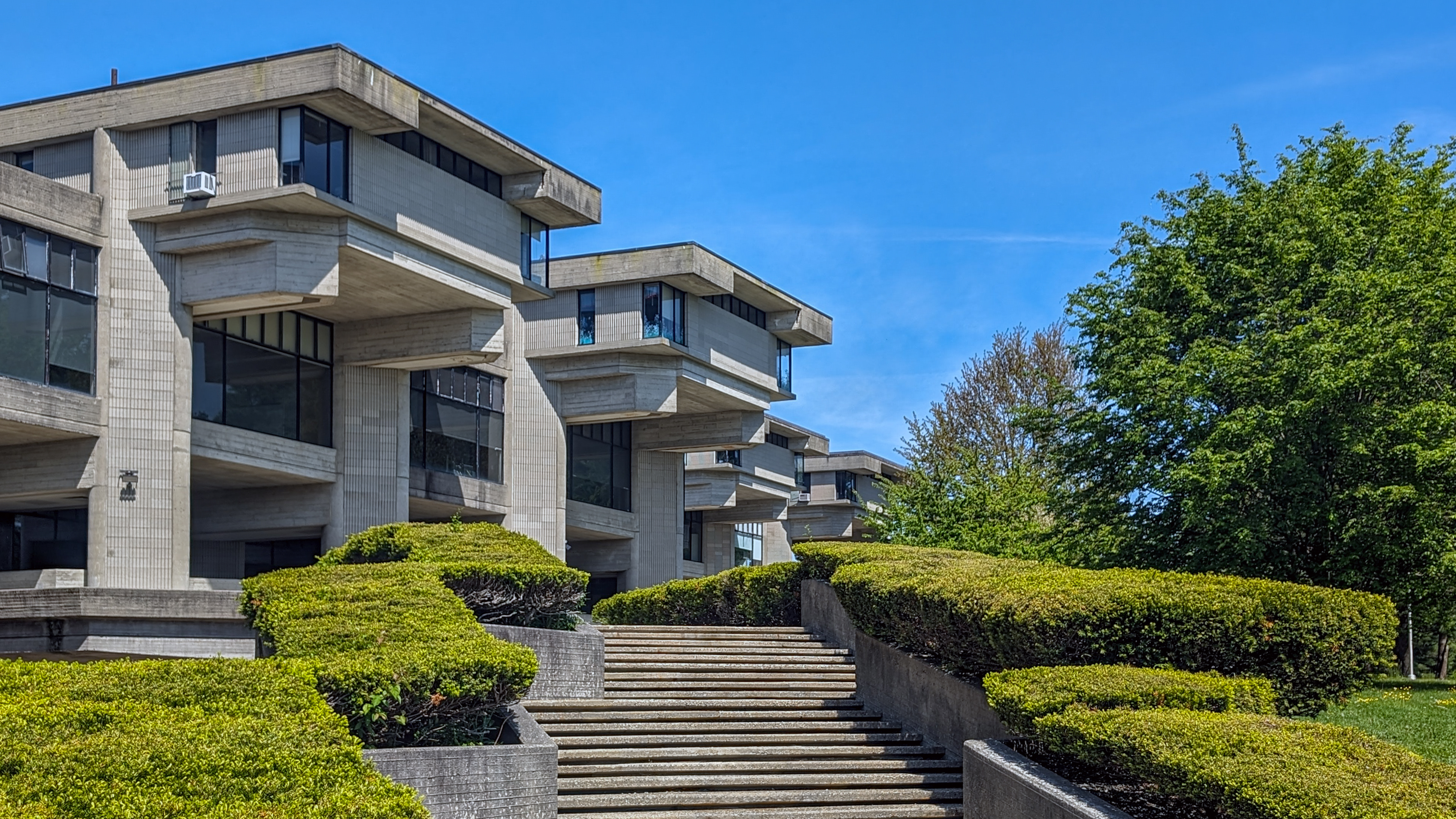
UMass Dartmouth, Liberal Arts Building - East Side

The buildings on the campus were designed by Modernist architect Paul Rudolph beginning in the early 1960s to distinguish the campus from the outside world and provide what might be considered a Social Utopian environment. The building architecture is similar to that of the Boston Government Service Center. Rudolph made both the exterior and interior of each building of rough concrete (béton brut), an essential element of the style known as Brutalism, and he endowed buildings with large windows. The stairs were made relatively short in height. Atria were also placed in the Liberal Arts and Science & Engineering buildings to give people a place to socialize between sections of the halls. These areas are also filled with hanging and potted indoor plants. The main door of each building faces towards the Robert Karam Campanile, keeping students within the academic life area, where buildings for classes are located. Large mounds of earth (berms) also stand between the parking lots, making the lots partially invisible from the original Academic Life area (though not from within some recent additions to it, such as the Charlton College of Business building). More recent buildings, most notably the Woodland Commons and residence halls south of the main campus, have been built to complement Rudolph's Late Modernist aesthetic.

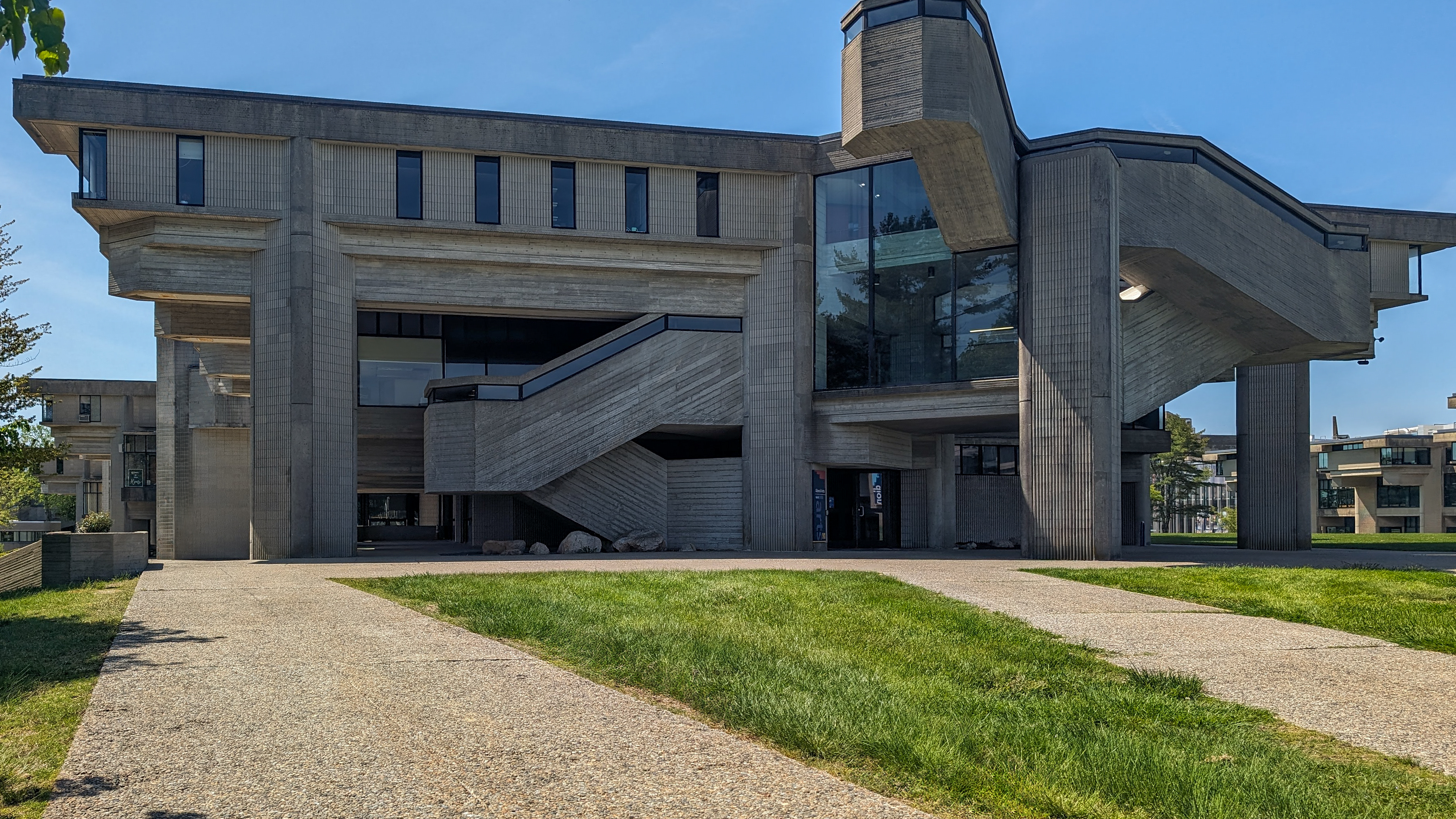
UMass Dartmouth, Liberal Arts Building - North Side

In October 2013, Travel and Leisure named the university one of the most mysterious campuses in the United States. It compared the library to a concrete spaceship, describing it as an icon of the Brutalist style of architecture that has been both beloved and derided since its construction in the 1960s.

The university has large areas of undeveloped green space with numerous footpaths, including wooded areas, grasslands, wetlands, and ponds.

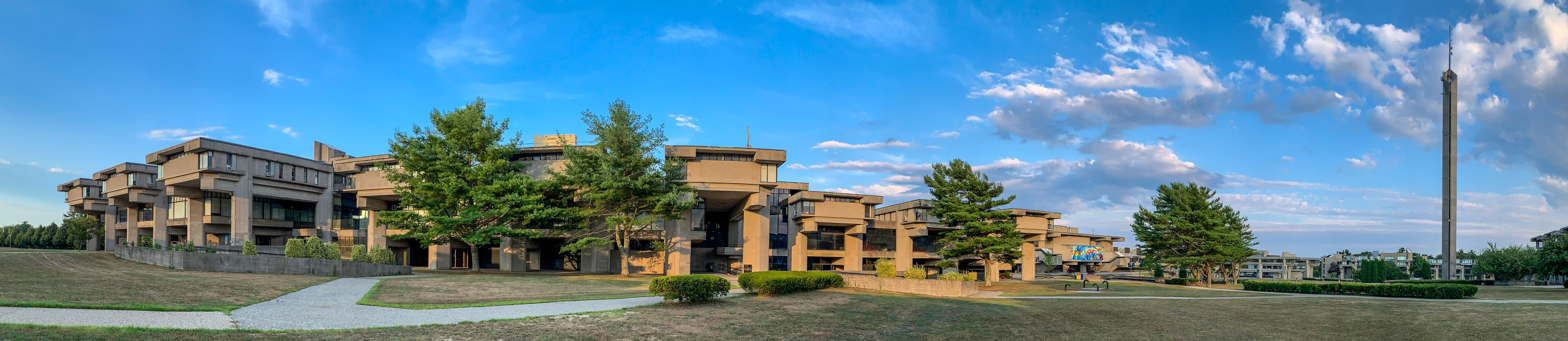
Panoramic view of the campus, highlighting Paul Rudolph's brutalist designs. Karam Campanile at far right.

== Claire T. Carney Library ==
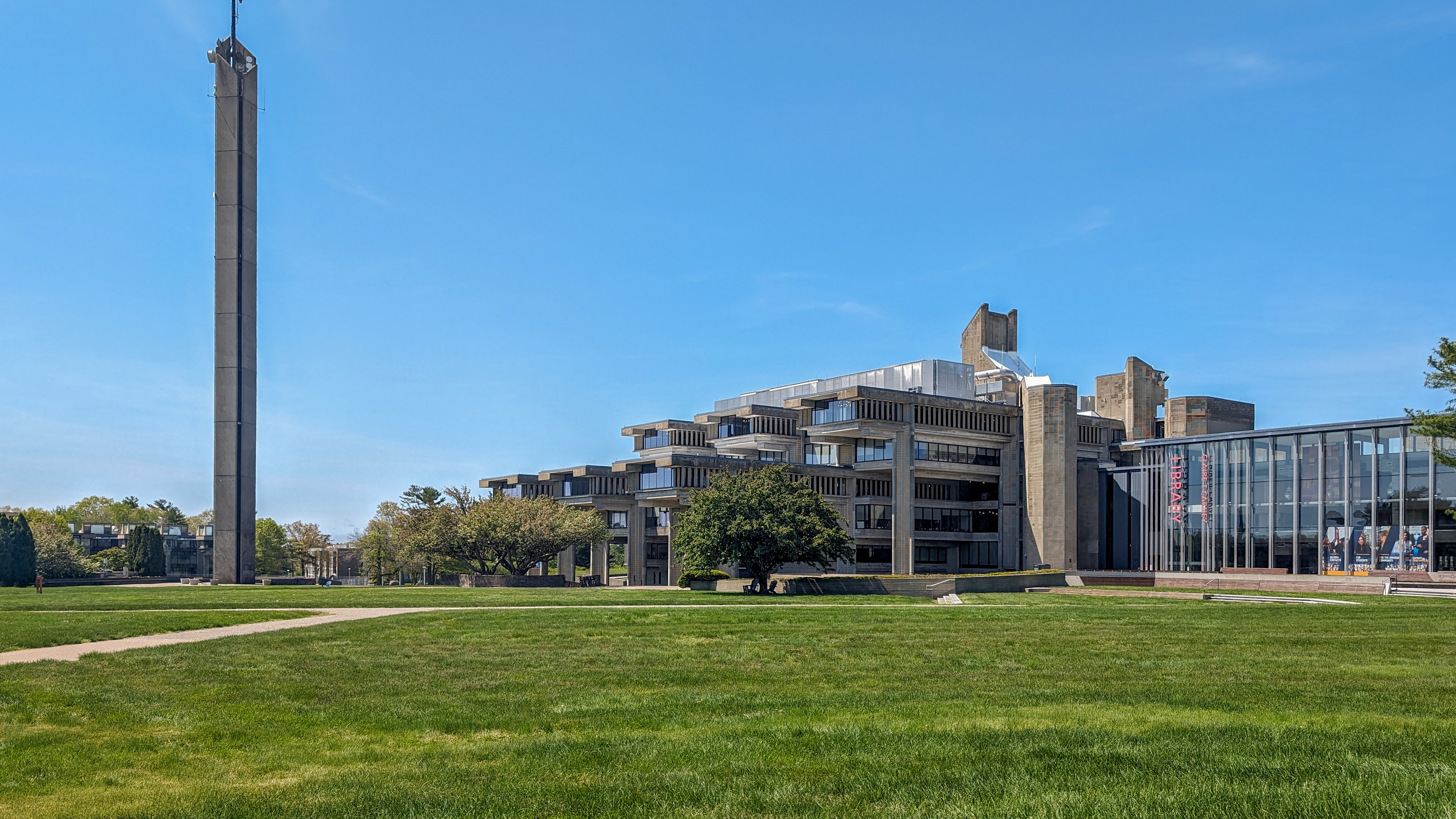
Claire T. Carney Library

=== Archives & Special Collections ===
The Archives & Special Collections preserves historical records, publications and graduate theses of the University of Massachusetts Dartmouth (University Records) as well as personal and professional papers of faculty, staff, students and selected individuals and organizations from the surrounding communities of southeastern Massachusetts (Manuscript Collections).

=== Robert F. Kennedy Assassination Archives ===
The world's largest, most complete compilation of materials relating to the assassination of Robert F. Kennedy. Established in 1984, the archives contains thousands of copies of government documents obtained through the Freedom of Information Act public disclosure process as well as manuscripts, photographs, audiotape interviews, video tapes, news clippings and research notes compiled by journalists and other private citizens who have investigated discrepancies in the case.

=== Ferreira-Mendes Portuguese American Archives ===
Records of fraternal, religious and social organizations; family photographs, scrapbooks and oral histories which illustrate the collective experience of immigration, settlement, and life in the United States; the records of prominent individuals of Portuguese descent; and records of local business and other institutions that either serve or were created by Portuguese-Americans.

=== Paul Rudolph & His Architecture ===
This featured section of the Claire T. Carney website is a comprehensive reference resource for the architect and his designs, with particular emphasis on SMTI / UMass Dartmouth. It provides a comprehensive bibliography of the works, writings, and life of the architect, complete with supporting images, documents, and media.

== Student life ==
Undergraduate demographics as of Fall 2023
Race and ethnicity	Total
White	56%
Black	18%
Hispanic	13%
Two or more races	5%
Asian	3%
Unknown	2%
International student	1%
Economic diversity
Low-income (Note: The percentage of students who received an income-based federal Pell grant intended for low-income students.)	38%
Affluent (Note: The percentage of students who are a part of the American middle class at the bare minimum.)	62%

=== Student organizations ===
The Student Government Association, which is controlled by 34 seats, is a student-run group that handles all student activity fees and disperses them to the various clubs and organizations. There are over 160 student clubs and organizations, 11 intramural sports teams/organizations, and a full-service, public radio spectrum campus radio station, WUMD 89.3, broadcasting at 9,600 watts.

=== Housing and residential education ===
==== General information ====
On-campus living provides three different residence options:

- Traditional Residence Halls
- Apartments
- Townhouses

Each hall is staffed by a professional Resident Director, and 8–14 student Resident Assistants. Each Hall also features a Hall Council which plans events, holds elections, and engages with the larger residential population through Resident Student Association (a student-government organization for all residential students).

=== Transportation ===
On-campus transportation is provided by the university, which includes a campus-loop shuttle that makes several stops across the main campus, shuttle services to nearby stores and businesses, and shuttle services from the main campus to the satellite campuses. The university also manages a "safe-rides" program, which offers on-request shuttle services across the campus for students after the shuttle stops operating, and "safe-walk" services which offers a campus police officer to escort students when the safe-ride shuttle stops. Zipcar and bus charters are also offered on campus, and taxi services are available nearby.

The shuttle stop outside the campus center also serves as a stop for the Southeastern Regional Transit Authority, which provides public bus services to New Bedford and Fall River at no cost to students. Daily bus service to Taunton and Boston is also offered via DATTCO buses.

== Athletics ==
UMass Dartmouth athletics wordmark

UMass Dartmouth athletic teams, known by their nickname, the Corsairs, compete in a variety of sports. Men and women compete in NCAA Division III. The men's sports include baseball, basketball, cross country, football, ice hockey, soccer, and track and field. The women's sports are basketball, cross country, field hockey, lacrosse, soccer, swimming, softball, tennis, track and field, and volleyball. Most of the teams compete in the Little East Conference, while the men's ice hockey and football teams compete in the Massachusetts State Collegiate Athletic Conference.

In the midst of the coronavirus pandemic, UMass Dartmouth cut eight athletic teams to redirect funding to the remaining 17 programs. The discontinued sports were men's lacrosse, women's equestrian, men's golf, co-ed sailing, men's and women's swimming and diving, and men's and women's tennis. After "a review of the athletics program’s overall strategy as it relates to Title IX and the proportionality test", women's swimming and women's tennis were re-established a short time later.

== Rankings and recognition ==
Academic rankings

National
- U.S. News & World Report: 242 (tie)
- Washington Monthly: 169
- WSJ/College Pulse: 501-600

Global
- U.S. News & World Report: 1279 (tie)

In 2016, the University of Massachusetts Dartmouth received its new designated status from Carnegie Classification of Institutions of Higher Education as "Doctoral University: Higher research activity". In the 2020 college ranking published by The Wall Street Journal and Times Higher Education, UMass Dartmouth was featured among top 800 of all public and private higher education institutions in the country, while Business Insider listed the university in 2014 among its 600 "Smartest Colleges in America" based on ACT and SAT scores of the entering students. The Princeton Review lists the university among their most 361 "Green Colleges" of the country. UMass Dartmouth is accredited by the New England Commission of Higher Education.

Other rankings and recognition:

- In 2017, the university ranked #204 by PayScale by salary potential for 2016–2017.
- In 2019, the university ranked #76 in "Best Online Graduate Business Programs (Excluding MBA)", #41-#51 in "Best Online Graduate Computer Information Technology Programs" and #132-#170 in "Best Online Graduate Nursing Programs" by U.S. News & World Report.
- In 2019, the university ranked #7 in College Gazette's top 10 "hidden gem" public universities in the United States.
- In 2021, the university ranked #217 in "Best National Universities", #76 in "Top Performers on Social Mobility", #109 in "Top Public Schools", and #145 in "Best Undergraduate Engineering Programs".
- In 2021, Academic Ranking of World Universities listed academic subject in Oceanography as 76–100 globally.
- In 2024, U.S. News and World Report ranked the school #209 in national universities, #112 in top public schools, and #196 in best value schools.
- In 2025, U.S. News and World Report ranked the school #244 in national universities, #135 in top public schools, #139 for Engineering, #74 for Nursing, #126 for Computer Science, #147 for Business programs, and #102 for social mobility

== Notable alumni ==
- Kevin Aguiar, politician who represented the 7th Bristol district in the Massachusetts House of Representatives
- Steven Baddour, attorney and politician from the Commonwealth of Massachusetts
- Antonio F. D. Cabral (B.A. 1978), member of the Massachusetts House of Representatives 1990–present
- Robert Correia (B.S. 1962), member of the Massachusetts House of Representatives 1976–2008, mayor of Fall River 2008–09
- Charles A. Dewey, United States federal judge in Iowa's southern district
- Scott Ferson, President Liberty Square Group
- Bruce Gray (B.F.A. 1983), sculptor
- Pooch Hall, actor
- Brian Helgeland, Academy Award-winning screenwriter
- Marques Houtman, Cape Verdean American basketball point guard
- Elizabeth James-Perry, American artist and restoration ecologist
- Robert Koczera, member of the Massachusetts House of Representatives for the 11th Bristol district; former member of the New Bedford City Council
- Edward M. Lambert, Jr., commissioner of the Massachusetts Department of Conservation and Recreation
- Gerald A. LeBlanc, professor emeritus in the Department of Biological Sciences at the North Carolina State University
- Sheri McCoy, CEO Avon Products, former executive at Johnson & Johnson
- Lawrence G. McDonald, former vice president at Lehman Brothers; author
- Mark C. Montigny (B.A.), member of the Massachusetts Senate 1993–present
- David Nyzio (BFA, 1982), artist
- Jim Perdue (M.S.), chicken industry executive
- Susan Mohl Powers (M.F.A.), artist
- Joe Proctor (attended), professional mixed martial artist, won the RF & AFO Lightweight Titles, current UFC Lightweight
- John F. Quinn, American politician, who represented 9th Bristol District in the Massachusetts House of Representatives from 1992 to 2011
- William Rhodes (M.F.A. 1994), sculptor and mixed-media artist
- Michael Rodrigues, Democratic member of the Massachusetts Senate
- Craig Rousseau (B.A. 1993, B.A. 1994), comic book artist and co-creator of The Perhapanauts
- Bonnie Seeman, ceramic artist and University of Miami art professor
- Seabury Stanton, chairman of Berkshire Hathaway, prior to its takeover by Warren Buffett, attended the New Bedford Institute of Technology
- David B. Sullivan (B.A. 1979), member of the Massachusetts House of Representatives 1997–2013
- Jimmy Tingle, comic
- Scott D. Tingle, NASA astronaut
- Philip Travis, politician who represented the 4th Bristol District in the Massachusetts House of Representatives 1983–2007
- Dzhokhar Tsarnaev, convicted and sentenced to death for the 2013 Boston Marathon bombing
- Leah Van Dale, fitness model and professional wrestler currently signed to WWE under the ring name Carmella
- Gregory Yob, computer game designer
