= Southern New England School of Law =

Coordinates: 41°39′40.67″N 70°59′17.26″W

- Active: 1981–2010
- Location: North Dartmouth, Massachusetts, US

Southern New England School of Law (SNESL) was a non-profit law school located in North Dartmouth, Massachusetts that operated from 1981 to 2010. At its closure, its assets were donated to the University of Massachusetts system to become the basis for the University of Massachusetts School of Law.

== Location ==
The law school was located in North Dartmouth, Massachusetts, between New Bedford, Massachusetts and Fall River, Massachusetts.

== History ==
The founder of what later became Southern New England School of Law was Alfred Avins who had experience as an attorney, law professor and law school administrator. It was founded as the Southeastern Massachusetts-Rhode Island-Avins Law School was incorporated in 1981, offering weekend classes from a storefront location in Fall River. It adopted the name "Southern New England School of Law" in 1986 and won authorization to confer the Juris Doctor degree in 1988. The first graduation was held in 1989. A full-time day program was established in 1992, and the School moved to its Faunce Corner Road campus in North Dartmouth in 1994. It became accredited by the New England Association of Schools and Colleges in 1995. At its closure in 2010, it had 200 students, 1200 alumni, 13 full-time faculty and over 20 adjunct instructors.

=== Affiliation with University of Massachusetts ===
In 2005, the University of Massachusetts system trustees considered but rejected a proposal to create a UMass Law School by merging SNESL with UMass Dartmouth.

Prior to the school's incorporation into the University of Massachusetts system, students enrolled at Southern New England School of Law had the option of completing a dual JD/MBA program. The MBA (Business School) component was offered at the nearby University of Massachusetts Dartmouth campus. Full-time students enrolled in the joint program completed the course of study within four years or eight semesters.

Additionally, UMass Dartmouth provided Southern New England School of Law students with dormitory arrangements, access to meal services, and use of the UMASS library, bookstore, and athletic facilities.

On December 10, 2009, the Board of Trustees of the University of Massachusetts voted to have UMass Dartmouth acquire the law school from the law school trustees with the aim of creating a competitive and low cost alternative to private law schools in the area. Southern New England held its final commencement on May 29, 2010 and was succeeded by the University of Massachusetts School of Law at Dartmouth.

== Accreditation ==
SNESL was accredited by the New England Association of Schools and Colleges. It was not accredited by the American Bar Association.

Southern New England School of Law's accreditation status was the subject of a lawsuit based on SNESL's provisional accreditation that ultimately was led to a denial of full accreditation by the ABA in 1999.

== Clinical programs ==
Southern New England School of Law ran clinics offering legal services to individuals and organizations in Massachusetts on a pro bono basis. Clinics were led and organized by faculty and licensed attorneys, and allowed law students at SNESL to assist.

The Immigration Law Clinic provided legal services to immigrants and community groups throughout Massachusetts. Clients were referred by several local agencies. Other SNESL clinics included the Community Development Clinic, designed to work with local non-profit organizations; and the Legal Services Clinic, located in one of the city’s legal services offices, The New Center for Legal Advocacy, in New Bedford, Massachusetts.

== Student associations ==
The Student Bar Association served as the official student association of Southern New England School of Law. It sponsored academic, professional and social activities and brought guest speakers to the Law School. The Southern New England Roundtable Symposium Law Journal, a student organization, published an electronic law journal annually in the winter semester, "to contribute to the legal community by publishing articles that highlight current legal issues and changes in the law."

Other student organizations included Delta Theta Phi Law Fraternity, the Black Law Students Association (BLSA), the Legal Association of Women (LAW), the International Law Students Association (ILSA), the Moot Court Program, and the Yearbook.

== See also ==
- List of defunct law schools in the United States
