= Seabury Stanton =

American businessman (1892–1971)

- Born: October 9, 1892; New Bedford, Massachusetts, U.S.
- Died: October 19, 1971 (aged 79); Bristol County, Massachusetts, U.S.
- Education: Harvard University (1915)
- Occupation: Manager of Berkshire Hathaway

Seabury Stanton (October 9, 1892 – October 19, 1971) was an American businessman from New Bedford, Massachusetts who ran Berkshire Hathaway prior to its takeover by Warren Buffett in 1964.

== Biography ==
=== Early life ===
Seabury Stanton was born on October 9, 1892, in New Bedford, Massachusetts. His father and grandfather had been whaling captains in New Bedford. He attended the local schools, the New Bedford Textile School, and Harvard University, where he graduated in the class of 1915.

=== Career ===
In 1916, Stanton began work in textile manufacturing as the treasurer for the Hathaway Manufacturing Company.

The textile industry in New England declined after World War I and did not recover until after the Great Depression with the outbreak of World War II.

In 1955, Hathaway became Berkshire Hathaway after merging with Berkshire Fine Spinning Associates, becoming the largest surviving textile manufacturer in New England with 15 mills.

In the late 1950s, the industry was again in decline, facing low-cost competition from elsewhere in the United States and abroad. Stanton managed the company as president and his son Jack served as treasurer. Jack Stanton was expected to take over as president. Seabury's brother, Otis Stanton, managed sales at the company and often conflicted with his brother, eventually selling his shares to Warren Buffett after a meeting at the Wamsutta Club.

In 1962, Warren Buffett began buying shares in Berkshire Hathaway with the intention of tendering them back to the company at a profit. In 1964, Seabury Stanton verbally offered to buy back Buffett's shares for $11 1/2 apiece, a deal which Buffett accepted. When Buffett received the tender offer in writing, however, he found that Stanton had reduced his offer to $11 3/8. Buffett was so incensed by this that instead of selling his shares, he bought more, giving him control of the company and enabling him to fire Stanton.

In 1965, Stanton and his son Jack resigned.

== Personal life ==
In December 1916, Stanton married Jean Kellogg Austin.

Stanton was Chairman of the Northern Textile Association from 1959 through 1962. He also served as a Director of the association from 1944 through 1950, again from 1951 through 1959, and from 1962 through 1965.

In 1962, Stanton published a book on Berkshire, titled Berkshire Hathaway Inc.: A Saga of Courage.

Stanton died on October 19, 1971.

== Bibliography ==
- Stanton, Seabury (1962). Berkshire Hathaway Inc.: A Saga of Courage. New York: Newcomen Society in North America. ASIN B0007DUK50.
