= University of Massachusetts School of Law =

Public law school in Massachusetts, US

Coordinates: 41°39′40.67″N 70°59′17.26″W

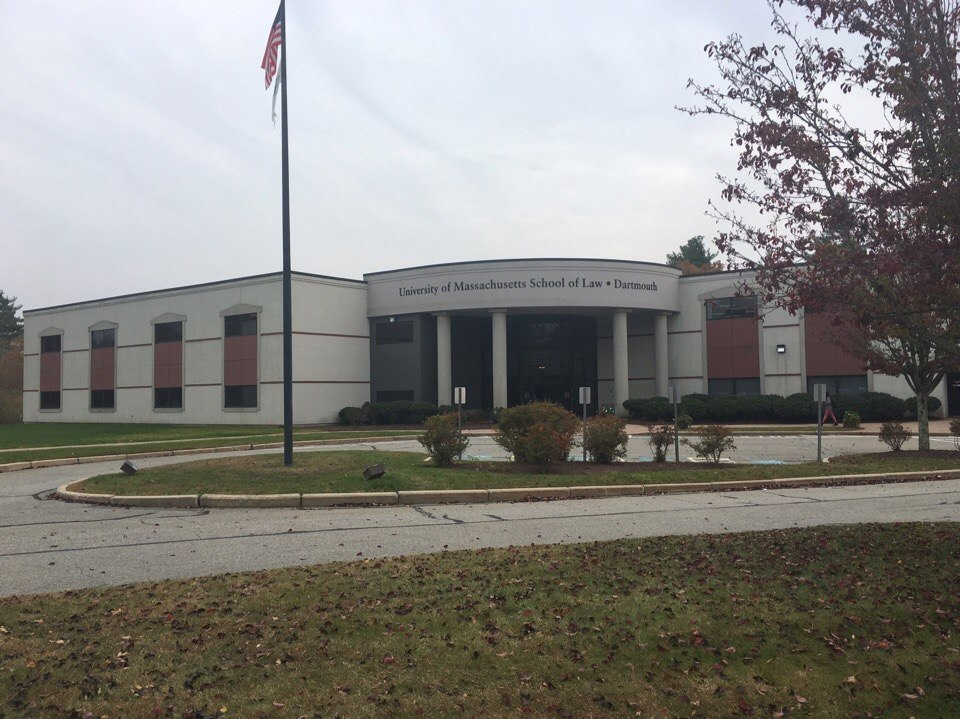
- Parent school: University of Massachusetts
- School type: Public law school
- Location: North Dartmouth, Massachusetts, U.S.
- USNWR ranking: 161st (tie) (2024)
- Website: umassd.edu/law
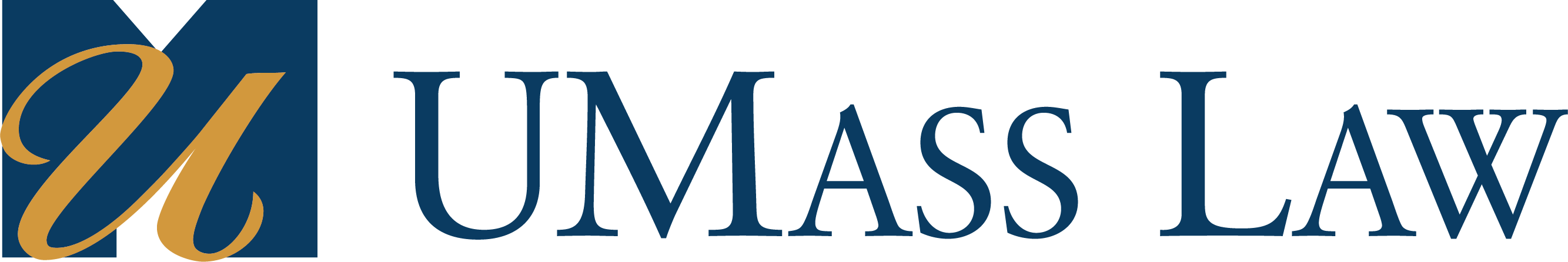

The University of Massachusetts School of Law (UMass Law) is a public law school in Dartmouth, Massachusetts. The only public law school in Massachusetts, it is the successor to Southern New England School of Law, a private law school that donated its campus and its assets to the University of Massachusetts Dartmouth. It is accredited by the American Bar Association and part of the University of Massachusetts system.

== History ==
=== Founding ===
A plan to convert private law school Southern New England School of Law (SNESL) into a public law school for the University of Massachusetts system was first proposed in early 2004. The plan would establish the first public law school in the Commonwealth of Massachusetts and only the fifth public law school in New England. The Trustees of the University of Massachusetts system voted in favor of the proposal in December 2004, but the Massachusetts Board of Higher Education rejected it in early 2005 as fiscally unsound.

The proposal was brought again in October 2009, when Southern New England School of Law offered to donate real estate, facility, technology and library assets to UMass Dartmouth for the purpose of creating a public law program in Massachusetts. These assets had an estimated value of more than $22 million and would be the second largest donation in the 146-year history of the University of Massachusetts system. The University of Massachusetts Board of Trustees approved the plan on December 9, 2009 and the Commonwealth's Board of Higher Education did likewise on February 2, 2010.

The first class matriculated in August 2010.

=== Later developments ===
In June 2012, the School of Law received provisional accreditation from the American Bar Association after an eight-year quest by SNESL and UMass Law, before receiving full accreditation in December 2016.

At a time of declining nationwide enrollment in legal education, UMass Law stabilized its enrollment at about 75 incoming students per year, with applications and the quality of applicants as measured by LSAT scores increased.

For the Fall 2022 academic year, first-year enrollment was 110 students which has increased 102% since 2016. Students at UMass Law are 100% guaranteed a clinic or internship placement.

=== Justice Bridge ===
In August, 2014, UMass Law launched Justice Bridge, a legal incubator in downtown Boston, providing reduced-fee legal services to clients of modest means. UMass Law also opened a second Justice Bridge location in New Bedford.

== Academics ==
=== Degree Programs ===
UMass Law offers full-time day, part-time day, and part-time evening/weekend Juris Doctor degree programs. Additionally, they offer JD/MBA and JD/MPP joint degrees with UMass Dartmouth and a JD/MSW joint degree with Bridgewater State University. UMass Law is accredited by the American Bar Association.

=== 3+3 Programs ===
UMass Law announced 3+3 programs, under which students can earn an undergraduate and law degree in six rather the normal seven years, with UMass Dartmouth, UMass Boston, UMass Lowell, Bridgewater State University, Fitchburg State University, Worcester State University, the Massachusetts College of Liberal Arts, Westfield State University, Framingham State University, Salem State University, Assumption University, and Anna Maria College.

=== Legal Clinics ===
UMass Law has three in-house legal clinics— Community Development (business), Human Rights at Home, and Immigration Litigation—as well as the Criminal Prosecution Clinic, housed in the Bristol County District Attorney's Office, and the Tribal Law Clinic, housed in the South Coastal Counties Legal Service, Inc.

=== Commonwealth Fellows Program ===
In December 2014, UMass Law launched the Commonwealth Fellows Program. Under the program, students who are Massachusetts residents or have attended a Massachusetts public college or university as an undergraduate, and who score at least 152 on the LSAT and have an undergraduate grade of point average of at least 3.0, receive an automatic scholarship of $5,000 per year.

=== Public Interest Law Fellowships ===
Up to 25 entering UMass Law students each year are awarded Public Interest Law Fellowships. The Fellowship, which includes a 50% scholarship for both tuition and fees, is designed to train students for careers in public service. Fellowship recipients commit to practice public interest law for at least four years after graduation.

== Recognitions ==
- Ranked #23 in the nation for value-added law schools in a study issued by the American Bar Foundation.
- Ranked #14 in the nation by National Jurist for preparing students for careers in government
- 2017 Public Service Award from the Massachusetts Bar Association
- Library of Congress Burton Award for one of the top 10 student law review articles nationally to UMass Law student
- Ranked among the best law schools for practical training by preLaw Magazine
- Ranked as one of the top five law schools for black students in the east by the Black Student's Guide to Law Schools & Firms

== Post-Graduation Employment Statistics ==
According to UMass Law's official 2017 ABA-required disclosures, 72% of the Class of 2018 obtained full-time, long-term, bar-required employment nine months after graduation. UMass Law's Law School Transparency under-employment score is 28.3%, indicating the percentage of the Class of 2016 unemployed, pursuing an additional degree, or working in a non-professional, short-term, or part-time job nine months after graduation.

ABA Employment Summary for 2018 Graduates
Employment Status	Percentage
Employed - Bar Passage Required	64%
Employed - J.D. Advantage	16%
Employed - Professional Position	1%
Employed - Non-Professional Position	0%
Employed - Undeterminable	0.0%
Pursuing Graduate Degree Full Time	4%
Unemployed - Start Date Deferred	0.0%
Unemployed - Not Seeking	0%
Unemployed - Seeking	14%
Employment Status Unknown	0.0%
Total of 50 Graduates

== Bar Passage Rates ==
UMass Law's July 2018 Massachusetts first-time bar passage rate was 92.6%, the third highest passage rate of the Massachusetts law schools.

The 2017 first-time bar passage rate for all jurisdictions was 72.7%, and the 2017 first-time bar passage rate for the Massachusetts Bar exam was 75.6%. UMass Law's 2015 Ultimate Bar Pass Rate (within 2 years of graduating) for all jurisdictions was 88.7%.

Massachusetts Bar Exam Passage
	First-time takers	Percent passing	Second-time takers	Percent passing	References
July 2011	27	77.8%	2	50%
February 2012	6	0%	4	75%
July 2012	20	70%	6	66.7%
February 2013	14	57.1%	5	40%
July 2013	58	72.4%	7	42.9%
February 2014	18	55.6%	13	30.4%
July 2014	45	66.7%	9	33.3%
February 2015	20	45.0%	9	44.4%
July 2015	25	60%	8	25%
February 2016	9	55.6%	13	38.5%
July 2016	36	69.4%	6	33.3%
February 2017	14	64.3%	6	66.7%
July 2017	32	75%	22	40.9%
February 2018	3	33%	5	80%
July 2018	27	92.6%	4	50%

== Costs ==
The cost of tuition, fees, and health insurance at UMass Law for the 2022-2023 academic year is $30,450 for full-time, in-state students, $39,550 for full-time, out-of-state students, and $32,450 for full-time, Rhode Island and Vermont residents. The Law School Transparency estimated debt-financed cost of attendance for three years is $162,311. Students attending part-time will be charged on a per-credit basis. For 9 credits in the part-time program, the cost is $22,906.04 per year for in-state students, $29,731.10 for out of state students and $24,406.16 for students in regional proximity.

== Speakers ==
On March 1, 2013, Attorney General Eric Holder addressed students and faculty at UMass Law about executive and legislative efforts to combat gun violence.

On May 19, 2014, Governor Deval Patrick served as the Commencement speaker for the 2014 graduating class at UMass Law. During the commencement ceremony, Governor Patrick received the Chancellor's Medal for outstanding service to the commonwealth.

On May 18, 2015, attorney and national legal analyst Rikki Klieman gave the Commencement address, telling the Class of 2015 "making a living is not the same as making a life." She received an honorary Doctor of Laws degree.

On May 16, 2016, Massachusetts Supreme Judicial Court Chief Justice Ralph D. Gants addressed the Class of 2016, telling the graduates they were "blazing the path for the entire profession of law." Chief Justice Gants received an honorary Doctor of Laws degree.

On May 15, 2017, Morris Dees, co-founder and chief legal counsel for the Southern Poverty Law Center, gave the Commencement address to the Class of 2017. Dees received an honorary Doctor of Laws degree.

On May 14, 2018, Massachusetts Attorney General Maura Healey addressed the Class of 2018 and received the Chancellor's Medal for her tireless work in Massachusetts.

On May 13, 2019, Massachusetts Supreme Judicial Court Justice Elspeth B. Cypher received an honorary Juris Doctor and addressed the Class of 2019.

== Notable people ==
=== Alumni ===
- Donald Arthur (J.D.), 35th Surgeon General of the United States Navy

== See also ==
- Southern New England School of Law, the predecessor institution
- University of Massachusetts Dartmouth
- University of Massachusetts
