= Timeline of New Bedford, Massachusetts =

Coordinates: 41.636111°N 70.934722°W

The following is a timeline of the history of New Bedford, Massachusetts, United States.

== Prior to 19th century ==
- Prior to 1602 - the Wampanoags, 'People of the Morning Light,' an Algonquian-speaking Native American group, inhabit the area from Narragansett Bay to the tip of Cape Cod and Martha's Vineyard and Nantucket
- 1602 - Bartholomew Gosnold an English privateer visits the site of New Bedford.
- 1652 - In the Dartmouth Purchase, John Winslow, William Bradford, Myles Standish, Thomas Southworth, and John Cooke purchase from Wasamequin (Massassoit) and his son Wamsutta a territory that would come to be known as Old Dartmouth, which included the current towns of Dartmouth, New Bedford, Acushnet, Fairhaven, and Westport
- ca.1665 - Influx of Quakers.
- 1760 - Village proper established.
- 1778 - September - Grey's raid by the British against American coastal communities.
- 1787 - Town incorporated.
- 1792
  - The Medley newspaper begins publication.
  - Post office in operation.
- 1796 - New Bedford and Fairhaven Bridge Company incorporated.
- 1797
  - first Clarks Point Light built.
  - Population: 3,313.
- 1798 - Columbian Courier newspaper begins publication.

== 19th century ==
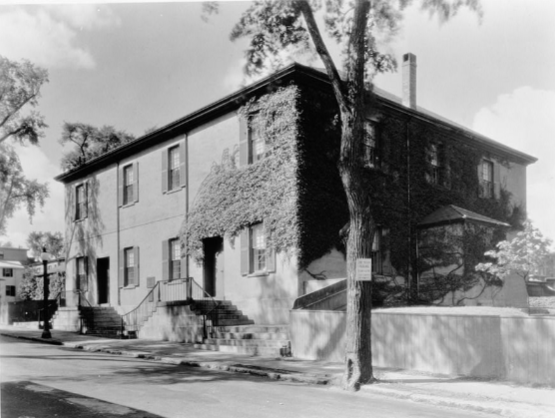
Friends Meeting House, New Bedford

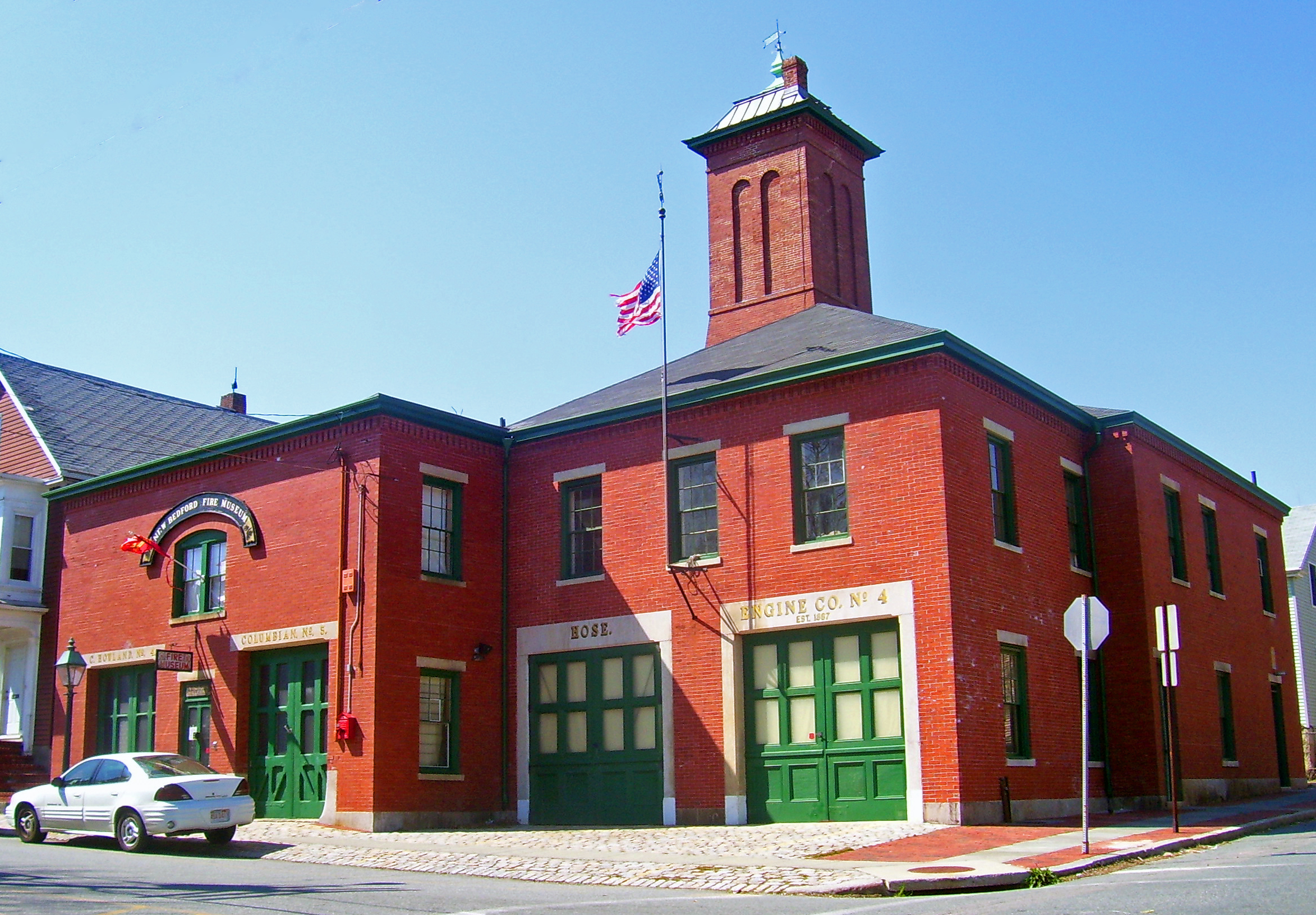
New Bedford Fire Museum

- 1800 - Population: 4,361.
- 1803 - Social Library organized.
- 1804 - 59 whaling vessels were registered from New Bedford.
- 1807 - New-Bedford Mercury newspaper begins publication.
- 1808 - Old Colony Gazette begins publication.
- 1812
  - Fairhaven separates from New Bedford.
  - Friends' Academy incorporated.
- 1816 - Bedford Commercial Bank incorporated.
- 1822 - New Bedford Meeting House built.
- 1825 - Merchants Bank incorporated.
- 1828 - Lyceum founded.
- 1829
  - Ash Street Jail built.
  - First Baptist Church built.
- late 1820's - Abolitionism in New Bedford, Massachusetts voiced by Quakers.
- 1830
  - New Bedford Port Society formed.
  - Population: 7,592.
- 1831
  - New-Bedford Weekly Register begins publication.
  - Dorcas Society organized.
- 1832 - Seamen's Bethel built.
- 1833 - Mechanics Association founded.
- 1834 - United States Customhouse and Rotch house (residence) built.
- 1837 - New Bedford Rural Cemetery incorporated.
- 1838
  - September: Frederick Douglass moves to New Bedford.
  - New Bedford and Taunton Rail Road incorporated.
- 1840 - Population: 12,087.
- 1841 - Charles W. Morgan (ship) built.
- 1843
  - Whalemen's Shipping List, and Merchant's Transcript begins publication.
  - Orphans Home incorporated.
- 1846 - Wamsutta Mills incorporated.
- 1847
  - City incorporated.
  - Abraham H. Howland becomes mayor.
  - Horticultural Society incorporated.
  - Joseph Grinnell built the first cotton mill.
- 1848 - Beginning of Arctic Whaling.
- 1849
  - J. & W. R. Wing Company in business.
  - Palmer Island Light built.
- 1850
  - Daily Evening Standard newspaper begins publication.
  - Population: 16,443.
- 1853
  - Rodney French becomes 3rd Mayor of New Bedford.
  - Municipal public library established.
  - New Bedford Institute for Savings built.
- 1855 - New Bedford Five Cents Savings Bank incorporated.
- 1861 - Fort Rodman a.k.a. Fort Taber, built at Clark's Point.
- 1866
  - Hathaway & Soule in business.
  - Wamsutta Club founded.
  - Hutchinson's Circulating Library in business.
- 1867 - Fire Station no.4 built, now houses New Bedford Fire Museum.
- 1871
  - St. John the Baptist Church founded.
  - Whaling disaster of 1871
- 1877 - Church of the Sacred Heart built.
- 1884 - St. Luke's Hospital founded.
- 1888 - Fairhaven Bridge Light built.
- 1890 - Population: 40,733.
- 1891 - Charles S. Ashley becomes mayor.
- 1892 - Club of French Sharpshooters, a benevolent and fraternal organization founded by 80 French Canadian residents of the North End, founded.
- 1894 - Buttonwood Park Zoo opens.
- 1895
  - St. Anthony of Padua Church founded.
  - New Bedford Textile School founded.
- 1899
  - New Bedford – Fairhaven Bridge constructed.
  - Union Baptist Church built.
- 1900 - Population: 62,442.

== 20th century ==
- 1901 - Hotel Waverly built.
- 1903
  - Old Dartmouth Historical Society founded.
  - New Bedford Whaling Museum established.
  - Insect invasion.
- 1905 - Our Lady of Perpetual Help Parish established.
- 1906 - Completion of harbour improvements.
- 1908 - St. Anthony of Padua Church built.
- 1910
  - Population: 96,652.
  - Local 147 of the National Industrial Union of Textile Workers (IWW) declares a strike against increases in work.
- 1912 - Orpheum Theatre opens.
- 1916 - Whaling Museum opens.
- 1919 - Alvorada Jornal Diario newspaper begins publication.
- 1920 - Population: 121,217.
- 1923 - April 2: The Zeiterion theatre opens
- 1927 - St. Casimir Parish established.
- 1942 - Airport built.
- 1946 - Your Theatre founded.
- 1958 - Northeast Airlines Flight 285 crashes at New Bedford Airport.
- 1962 - Waterfront Historic Area League organized.
- 1970
  - Club of French Sharpshooters, a French Canadian benevolent and fraternal organization, disbands
  - Racial unrest.
- 1972
  - New Bedford High School established.
  - John A. Markey becomes mayor.
  - New Bedford Historical Commission established.
  - Sister city relationship established with Horta, Azores.
- 1976 - New Bedford Fire Museum opens.
- 1977 - Greater New Bedford Regional Vocational-Technical High School established.
- 1985 - A labor strike breaks out between fishermen and a trade association of shipowners.
- 1987 - Sister city relationship established with Tosashimizu, Japan.
- 1988-89 - New Bedford Highway Killer active
- 1996
  - Multi-stage folk festival begins at the State Pier; this event evolves into Summerfest, then New Bedford Folk Festival
  - New Bedford Whaling National Historical Park and New Bedford Historical Society established.
  - City website online (approximate date).
- 1997
  - Azorean Maritime Heritage Society organized.
  - New Bedford Bay Sox baseball team formed.

== 21st century ==
- 2003 - Coast Guard Station New Bedford closes.
- 2006 - Scott W. Lang becomes mayor.
- 2010
  - Population: 95,072.
  - New Bedford Museum of Glass opens.
- 2012 - Jonathan F. Mitchell becomes mayor.
- 2015 - Marine Commerce Terminal begins operating.

== See also ==
- New Bedford history
- List of mayors of New Bedford, Massachusetts
- National Register of Historic Places listings in New Bedford, Massachusetts
- Timelines of other municipalities in the Greater Boston area of Massachusetts: Boston, Cambridge, Haverhill, Lawrence, Lowell, Lynn, Salem, Somerville, Waltham, Worcester

== Bibliography ==
- Jedidiah Morse (1797), "New Bedford", American Gazetteer, Boston: At the presses of S. Hall, and Thomas & Andrews
- Henry Howland Crapo (1836), The New-Bedford directory ... and the town register ... Also, a list of whale ships, belonging to the United States, New Bedford, Mass.: J.C. Parmenter, printer, OCLC 35857446, OL 14030423M
- New Bedford Directory. New Bedford, Mass.: C. & A. Taber. 1849.
- Herman Melville (1851), "Chapter 6", Moby-Dick, Harper & Brothers (novelist's description of New Bedford)
- New Bedford Directory. New Bedford, Mass.: Charles Taber & Co. 1852.
- New Bedford Directory. New Bedford, Mass.: Charles Taber & Co. 1859.
- Directory ... City of New Bedford, for 1871-2. Boston: Greenough, Jones & Co. 1871.
- Directory ... City of New Bedford, for 1873-4. Boston: Greenough, Jones & Co. 1873.
- Elias Nason (1874), "New Bedford", Gazetteer of the State of Massachusetts, Boston: B.B. Russell, OCLC 1728892
- Directory ... City of New Bedford, for 1875-6. Boston: Greenough, Jones & Co. 1875.
- Directory ... City of New Bedford, for 1879-80. Boston: Greenough, Jones & Co. 1879.
- Joseph Sabin, ed. (1881). "New Bedford, Mass.". Bibliotheca Americana. Vol. 13. New York. OCLC 13972268.
- Robert Grieve (1889), "Nantucket", Illustrated Martha's Vineyard, Nantucket, Taunton, New Bedford, Fall River (2nd ed.), Providence, RI: J.A. & R.A. Reid, OCLC 10563002
- New Bedford and Fairhaven Directory: 1897. Boston: W.A. Greenough & Co. 1897.
- "New Bedford" . Encyclopædia Britannica. Vol. 19 (11th ed.). 1910.

== Images ==
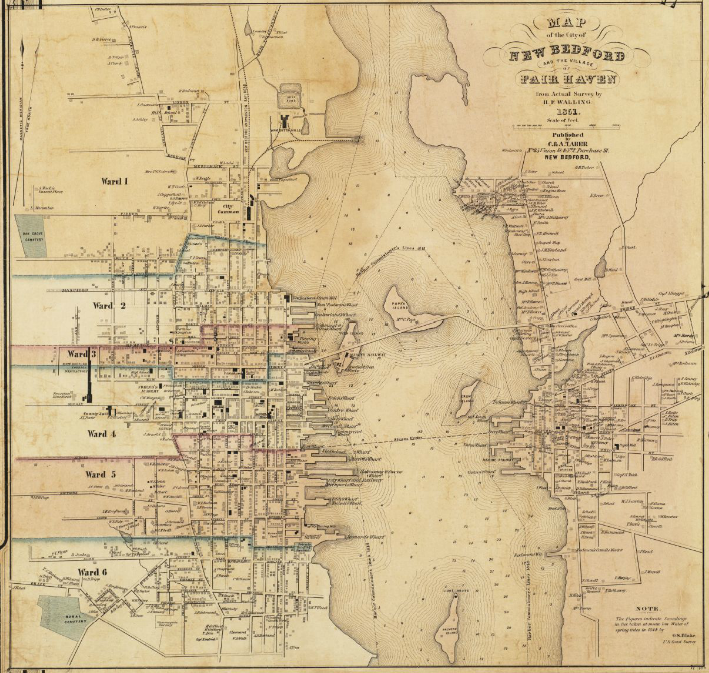
Map of New Bedford, 1851

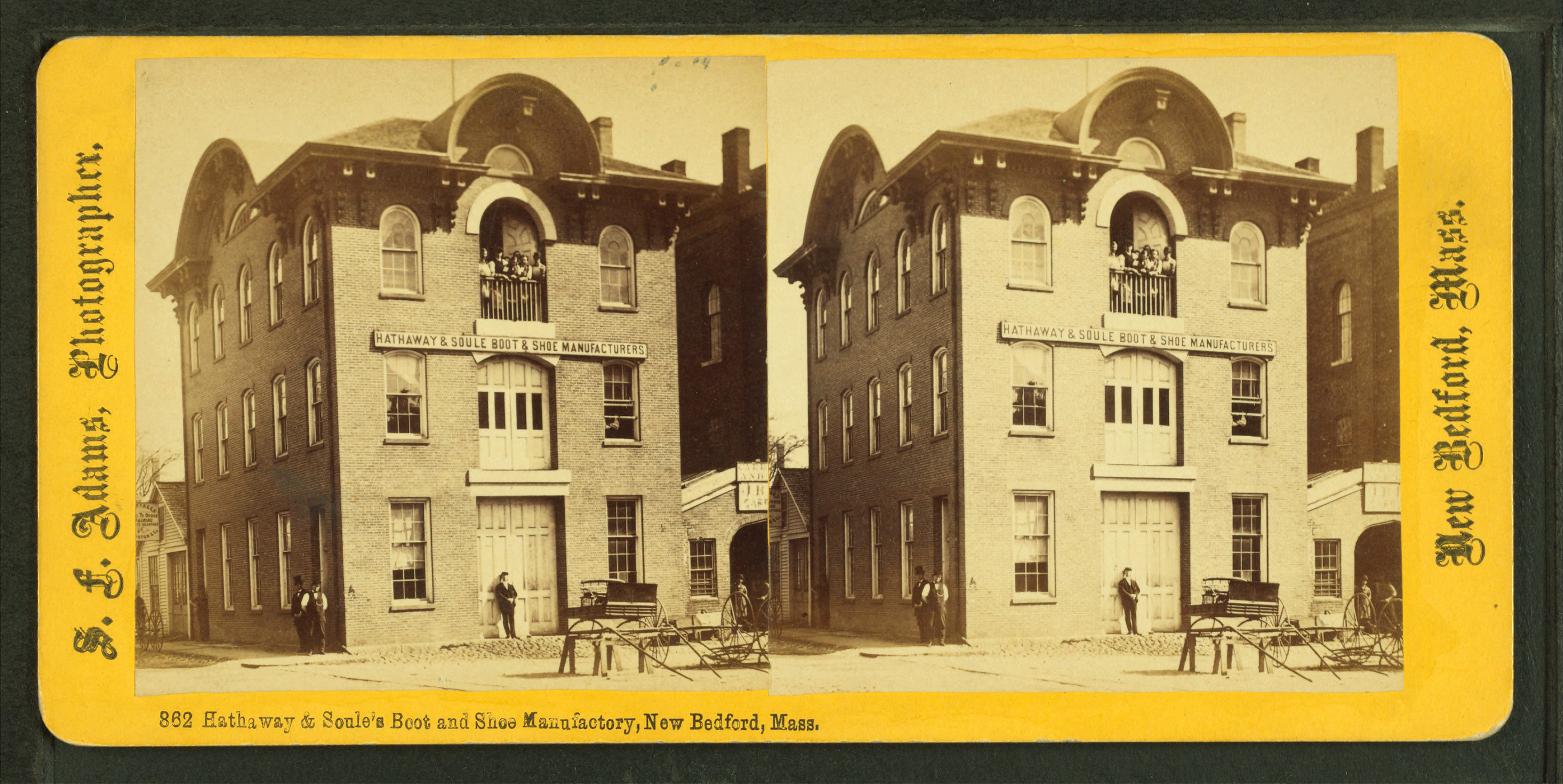
Hathaway & Soule, est.1866

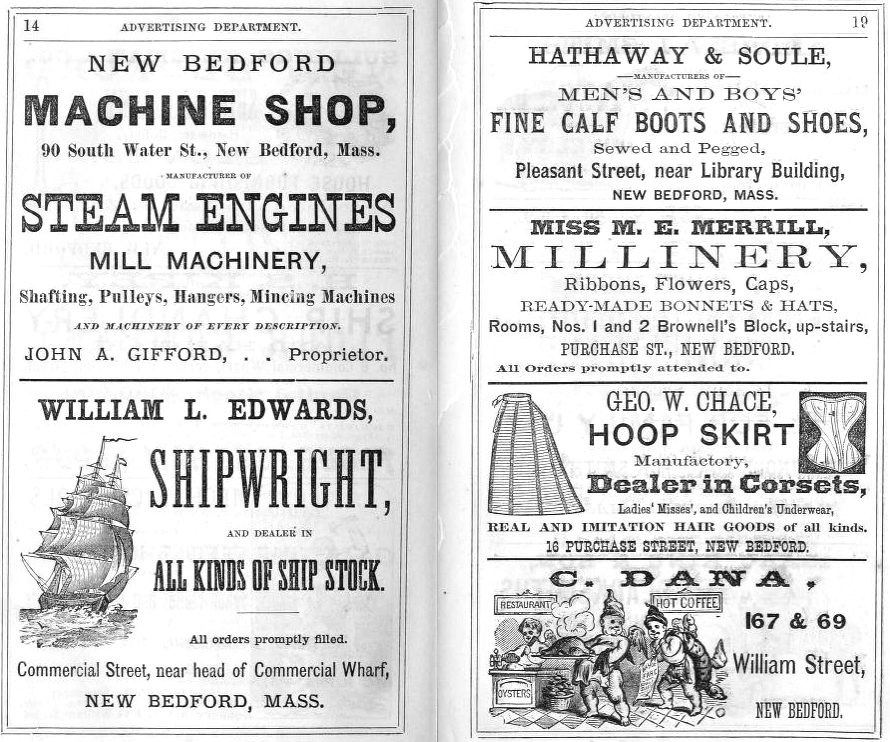
Advertisements, 1873

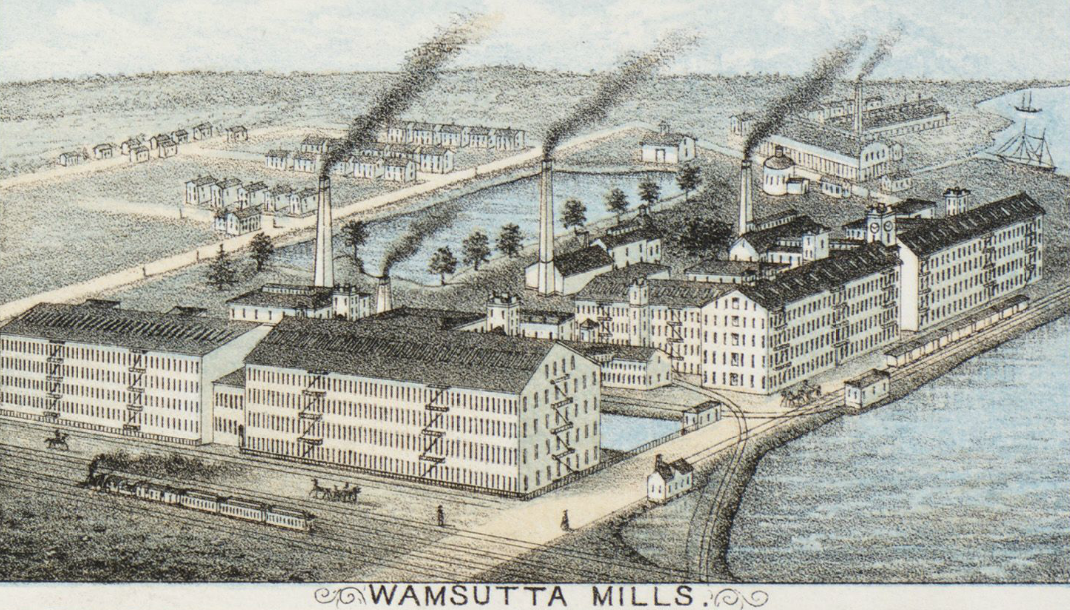
Wamsutta Mills in 1876

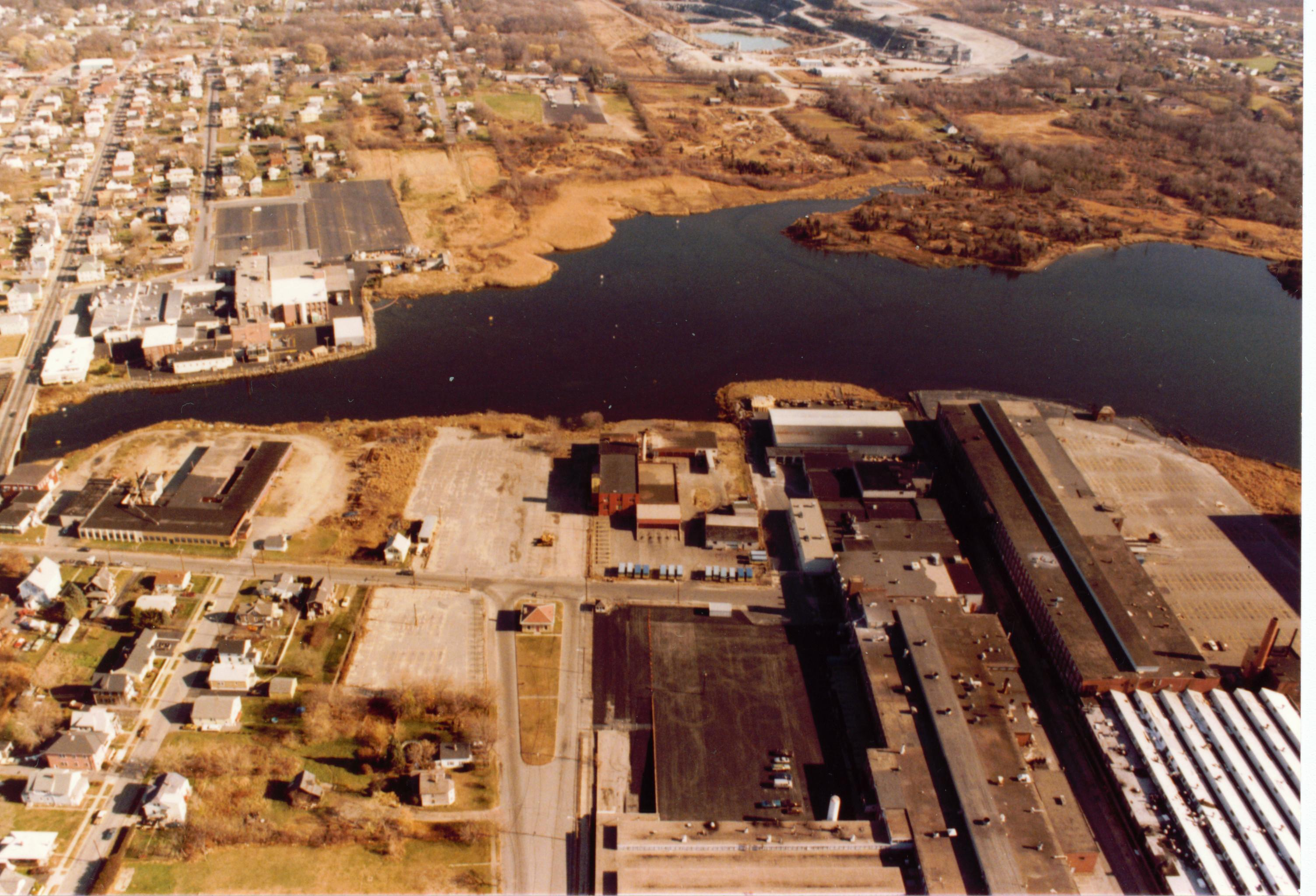
Aerial view of New Bedford Harbor, 1984
