= Old Third District Courthouse =

- U.S. National Register of Historic Places
- U.S. National Historic Landmark District – Contributing property
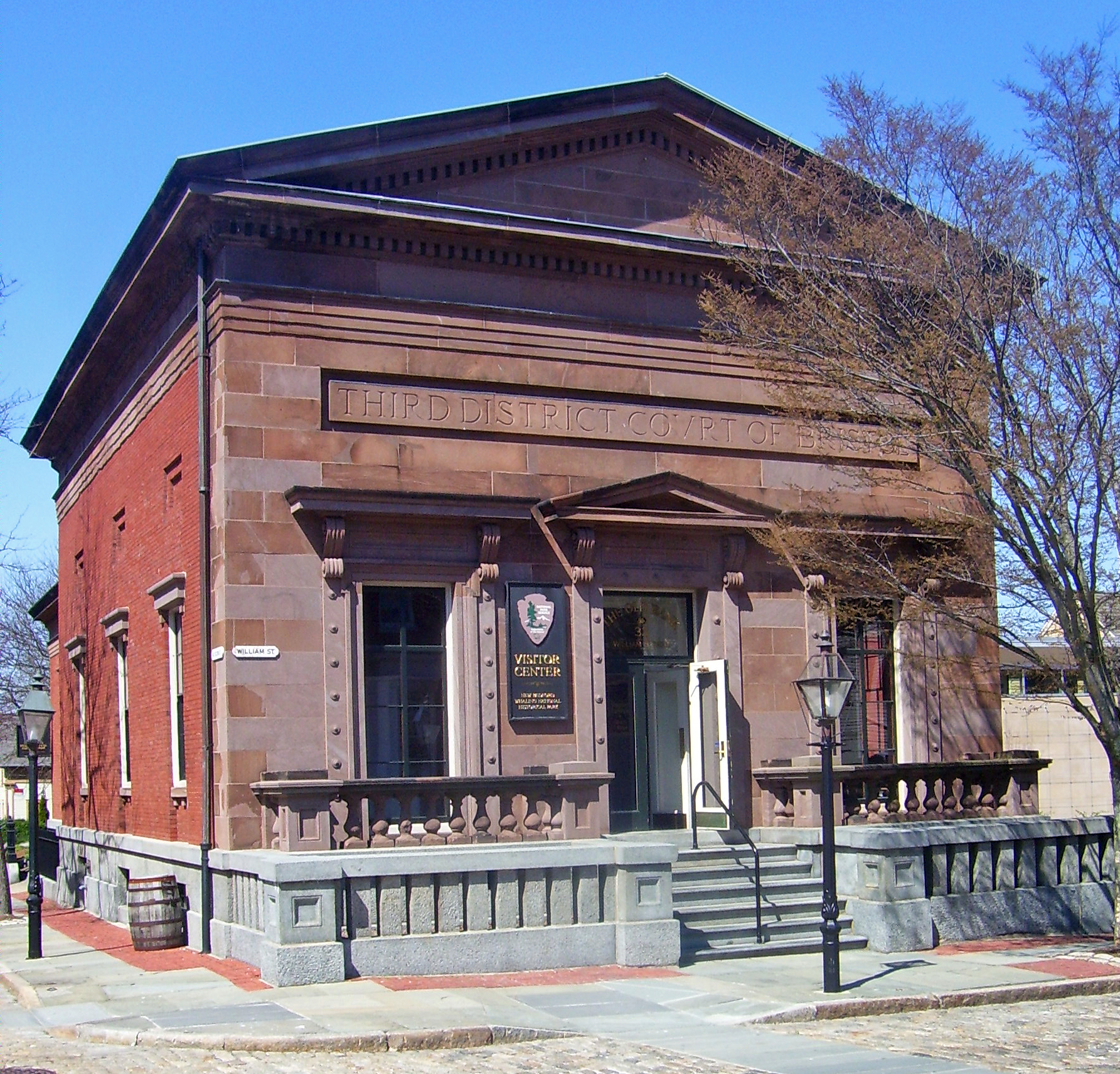
- Front (south) elevation in 2008, with NPS signage
- Location: New Bedford, MA
- Coordinates: 41°38′08″N 70°55′26″W
- Built: 1853
- Architect: Russell Warren
- Architectural style: Greek Revival, Renaissance Revival
- Part of: New Bedford Historic District (ID66000773)
- NRHP reference No.: 71000083

Significant dates
- Added to NRHP: September 28, 1971
- Designated NHLDCP: November 13, 1966

The Old Third District Courthouse in New Bedford, Massachusetts, United States, is located at the corner of Second and William streets. It was built in 1853 by Russell Warren in the Greek Revival architectural style, as the home of the New Bedford Institute for Savings, a local bank. After the bank moved, the Bristol County courts came in. They, too, eventually outgrew it and moved elsewhere in the city. Since the creation of New Bedford Whaling National Historic Park in 1996, it has been used by the National Park Service (NPS) as the park's visitor center.

== History ==
The building itself is a small two-story three-by-three-bay structure of brick with a raised basement and sandstone facade. A small bracketed cornice tops the windows and main entrance on William Street, which is fronted by a granite balustraded porch. The roofline is marked by a pediment. "THIRD DISTRICT COVRT OF BRISTOL" is carved into the second story in prominent letters.

It began life as the NBIS's building. When whaling declined in New Bedford, to be replaced by textiles, the bank moved to larger quarters downtown where it has remained ever since. In 1896, the courts moved in, but later needed more space themselves and moved out. During the mid-20th century it became a store, selling antiques at one time and auto parts at another. It had come back around to being used as a branch by Fleet Bank in 1995 when New Bedford's Waterfront Historic Preservation LEague (WHALE) bought it and turned it over to the NPS.

In 1971, it was listed on the National Register of Historic Places. It is one of 20 contributing properties to the New Bedford Historic District, a National Historic Landmark, and diagonally opposite the U.S. Customhouse, also a National Historic Landmark.

== Visitor Center ==
Inside the building, during its hours of operation, park rangers offer guided walking tours of the historical park, which covers much of the waterfront area of New Bedford. The park's gift shop is also located on the premises. According to a 1999 study conducted for the Park Service, it is the most frequent start of a visitor's journey through the park.

== See also ==
- National Register of Historic Places listings in New Bedford, Massachusetts
