= Crystal Marshall =

American artist (born 1983)

- Born: 1983 (age 42–43)
- Education: Savannah College of Art & Design, Maryland Institute College of Art, Edna Manley College of Art,
- Occupation: Artist
- Website: www.crystalamarshall.com

Crystal Marshall (born 1983) is an American multi-disciplinary artist who currently lives and works in Atlanta, Georgia. She is originally from Kingston, Jamaica.

== Education ==
Marshall earned a BFA degree in 2008 from Maryland Institute College of Art in Baltimore, Maryland and also studied fine arts at Edna Manley College of Art in Kingston, Jamaica between 2003-2005. She received a full scholarship for an exchange program at Pont Aven School of Contemporary art in France in 2006. Marshall has also completed her MFA degree in painting at Savannah College of Art and Design in 2024.

== Career ==
Crystal's artwork has been shown in exhibitions such as "Intersectionality" at the Museum of Contemporary Art North Miami, group exhibit. In addition, Crystal has showcased her works at various group shows such as, New Bedford Art Museum, John Michael Kohler Arts Center, A.I.R. Gallery, Pensacola Museum of Art, Marietta Cobb Museum, Hill-Stead Museum, Plains Art Museum for their 2025 Spring Gala Art Auction :Color Flings & Czong Institute for Contemporary Art Museum in South Korea. She participated at the Hudson Valley MOCA group exhibition "Address Earth 2023". Marshall debut a solo show at the Chrysler Museum of Art Perry Glass Studio in Norfolk, Virginia, Spartanburg Museum in South Carolina where she showcased in a group exhibition "Black Anatomy" .

She has been featured in three issues of New American Paintings South edition. Marshall has been mentioned in publications such as Hyperallergic in 2025. Her work has also been featured in White Hot Magazine in 2025.

Crystal also has been an online resident at Ox-Bow in 2022 and 2023 and at Vermont Studio Center in Vermont, Johnson in 2025. Her work, "Wool III - Tears", is currently displayed at SCAD Museum of Art as a part of their permanent collection.

== Exhibitions ==
=== Solo exhibitions ===
- 2021 STARTnet Art Fair Solo Booth, Saatchi Gallery, London, United Kingdom
- 2022 Crystal Marshall: Solo Series, Czong Institute College of Art Contemporary Art Museum, Gimpo, South Korea
- 2023 Clio Art Fair NYC 2023, Clio Art Fair, New York, New York
- 2023 Vestibule 102, Chrysler Museum of Art Perry Glass Studio, Norfolk, Virginia
- 2025 Post Pandemia; A Transformation, The Supermarket, Atlanta, Georgia

=== Selected group exhibitions ===
- 2025 Annual Juried Exhibition 2025, International Museum of Art & Science, McAllen, Texas
- 2025 Dear Artists..., Band of Vices Gallery, L.A. California
- 2025 Formidables & The Wrong 7, The Wrong Biennale 7th edition (curated by Michele Vitobello & Tassia Mila)
- 2025 Address Earth -Artist Books, Travelling Exhibition, Inspiration Art Group International, New York (curated by Bibiana Huang Matheis)
- 2025 Grit, Alday Hunken Gallery, Atlanta, Georgia
- 2025 The Shape of Who We Are: Exploring Identity, New Bedford Art Museum, Bedford, Massachusetts
- 2025 Wish You Were Here: 2025 Annual Postcard Show, A.I.R. Gallery, Brooklyn, New York
- 2025 And I Will Tell You Mine, John Michael Kohler Arts Center, Sheboygan, Wisconsin
- 2025 MoNA's 2025 Art Auction Stellar Radiance, Museum of Northwest Art, La Conner, Washington
- 2025 Castle in the Sky, Hill-Stead Museum, Farmington, Connecticut
- 2025 Spring Gala Art Auction, Plains Art Museum, Fargo, North Dakota
- 2025 RAM Peeps Brand Art Exhibition, Racine Art Museum, Racine, Wisconsin
- 2025 It/’s Only (super) Natural, University of Mississippi Gallery 130, University, Mississippi
- 2025 Fragments: Reflection on Memory, Annmarie Sculpture Garden & Arts Center, Solomon, Maryland

== Publications ==
- NAP Legacy Addendum, New American Paintings,2025
- Dear Artists...GP.LA, 2025
- Crystal Marshall’s Multidimensional Storytelling, 2025, Whitehot Magazine
- A View From the Easel, 2025, Hyperallergic
- Crystal Marshall: Blackbody Summit, An Afrofuturistic Quest, 2025, Flaunt Magazine
- Crystal Marshall's "Post Pandemia; A Transformation" will debut at The Supermarket a new multi-disciplinary hub and alternative space in Atlanta, Georgia, 2025, Whitehot Magazine
- Post Pandemia: A Transformation" Art Exhibition, 2025, Creative Loafing
- Crystal Marshall: An Afrofuturist Black Female Artist Re-Shaping the definition of “Blackness”, 2024, 1883 Magazine
- #38 NY Profile - Parker Daley Garcia, 2024, Photo Vogue
- Pen and Brush, The Now: Fever Dreams, 2024, ArtForum Guide
- Crystal Marshall’s Afro-Caribbean Artistry Radiates with Cultural Fusion, Medium
- Crystal Marshall's Blackbody: A Journey into the Mind through Dreamscapes, Art Daily
- What's Black at Art Basel? Amazon Prime Video's Riches, METAx Springhill House, AMEX Black Artists Brunch and More, 2022, The Root
- The Best of Black Art and Activations During Art Basel Miami, December 2022, The Black Enterprise
- CICA Art Now 2022,CICA Museum
- Pacific Student- Curate Art Show Focuses on Equality, Jan 2021, University of the Pacific Dreaming of Equ>lity
- Crystal Marshall: A Spiritual Journey, May 2021, Visionary Art Collective
- Crystal Marshall, Issue 1 May 2021,Curators Salon Art Seen
- Crystal Marshall, The Flux Review, April 2021
- The Emancipatory Dreamscapes of Crystal Marshall 2020, In Other Words
- Artist Spotlight, August 2020, Booooooom Magazine

== Selected awards and honors ==
- 2006 Pont Aven School of Contemporary Art, full scholarship
- 2022 Ox-Bow, Virtual Residency, full scholarship, Saugatuck, Michigan
- 2022 SCAD Academic Honors, Achievement Honors & eLearning Scholarship, Atlanta, Georgia
- 2023 Ox-Bow, Virtual Residency, full scholarship, Saugatuck, Michigan
- 2025 Vermont Studio Center, Johnson, Vermont
- 2025 Jackson Fine Arts Prize, Extended longlist, Farleigh Place, London
- 2025 National Juried Exhibition: It's Only (super) Natural, Third place award, University of Mississippi
