= New Bedford Art Museum =

Art museum in Massachusetts, United States

- Established: 1996
- Location: 608 Pleasant Street, New Bedford, Massachusetts
- Coordinates: 41.63517°N 70.92673°W
- Type: Art museum
- Director: Suzanne de Vegh
- Website: newbedfordart.org

The New Bedford Art Museum is a building in New Bedford, Massachusetts, with various exhibits. As an art museum, it has displayed artwork using a variety of mediums: examples include rope, glass, ceramic, and illustrations. It is located on 608 Pleasant Street and the building is listed on the National Historic Register as a contributing property to the Central New Bedford Historic District.

== History ==
The New Bedford Art Museum was founded in 1996. The institution struggled to secure funding in its early years. In 2021, the museum began performing extensive renovations on each of its three floors. Gallery space was doubled, accessibility features were installed, and the municipal office was removed to make more space. Some art collections were then relocated from a local library to the museum. In 2022, a new executive director was hired, Suzanne de Vegh. She had previously worked with museums in New York and moved to New Bedford for the position. The museum began offering a substantial increase in workshop classes during her tenure, as she wanted it to be more "community focused". De Vegh also changed the frequency of different exhibits from once every five to six months to every two to three months.

== Exhibits ==
In 2009, the museum hosted Haunted, a retrospective of the photographer Jane Tuckerman that included her photography, sculpture, painting, and collage. The museum displayed an exhibit titled "Nebulae: The Universe Unveiled" from 2024 to 2025, which included enlarged versions of outer space from NASA photographs and artwork featuring nebulas. The "Arctic Voices" exhibit, installed in 2024, was designed to counter eurocentrism. It displayed paintings by William Bradford along with work created by indigenous artists to contrast different perspectives on the region.

== See also ==
- New Bedford Museum of Glass
- New Bedford Whaling National Historical Park
