= New Bedford Historic District =

Historic district in Massachusetts, United States

- U.S. National Register of Historic Places
- U.S. National Historic Landmark District
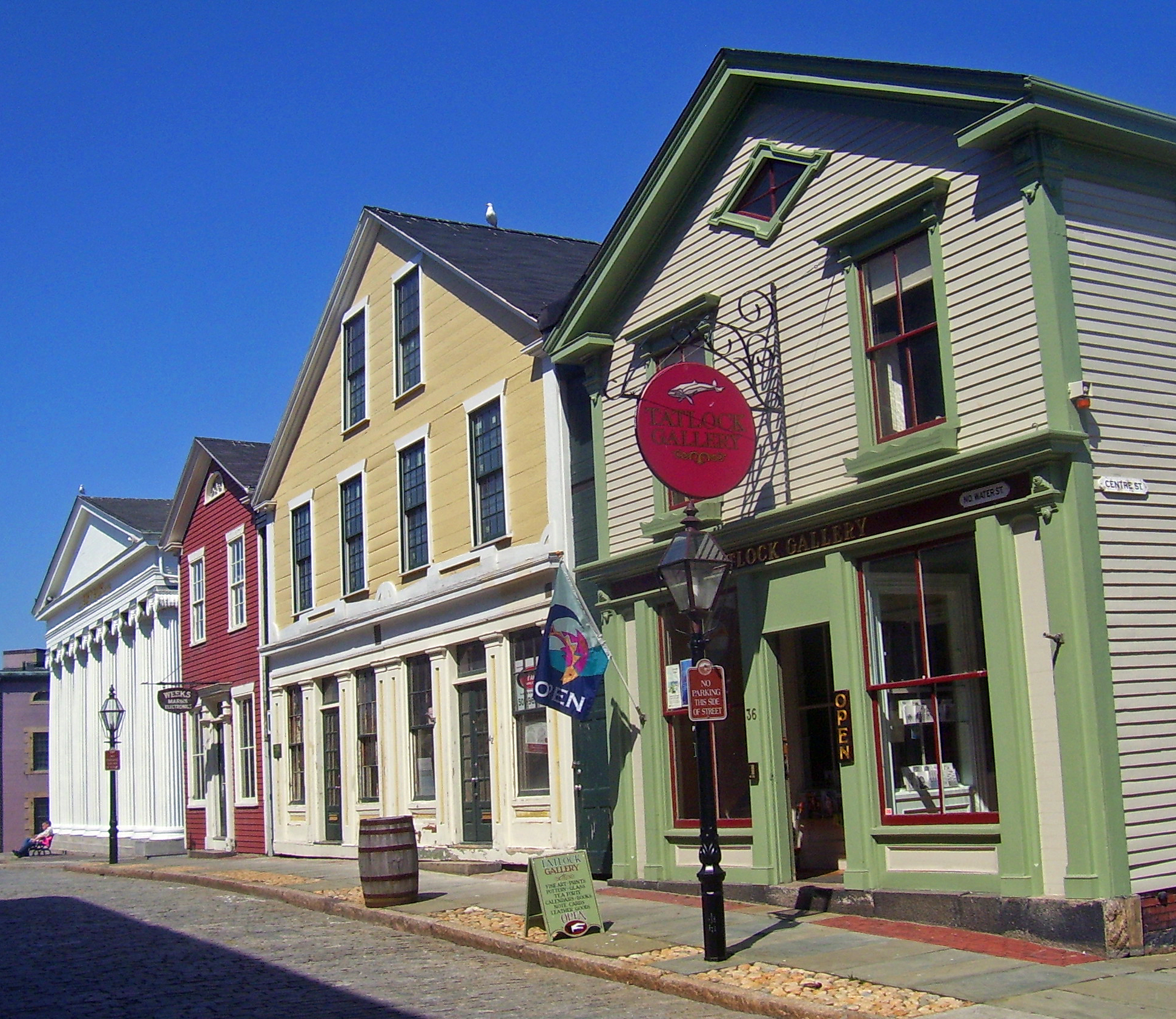
- View along North Water Street, 2008

- Location within Massachusetts Location within the United States
- Location: New Bedford, Massachusetts
- Coordinates: 41°38′7″N 70°55′27″W
- Area: 19.6 acres (7.9 ha)
- Built: 1790
- Architects: Russell Warren, Robert Mills, others
- Architectural style: Greek Revival, Federal
- NRHP reference No.: 66000773

Significant dates
- Added to NRHP: November 13, 1966
- Designated NHLD: November 13, 1966

The New Bedford Historic District is a National Historic Landmark District in New Bedford, Massachusetts, United States, west of the community's waterfront. During the 19th century, when the city was the center of the American whaling industry, this was its downtown. After its decline in the early and mid-20th century, through the efforts of local activist groups the district has since been preserved and restored to appear much as it was during that period.

Most of its buildings were erected between 1790 and 1855 by Russell Warren and other builders working in the Federal and Greek Revival architectural styles. Many of them reflect the legacy of whaling in the city's development. The district was designated a National Historic Landmark (NHL) and added to the National Register of Historic Places in 1966. Later it was recognized as a local historic district and protected by local zoning. One building within it, the U.S. Customhouse, is the oldest such facility currently in use and has been independently recognized as an NHL. Since 1996 the district has also been a part of New Bedford Whaling National Historical Park.

== Geography ==
The district is bounded by Front Street on the east, Elm Street on the north, Acushnet Avenue and the Central New Bedford Historic District on the west, and Commercial Street on the south. This area includes 11 city blocks and part of a twelfth. On these 19.6 acres (7.9 ha) are 20 buildings, mostly historic but with some modern intrusions, mainly parking lots, a gas station and newer additions to the New Bedford Whaling Museum. Cobblestone paving and gas lamps have been added since the historic district was designated, in order to recreate the neighborhood's 19th-century appearance. The majority of the buildings are commercial in design and use, but there are some houses, and some mixed-use structures.

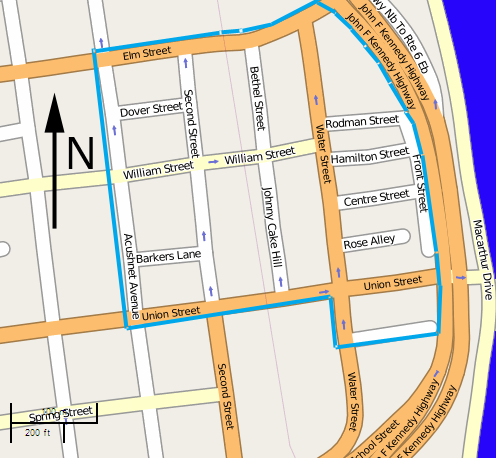
Map showing district boundaries

Just east of the district is the John F. Kennedy Expressway (MA 18), a limited-access highway which has become a barrier between the district and the neighboring waterfront, is still in use. Local preservationists have supported a plan to redesign the highway and restore access to the waterfront that spurred the area's original development. The city received a $16.3 million grant to make this possible.

== History ==
=== Rise as whaling center ===
New Bedford's potential as a whaling port was seen by Joseph Rotch, who moved to the recently settled area in 1765. He and Joseph Russell, a local landowner who is generally regarded as the city's founder, saw that it had a deep harbor that could receive seagoing vessels at docks. Nantucket, then the center of the American whaling industry, did not. Rotch and Russell attracted shipbuilders to the area, and soon one of their ships, the Dartmouth, sailed from the city's docks. In 1767, it carried the first load of New Bedford whale oil to London. By the time of the Revolution, there were 50 ships in the local fleet.

In 1778, the British Army burned the city in retaliation for the acts of local privateers. The fire destroyed 34 ships, 76 shops, 26 storehouses and 11 homes. After independence, the city concentrated on rebuilding its major industry, and in 1791, the Rebecca set sail, becoming the first American whaler to harvest oil from the Pacific. Two decades later, the War of 1812 again took a toll on the industry, which recovered again and by 1823, New Bedford's fleet equalled Nantucket's in tonnage. Four years later the city's whaling industry had surpassed the island's in barrels produced.

As the city prospered in the following years, much of the historic district was built. In the 1830s, Robert Mills designed the U.S. Customhouse, where whaling captains filed necessary paperwork and paid their tariffs and duties. Joseph Rotch's grandson William, by then a wealthy man, built his mansion, now the Rotch-Jones-Duff House and Garden Museum, further inland. The Seamen's Bethel, built in 1832, became the traditional spot for sailors' religious services before departing for the deep oceans, such as the one described in Herman Melville's classic 1851 novel Moby-Dick, which begins in New Bedford.

By 1840, New Bedford, connected to the growing railroad network, had displaced Nantucket as the country's top whaling port. The streets grew busier and the houses grander. Early in Moby-Dick, Melville, who had lived there a decade earlier, describes the city at the height of its prosperity:

But think not that this famous town has only harpooneers, cannibals, and bumpkins to show her visitors. Not at all. Still New Bedford is a queer place. Had it not been for us whalemen, that tract of land would this day perhaps have been in as howling condition as the coast of Labrador. As it is, parts of her back country are enough to frighten one, they look so bony. The town itself is perhaps the dearest place to live in, in all New England. It is a land of oil, true enough: but not like Canaan; a land, also, of corn and wine. The streets do not run with milk; nor in the spring-time do they pave them with fresh eggs. Yet, in spite of this, nowhere in all America will you find more patrician-like houses; parks and gardens more opulent, than in New Bedford. Whence came they? how planted upon this once scraggy scoria of a country? ... Go and gaze upon the iron emblematical harpoons round yonder lofty mansion, and your question will be answered. Yes; all these brave houses and flowery gardens came from the Atlantic, Pacific, and Indian oceans. One and all, they were harpooned and dragged up hither from the bottom of the sea. Can Herr Alexander perform a feat like that?

In New Bedford, fathers, they say, give whales for dowers to their daughters, and portion off their nieces with a few porpoises a-piece. You must go to New Bedford to see a brilliant wedding; for, they say, they have reservoirs of oil in every house, and every night recklessly burn their lengths in spermaceti candles.

In summer time, the town is sweet to see; full of fine maples — long avenues of green and gold. And in August, high in air, the beautiful and bountiful horse-chestnuts, candelabra-wise, proffer the passer-by their tapering upright cones of congregated blossoms. So omnipotent is art; which in many a district of New Bedford has superinduced bright terraces of flowers upon the barren refuse rocks thrown aside at creation's final day.

The New Bedford Institute for Savings (NBIS), now used as the National Park Service's visitors' center, was built in 1853.

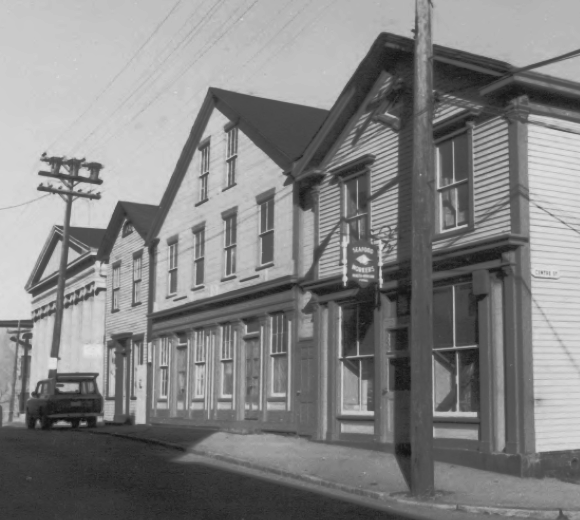
North Water Street in early 1960s, prior to creation of historic district

=== Decline and historic preservation era ===
The whaling industry peaked in 1857, when New Bedford accounted for half the U.S. fleet. Growing competition from the new petroleum industry, and the impact of the Civil War, ensured that it would not recover as it had in the past. The Bethel was rebuilt after an 1867 fire, with a new exterior and an added tower. The NBIS building became a local courthouse, and the center of commercial activity in New Bedford moved west, where it has remained, as textiles became the city's dominant industry. The whaling museum was established in one of the old buildings in 1907. But ships lost at sea were not replaced as they had been before, and in 1927, the John R. Mantra made the last whaling voyage from the city and the last in American history.

Some of the old whaling buildings were torn down to make way for new construction in the 20th century, or deteriorated. But the customs house remained in use, as did many of the buildings in its neighborhood. In the mid-1950s director John Huston came to town with Gregory Peck to film a scene from his adaptation of Moby-Dick in front of the Seamen's Bethel. Although it was the only scene in the film actually shot in the city, it sparked a resurgence of tourist interest when it was released.

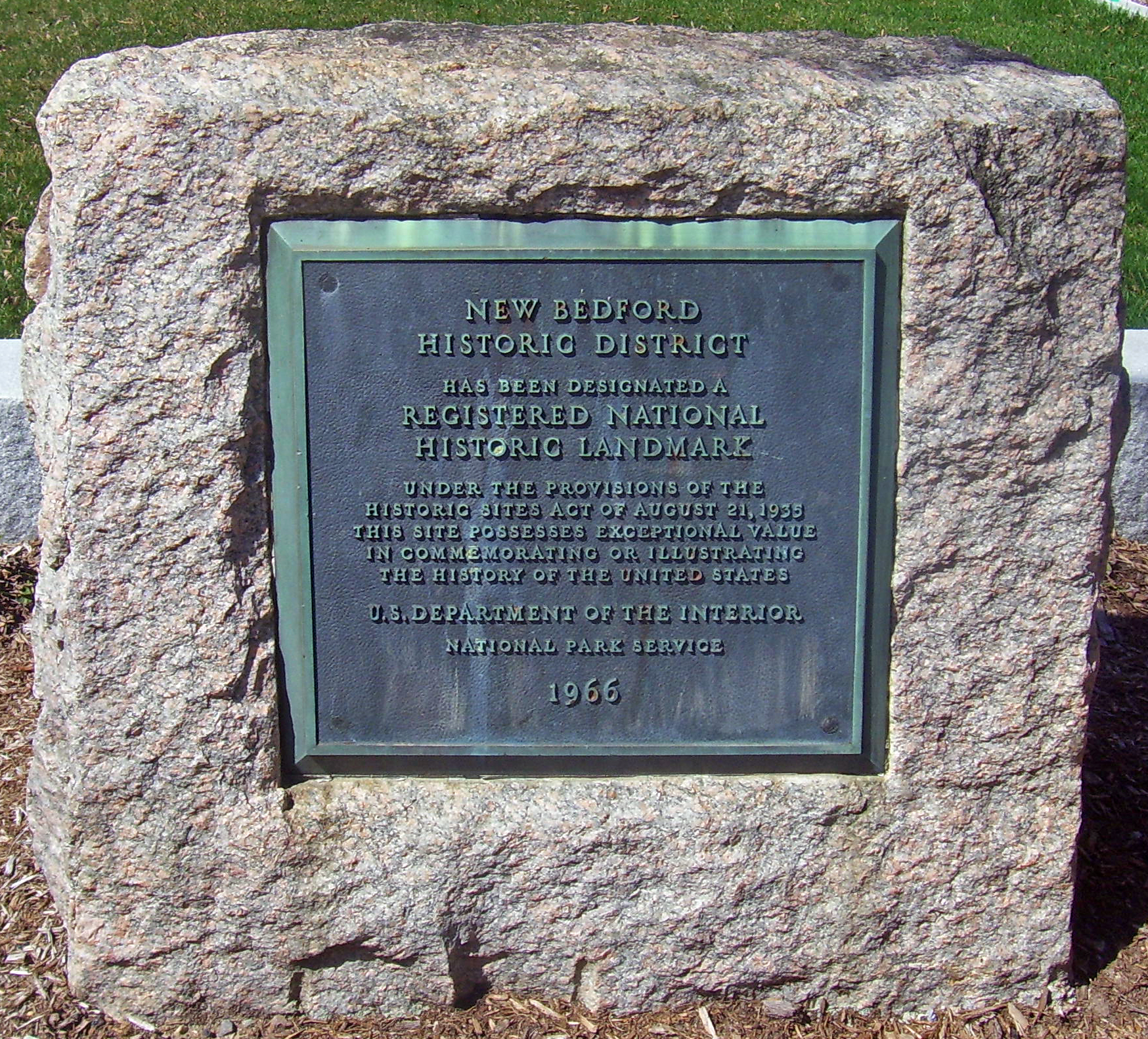
National Historic Landmark designation plaque on William Street

Citizens of New Bedford became interested in preserving and protecting the remnants of the city's whaling past. They formed the Waterfront Historic Area LeaguE (WHALE) in 1962. In 1966, the waterfront area was among the earliest National Historic Landmarks designated by the Secretary of the Interior. Five years later, in 1971, WHALE succeeded in getting today's historic district designated as the Bedford Landing Waterfront Historic District. The city later enacted zoning regulations to preserve its character.

Thirty years later, Congress passed legislation creating New Bedford Whaling National Historical Park, commemorating the city's past. It included the entire historic district within its boundaries, and the park service chose the old NBIS building as its visitor center. In 2008, WHALE turned over the neighboring Corson Building, built 1875-84, to the Park Service, which it had renovated after a 1997 fire. Plans call for it to be used for educational purposes related to the park, with a 60-seat theater, archival space, seminar room, and similar features.

== Significant contributing properties ==
Several of the district's properties are notable. Two have been added to the National Register in their own right, and one has further been designated a National Historic Landmark.

- Mariner's Home. The oldest building in the district, this Federal style stone structure dates to 1790. It was originally built as William Rotch's home, and moved to its present location from William and North Water streets.
- Samuel Rodman Candlehouse. This stone (later stucco) structure dates to 1810. One of the oldest commercial buildings in the district.
- Seamen's Bethel. White clapboard church first built in 1832 and mentioned (as Whalemen's Chapel) by Melville in Moby-Dick. Redesigned and expanded after 1867 fire.
- Mechanics' Bank and Merchants' Bank Building. Warren-designed bank building along North Water Street with Ionic columns in facade was first Greek Revival commercial building in district in 1831.
- U.S. Customhouse. Robert Mills-designed Greek Revival public building opened in 1836. Still in use by U.S. Customs and Border Protection as a port of entry, and has been designated a National Historic Landmark in its own right.
- Old Third District Courthouse. Warren-built sandstone Greek Revival building opened in 1853 on opposite corner from Customhouse as New Bedford Institute for Savings. Became a local courthouse in 1896, later an antiques shop and auto-parts store. Today serves as the National Park Service visitors' center.
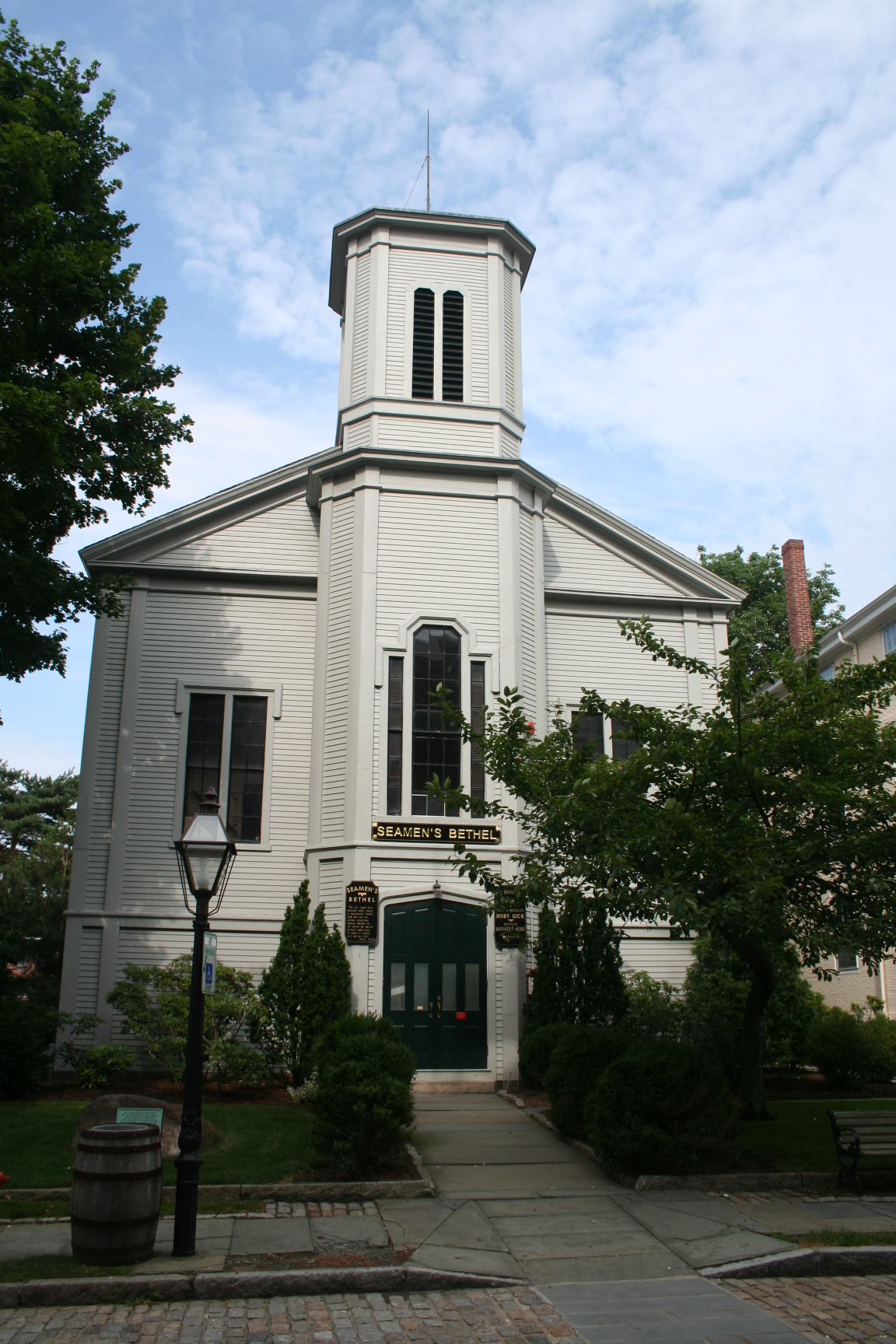
Seamens Bethel

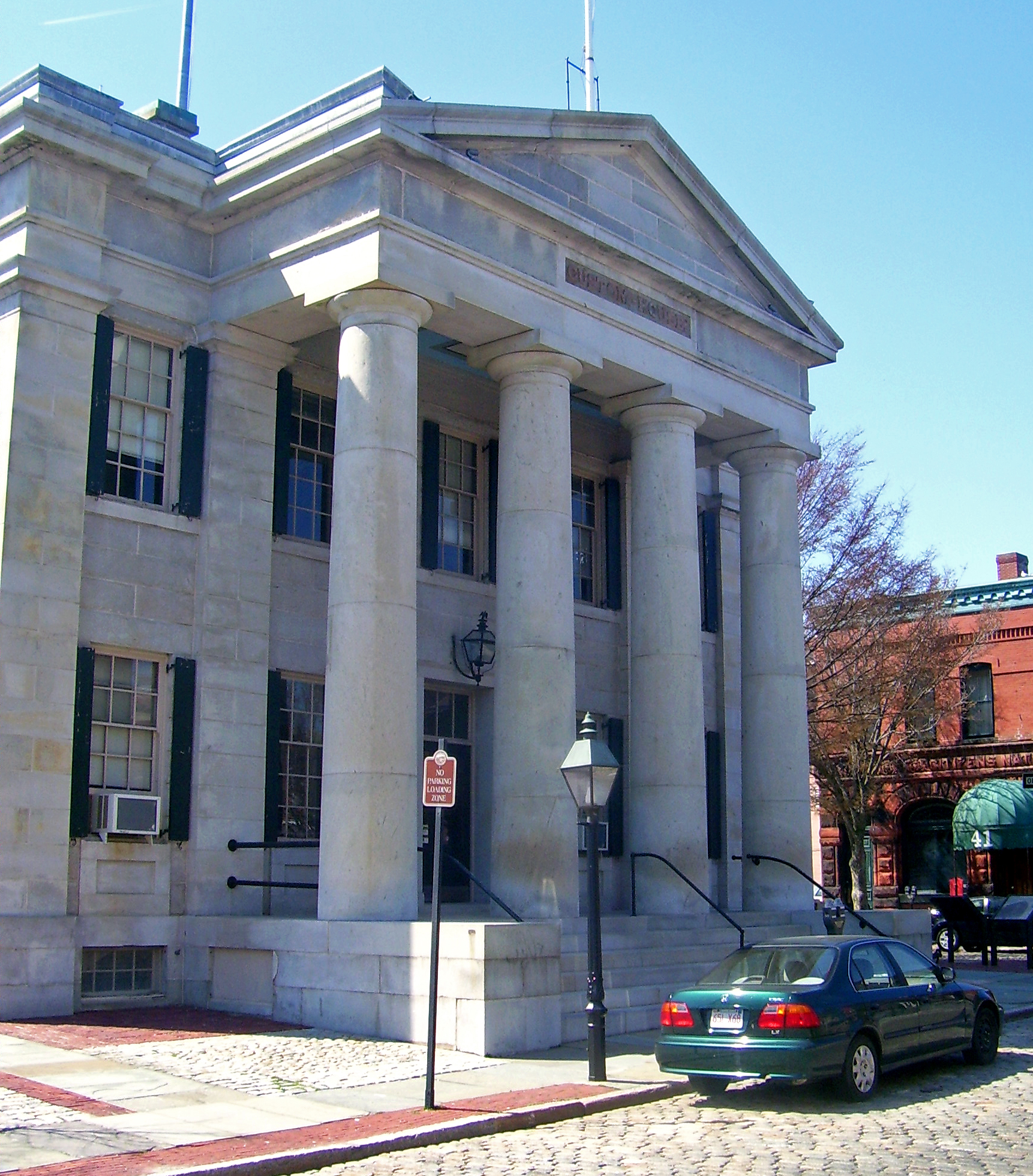
U.S. Customhouse

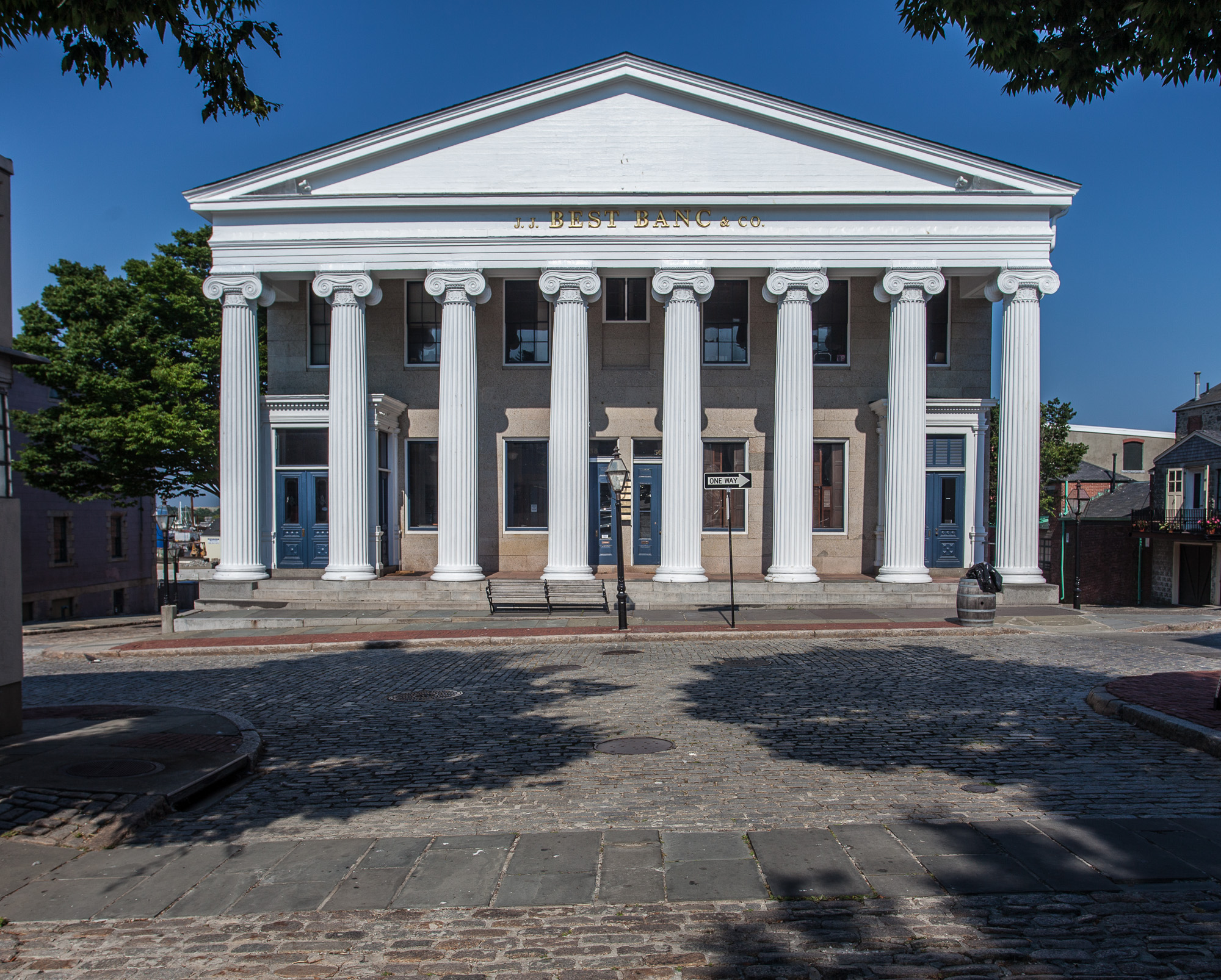
Mechanics' Bank and Merchant's Bank Building.

== Preservation ==
The City of New Bedford maintains the historic character of the district through its zoning, a condition of the state historic-district designation. WHALE has also been active in applying for grants and raising money to restore individual properties within the district.

== See also ==
- Nantucket Historic District, another whaling-related National Historic Landmark
- List of National Historic Landmarks in Massachusetts
- National Register of Historic Places listings in New Bedford, Massachusetts

== Bibliography ==
- Mawar, Granville (1999). Ahab's Trade: The Saga of South Seas Whaling. St. Martin's Press New York. ISBN 0-312-22809-0.
- Melville, Herman (1851). Moby-Dick. Plain Label Books. ISBN 1-60303-374-2.
