= James Henry Gooding =

American journalist and Union officer

James Henry Gooding (August 28, 1838 – July 19, 1864) was a Corporal in the 54th Massachusetts Volunteer Infantry, an American Civil War Union regiment, and a war correspondent to the New Bedford, Massachusetts Mercury newspaper.

== Biography ==
James Henry Gooding was born into slavery on August 28, 1838, in North Carolina. At a very early age, his freedom was purchased by James M. Gooding, who may have been his father, and he was sent to New York City. On September 11, 1846, Gooding was enrolled as a student in the Colored Orphan Asylum, a prominent school and boarding house in New York City run primarily by Quaker women. There, he received a classical education and became a proficient and prolific writer, a talent that served him for the rest of his life. From 1850 to 1852, he was indentured out of the asylum to work for Albert Westlake. As he approached adulthood, he decided to hide his past as a slave and began telling people he was born free in Troy, New York. In 1856, at the age of 18, he took a job on a whaling ship out of New Bedford, Massachusetts.

Whaling was one of the few industries at that time in which an African-American man could find employment on equal footing with whites. He often composed poetry describing life at sea on whaling ships. During his voyages, he earned as much as $20 per month, a salary equivalent to that of an officer on board a ship. He gave up whaling in the fall of 1862, when he settled down in New Bedford and married Ellen Allen in the Seamen's Bethel, a prominent church in the city.

Six days before Gooding's marriage, President Abraham Lincoln announced the Emancipation Proclamation, which took effect January 1, 1863, and opened the door for the enlistment of African Americans into the Union armies. On February 10, 1863, the 54th Massachusetts Volunteer Infantry recruiting office in New Bedford opened, and on February 14, Gooding enlisted as a member of Company C. In September 1863, James Gooding wrote a letter to Abraham Lincoln. His letters talked about how he was tired of being paid only ten dollars a month compared to the thirteen dollars a month that white soldiers received, and far less than the twenty dollars he had earned on his last voyage at sea. He demanded equal pay for his work. He was well regarded and was promoted to corporal in December 1863.

Gooding fought steadfastly with the regiment, in the midst of the assault on Fort Wagner in Charleston Harbor on July 18, 1863, and in the Battle of Olustee, Florida, on February 20, 1864, where he was shot and presumed to be dead. In the latter battle, his commander sent a notification to the editors of the Mercury that he had been killed in battle, and his wife applied for a pension in April. He was, however, not dead. Wounded in the thigh, Gooding was taken to Andersonville Prison in early March 1864, where he died as a prisoner of war on July 19, 1864. He is buried in grave 3,585 in the Andersonville National Cemetery. Unknown to him at the time of his death, Congress had passed a law in June 1864 which granted equal pay to African American soldiers.
