= Merrill's Wharf Historic District =

Historic district in Massachusetts, United States

- U.S. National Register of Historic Places
- U.S. Historic district
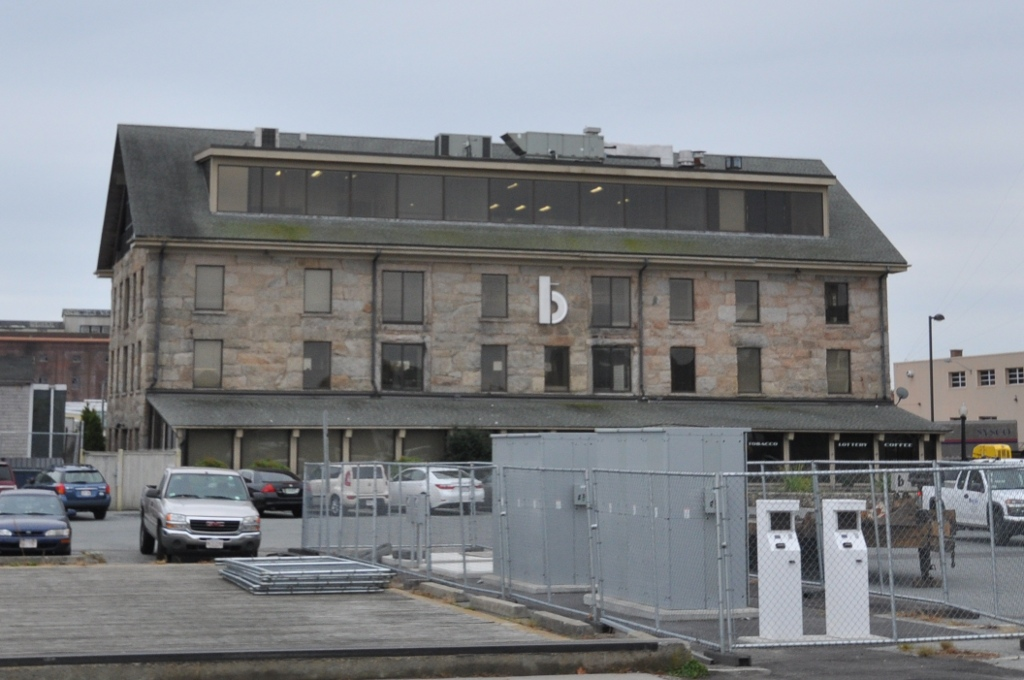
- The former counting house at the foot of Merrill's Wharf

- Location within Massachusetts Location within the United States
- Location: New Bedford, Massachusetts
- Coordinates: 41°37′59″N 70°55′15″W
- Built: 1837
- Architect: Edward Merrill
- NRHP reference No.: 77000167
- Added to NRHP: November 11, 1977

The Merrill's Wharf Historic District is a historic district encompassing a portion of the waterfront area of New Bedford, Massachusetts. It encompasses two wharves just to the south of State Pier: the Steamboat Pier and the adjacent Coal Packet Pier. Also included is the stone counting house (also known as the Durant Sail Loft) built by Edward Merrill, the last surviving stone waterfront structure from New Bedford's heyday as a whaling center. (It does not include the long pier built by Merrill that is now called Homer's Wharf, which no longer retains historic integrity.)

The district was listed on the National Register of Historic Places in 1977. It is now part of the New Bedford Whaling National Historical Park, with interpretive signs. The schooner Ernestina, a National Historic Landmark ship owned by the state, is berthed at Steamship Wharf.

== See also ==
- National Register of Historic Places listings in New Bedford, Massachusetts
