= New Bedford Museum of Glass =

Museum in Massachusetts, U.S.

The New Bedford Museum of Glass
- Established: 1993
- Location: 427 County Street; New Bedford, Massachusetts
- Coordinates: 41.6493°N 70.9259°W
- Director: Kirk J. Nelson
- Website: www.nbmog.org

The New Bedford Museum of Glass, located in New Bedford, Massachusetts, is home to a wide collection of glass ranging from ancient Mediterranean unguent bottles to designs by contemporary artists such as Dale Chihuly.

== History ==
It was first established in 1993 as the Glass Art Center at the former Bradford College in Haverhill, Massachusetts. After the college closed, the museum relocated to New Bedford in part due to the city's rich heritage of glassmaking. As a result, Mount Washington glass and Pairpoint glass compose a large part of the museum's collection.

The New Bedford Museum of Glass originally opened in 2010 in one of the original buildings of the historic Wamsutta Textile Mills complex. After temporarily closing in 2019, it relocated to the historic James Arnold Mansion at 427 County Street in January 2022.

== Glassmaking in New Bedford ==
New Bedford was one of the world's most industrious cities during the 1800s due to its easily accessible harbor and the fortune generated by the whaling industry. As a result, the Mount Washington glass company relocated from Boston to New Bedford in 1870. In 1880, the Pairpoint Manufacturing company opened, absorbing Mount Washington in 1894. Pairpoint remained in operation as a glass manufacturer until 1938 when it went out of business. It opened up again briefly as the Gundersen-Pairpoint Glass Company before being renamed for a final time to Pairpoint Glass Company.

== Collection ==
The museum's collection numbers more than 7,000 items. The earliest example of glass on display is a core-formed vessel of eastern Mediterranean origin dating from 600 BCE. European glass includes a diamond-engraved wine glass of about 1690, an English seal bottle dated 1785, a glass portrait medallion of about 1813 representing Arthur Wellesley, the First Duke of Wellington, by English artist John Henning, and numerous other examples. Early American glass is particularly well represented in the museum galleries. The collection includes outstanding examples by the Boston and Sandwich Glass Company, the New England Glass Company, Thomas Cains' Phoenix Glass Works of South Boston, Bakewell, Page and Bakewell of Pittsburgh and many other celebrated makers. Examples of New Bedford glass include Mount Washington's Amberina, Burmese, Crown Milano, Lava Glass, Peach Blow, and Royal Flemish art glass and Pairpoint engraved pieces. Contemporary artists include Dale Chihuly, Edris Eckhardt, and Harvey Littleton. The museum's collection of American political glass, featured in a special installation at the New Bedford City Hall, is the largest of its kind on public display, numbering more than 500 items. Popular permanent exhibits in the museum galleries include "Contemporary Paperweights: The Schimmelpfeng Collection" and "Atomic Green Vaseline: Uranium Glass in Everyday Life." Another important resource at the museum is the Virginia Shaw Rockwell Research Library, which contains more than 6,000 publications on the subject of glass.

== See also ==
- New Bedford Art Museum
