= United States Customhouse (New Bedford, Massachusetts) =

- U.S. Customhouse
- U.S. National Register of Historic Places
- U.S. National Historic Landmark
- U.S. National Historic Landmark District – Contributing property
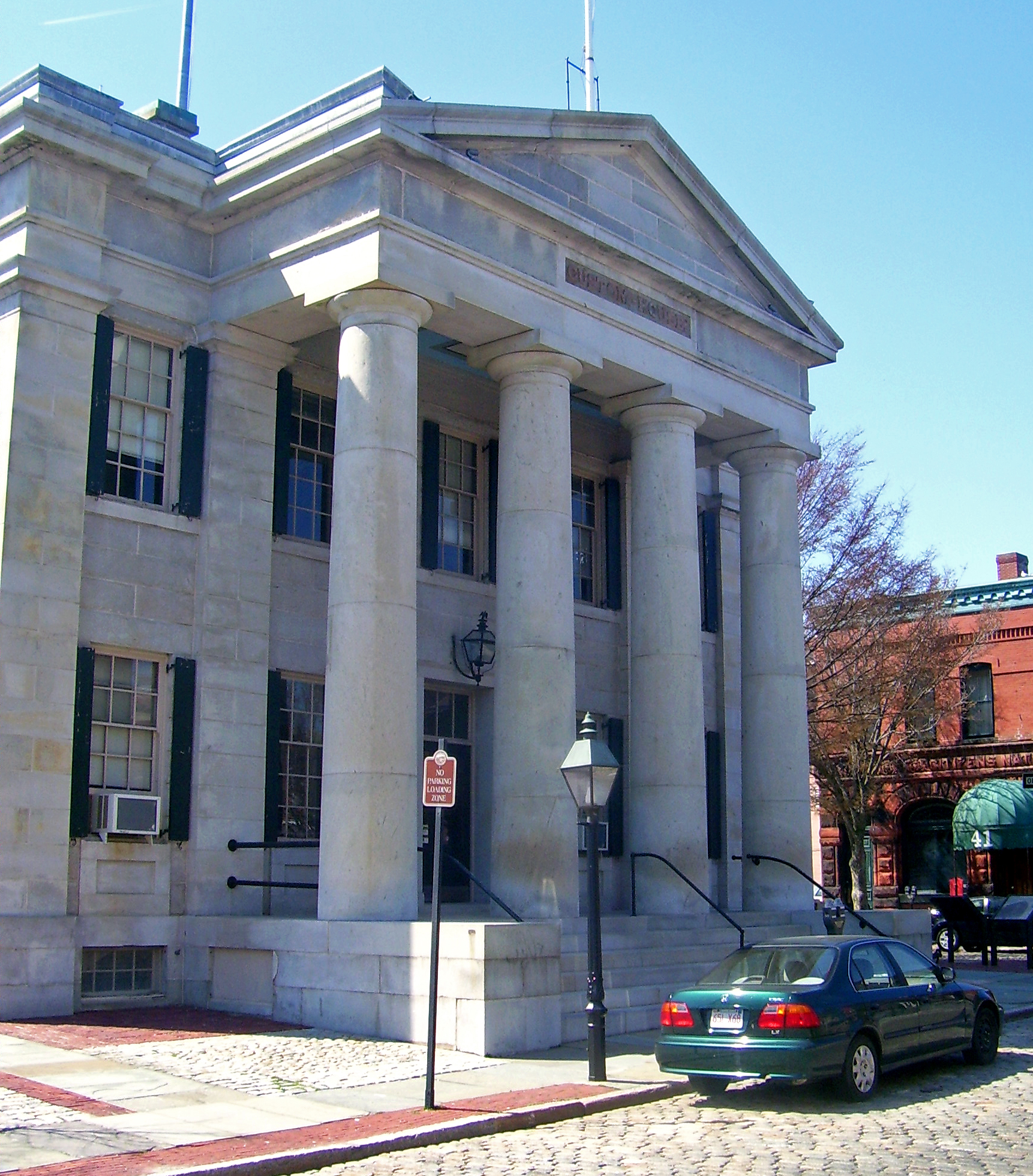
- Front (east) elevation, 2008

- Location within Massachusetts Location within the United States
- Location: New Bedford, Massachusetts
- Coordinates: 41°38′7″N 70°55′29″W
- Area: less than one acre
- Built: 1834
- Architect: Robert Mills
- Architectural style: Greek Revival
- Part of: New Bedford Historic District (ID66000773)
- NRHP reference No.: 70000735

Significant dates
- Added to NRHP: December 30, 1970
- Designated NHL: December 30, 1970
- Designated NHLDCP: November 13, 1966

The United States Customhouse is a historic and active custom house at 2nd and William Streets in New Bedford, Massachusetts. Architect Robert Mills designed the custom house in 1834 in a Greek Revival style. It has been used by the U.S. Customs Service ever since, and today serves as a port of entry.

The building was designated a National Historic Landmark and added to the National Register of Historic Places in 1970 for its architectural significance as one of the finest modest Greek Revival government buildings in New England.

== Building history ==
In 1789, New Bedford was chosen to be the administrative center of the Tenth U.S. Customs District. Colonel Edward Pope was chosen to be the district's first collector. By 1825, New Bedford had surpassed Nantucket as the world capital of the whaling industry, a distinction it would hold for much of the nineteenth century. In response to the importance of New Bedford as a port city, the U.S. Congress authorized the construction of a Custom House in 1832. The initial appropriation was $15,000, but the funds were insufficient to meet new U.S. Treasury Department requirements for fireproof construction. With the allocation of additional appropriations, construction began in 1834. The final cost was approximately $31,000.

The design of the U.S. Custom House is attributed to Robert Mills (1781–1855), architect of the U.S. Treasury Building and the U.S. Patent Office in Washington, DC. Mills also designed three other U.S. Custom Houses in New England at about the same time: those in New London and Middletown, Connecticut, and Newburyport, Massachusetts. Although the four Greek Revival U.S. Custom Houses are similar in scale, plan, materials, and detailing, the New Bedford building is the largest and most architecturally elaborate. Collectively, the buildings represent an early example of standardized construction and supervision that formed a pattern of design for the federal building program in later years.

Considered functionally outdated in 1958, the U.S. Custom House was extensively restored in 1962. It was listed as a contributing building in the New Bedford National Historic Landmark District in 1966. In 1970 it was designated a National Historic Landmark and listed in the National Register of Historic Places. The U.S. Custom House became part of the New Bedford Whaling National Historical Park in 1996.

== Architecture ==
The U.S. Custom House in New Bedford, erected between 1834–1836, is an exceptional illustration of a modest public building designed in the Greek Revival style. Located a few blocks from the waterfront, the oblong, symmetrical building occupies most of its site with the principal entrance and first story located approximately four feet above grade. Set 50-feet above the tide level with an uninterrupted view of the harbor, the U.S. Custom House has been a city landmark since its completion.

The design of federal buildings changed significantly following a fire in 1833 that destroyed the Executive Office Building in Washington, DC. Seeking to end the onslaught of fires, the Treasury Department instituted new requirements for fireproofing federal buildings. The initial appropriation for the U.S. Custom House had been for a brick building with wood framing, but Mills designed a solid masonry building. His design demonstrated skill with fireproof construction methods, which remained evident in all of his later federal commissions.

The monumental U.S. Custom House is five bays wide and three bays deep, rising two stories above a full basement. The structure has granite-faced, masonry-bearing walls with floors supported by brick groin-vaults and a hipped roof carried by zinc-coated wood trusses. Four chimneys rise from the center of the building enclosing the original rooftop observatory.

The dramatic portico dominates the main (east) elevation on North Second Street. This significant feature was excluded from the original contract due to its expense and decorative purpose. The high-style portico, which is characteristic of the Greek Revival style, was part of a second set of construction specifications produced in 1836. It is composed of four slightly tapered Doric order columns, twenty-five feet in height and two feet three inches in diameter. Each column consists of four pieces of stone and supports an enclosed pediment, accentuating the building's wide entablature.

The building's modest interior finishes reflect not only the frugality of the federal building program during this period, but also the sparseness of the Greek Revival style. Interior spaces are organized along a central corridor on the first floor. The stair hall runs perpendicular to the south side of the main axis. The main hall is located on the second floor, with offices and storage occupying the remaining portions of the building. Extant interior features original to the building include the groin vaults of the ceiling in the first-floor office spaces, plastered wall surfaces, molded wood service counters, and a built-in measuring device from 1859. Late 19th century wainscoting composed of beaded vertical boards and wide baseboards survive in the first-floor corridor but the original pine flooring is covered with black-and-white marble tiles. The main stair is modestly detailed with stone treads, wood handrail, and square iron balusters. The workmanship that created these stairs was described in 1837 by John L. Sibley in The American Magazine of Useful and Entertaining Knowledge, as "not surpassed by any which we have ever seen."

In the 1960s the building was extensively restored. The exterior was cleaned, the 2/2 double-hung sash wood windows installed in the 1870s were replaced with 6/6 double-hung wood sashes replicating the original windows, and the mid-nineteenth-century cupola was removed. The exterior of the building was cleaned again in 1981. Following an assessment of preservation needs, a major historic rehabilitation project is planned for the U.S. Custom House that includes improvements necessary for continued use of this significant national resource.

== Significant events ==
- 1832: Construction of the U.S. Custom House is authorized by Congress.
- 1833: Robert Mills designs the U.S. Custom House at New Bedford along with three other U.S. Custom Houses in New England.
- 1834-1836: The U.S. Custom House is constructed.
- 1958: A Building Evaluation Report concludes that the 120-year-old building is "functionally outdated."
- 1961-1962: The building is documented by the Historic American Buildings Survey (HABS) and is restored.
- 1966: The U.S. Custom House is listed as a contributing building in the New Bedford National Historic Landmark District.
- 1970: The building is designated a National Historic Landmark and listed in the National Register of Historic Places.
- 1996: The building becomes part of the New Bedford Whaling National Historical Park.
- 2025: The building is listed by the General Services Administration as a "non-core" property the government could close or sell.

== Building facts ==
- Architect: Robert Mills
- Construction Dates: 1834-1836
- Landmark Status: National Historic Landmark
- Listed in the National Register of Historic Places
- Contributing building in the New Bedford National Historic Landmark District
- Location: 37 North Second Street
- Architectural Style: Greek Revival
- Primary Materials: Hallowell granite
- Prominent Feature: Portico

== Gallery ==
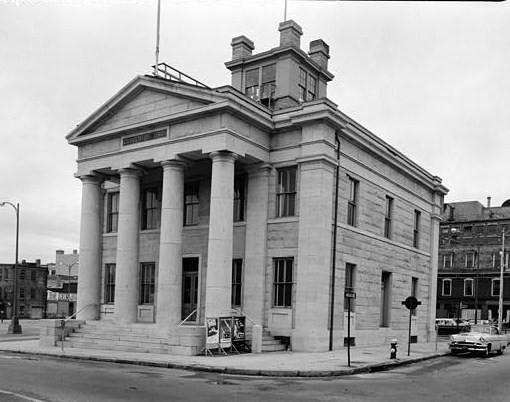
Customhouse in the early 1930s

== See also ==
- National Register of Historic Places listings in New Bedford, Massachusetts
