= Seamen's Bethel =

- U.S. National Historic Landmark District – Contributing property
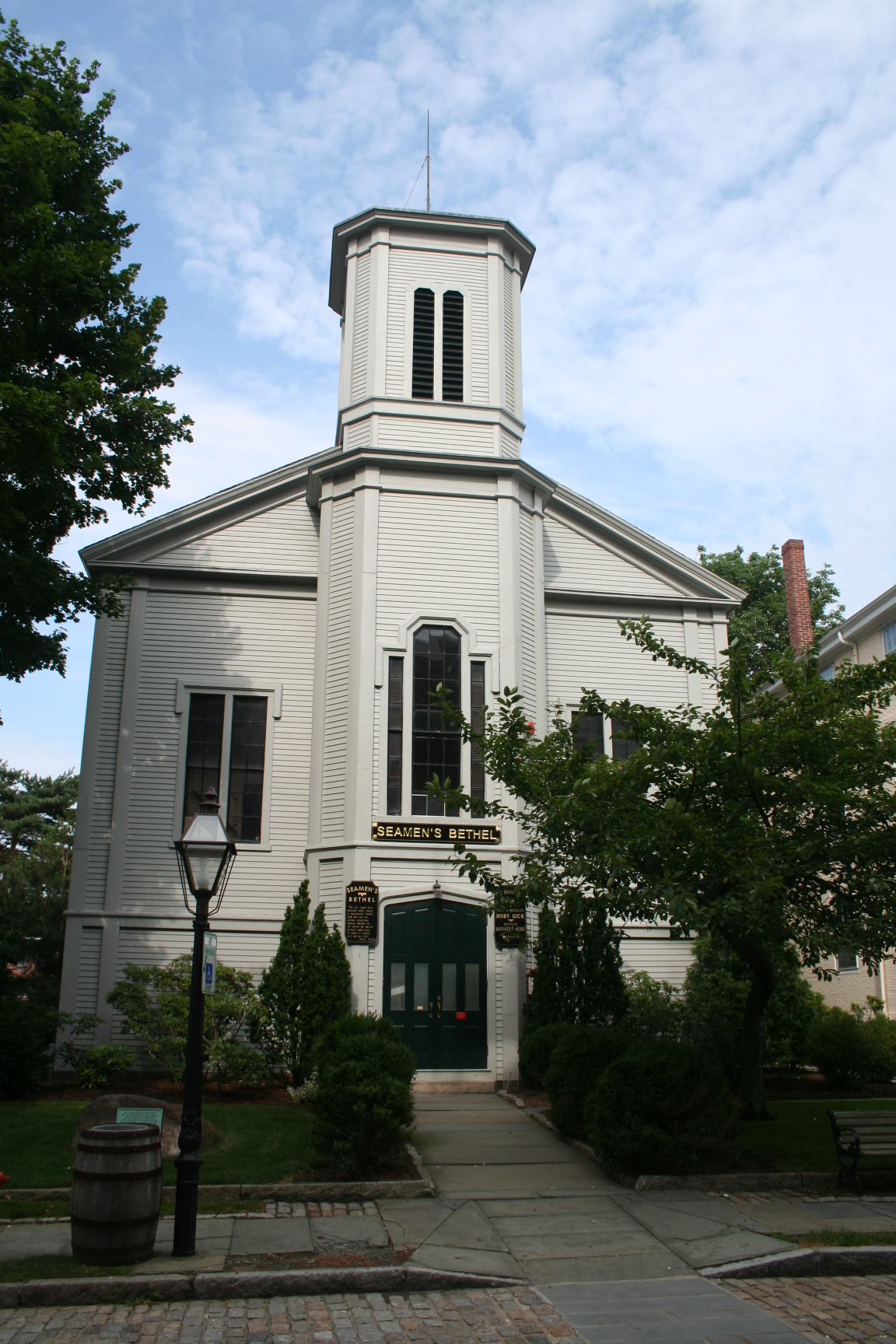
- Front elevation, 2006
- Location: New Bedford, Massachusetts
- Coordinates: 41°38′08″N 70°55′26″W
- Area: New Bedford Historic District
- Built: 1832
- Designated NHLDCP: 1966

The Seamen's Bethel (or Seaman's Bethel) is a chapel in New Bedford, Massachusetts, United States, located at 15 Johnny Cake Hill. It most often served as a chapel that the many sailors visiting New Bedford would attend before they ventured off to sea.

== History ==
Built by the New Bedford Port Society, it was completed on May 2, 1832. It is a contributing property to the New Bedford Historic District, a National Historic Landmark.

The Seamen's Bethel was specifically constructed for the many sailors who called New Bedford their home port (mostly whalers), who considered it a matter of tradition that one visited the chapel before setting sail.

Some changes were made when the structure was repaired after a fire in 1866. The names of New Bedford whalers killed, and later, all area fishermen, are noted on the walls of the Bethel.

James Henry Gooding, a war correspondent and member of the 54th Massachusetts Infantry Regiment during the Civil War, married Ellen Louisa Allen in the Bethel in the summer of 1862.

In 1996, the Seamen's Bethel, along with the New Bedford Whaling Museum (located across the street), the historic district and other icons of New Bedford whaling were collectively made into the New Bedford Whaling National Historical Park.

== Moby-Dick ==
In 1851, Herman Melville published Moby-Dick, his famous tale of the white whale. The Bethel was immortalized in the book as the "Whaleman's Chapel". Melville wrote:

In this same New Bedford there stands a Whaleman's Chapel, and few are the moody fishermen, shortly bound for the Indian Ocean or Pacific, who fail to make a Sunday visit to the spot.

In the novel, a nautically-themed sermon is given from a bow-shaped pulpit by a chaplain named Father Mapple. The character is generally believed to be inspired by Father Edward Thompson Taylor, who Melville likely heard preaching in Boston. However, he was likely also inspired to create the character after hearing Enoch Mudge preaching at the Seamen's Bethel on December 27, 1840, while in New Bedford awaiting his own departure on a whaling vessel.

The pulpit shaped like the bow of a ship in the novel was a Melville invention, but a replica of the one described in the book was added to the chapel in 1961 by Robert Baker, boat builder and naval architect from Westport, MA. Also noted is the pew that Melville sat in when he visited in 1840.

== In film ==
Shots of Seamen's Bethel appear in the 1922 film Down to the Sea in Ships. In 1956, John Huston shot a scene from the movie adaptation of Moby-Dick starring Gregory Peck and Orson Welles in front of the real Seamen's Bethel, but interior shots in the movie were not shot on-location. This revitalized tourism to the area.

== Images ==
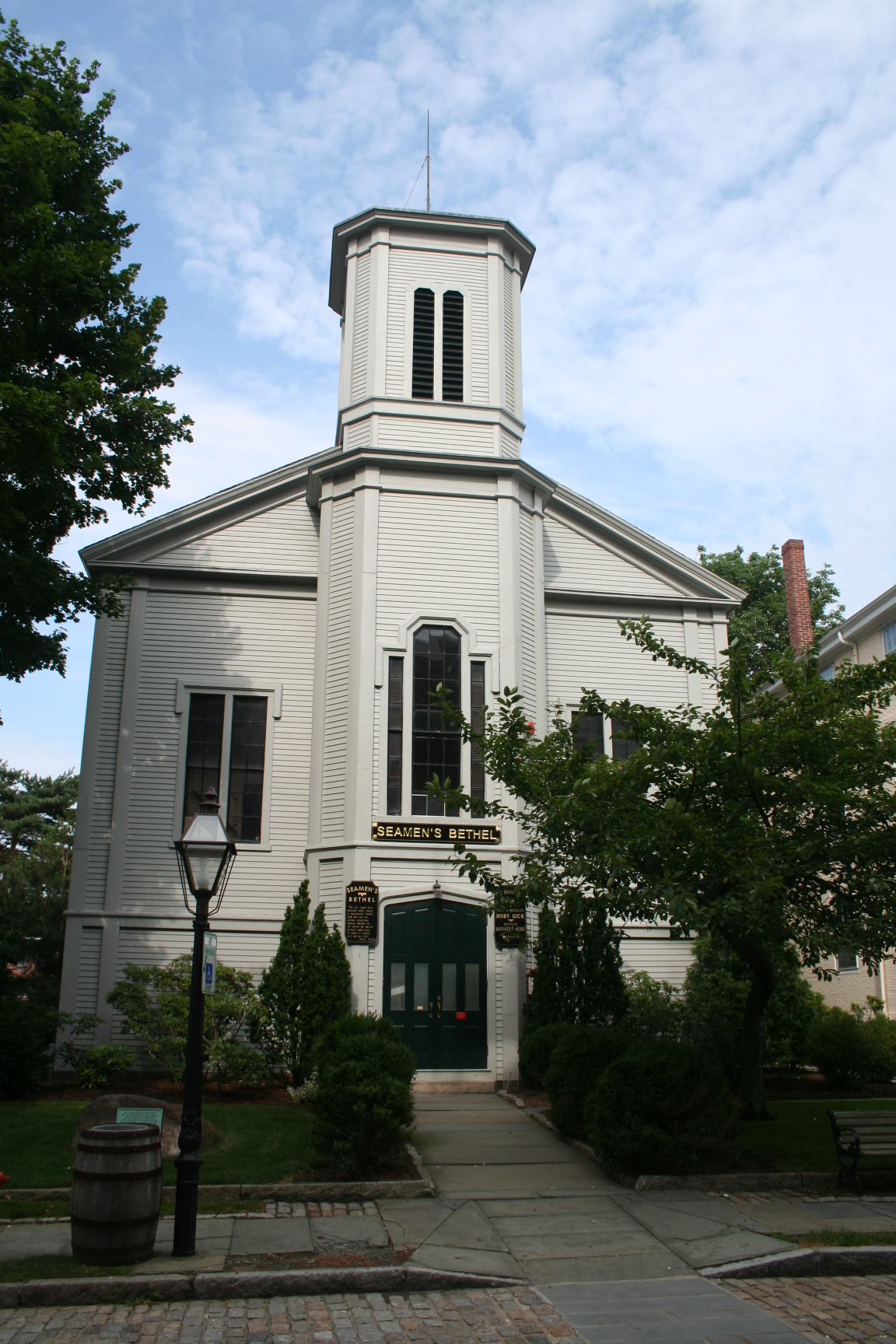
Exterior

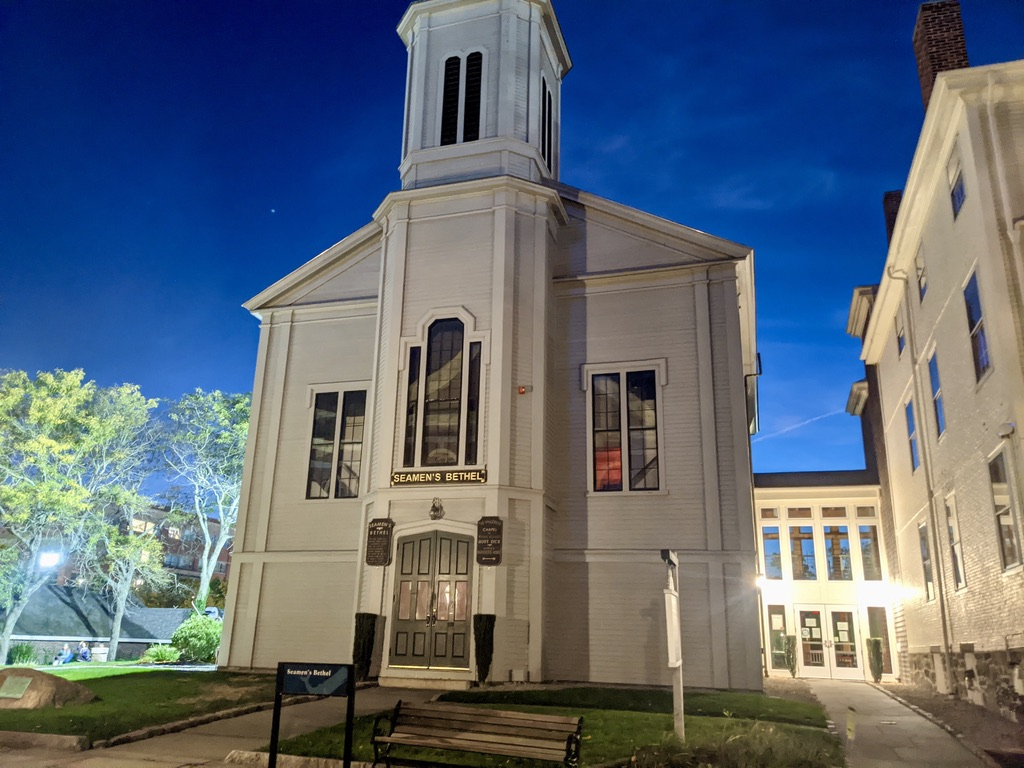
Exterior at Night

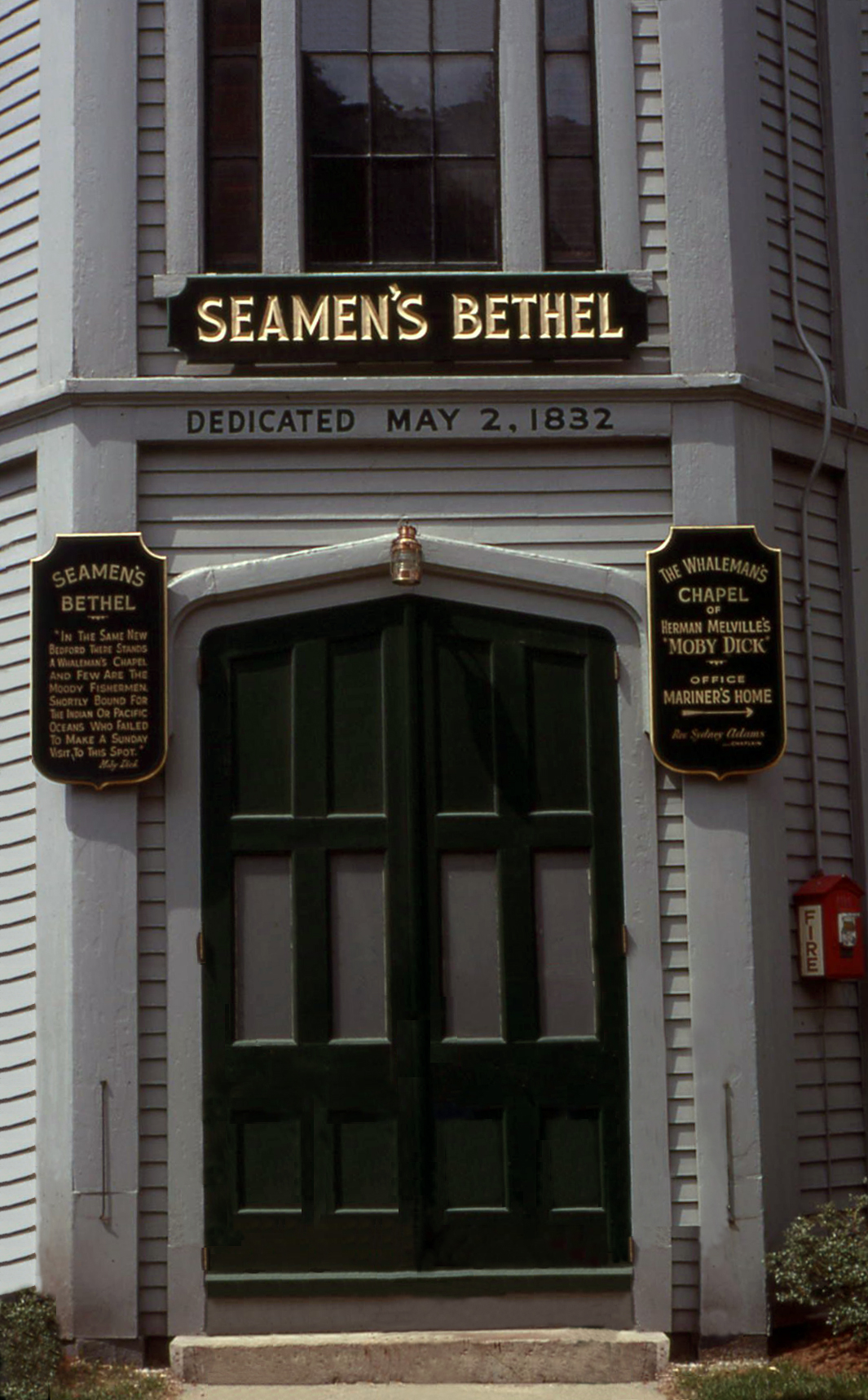
Plaques at the doorway, as seen in 1968

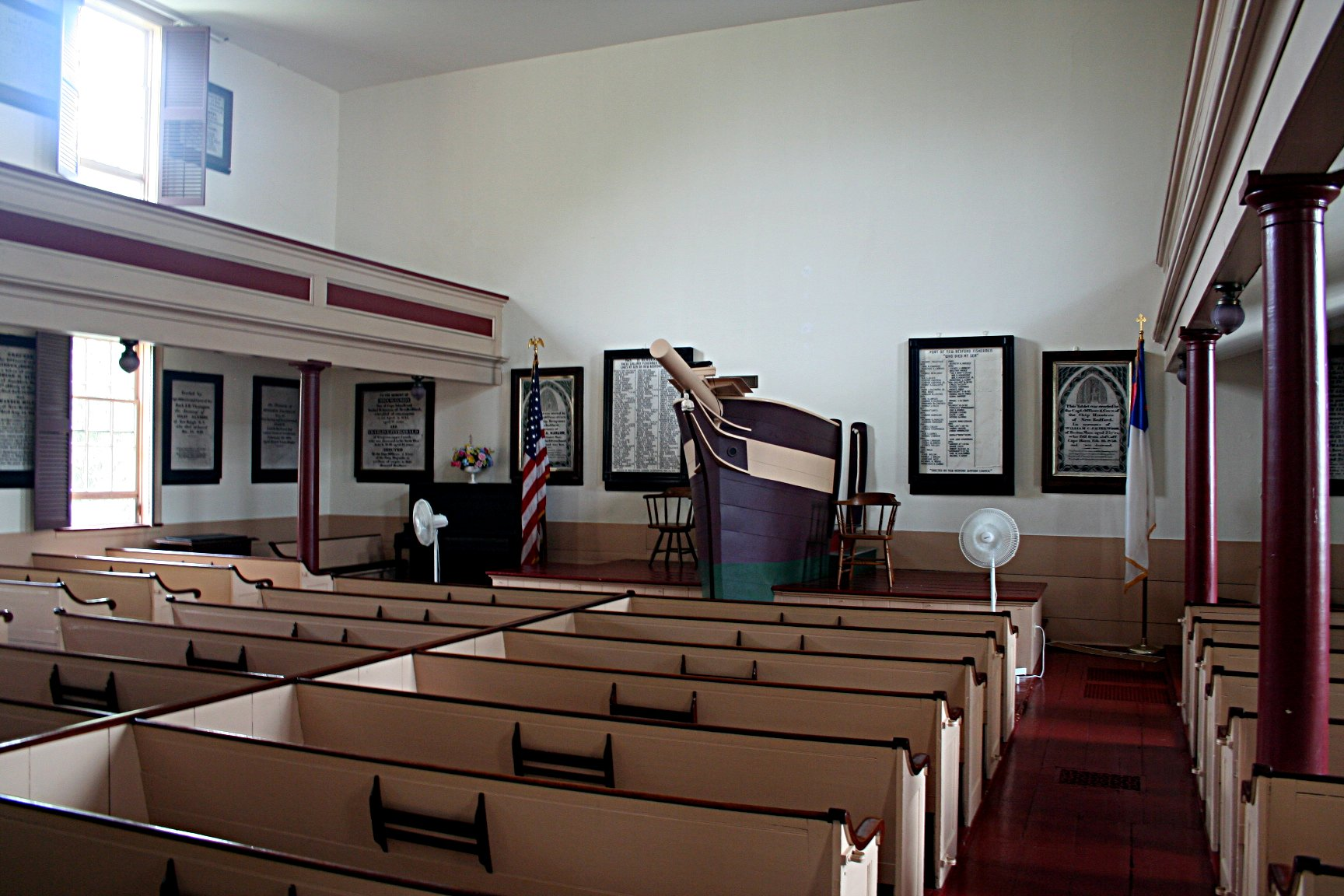
interior, with the bow-shaped pulpit in front

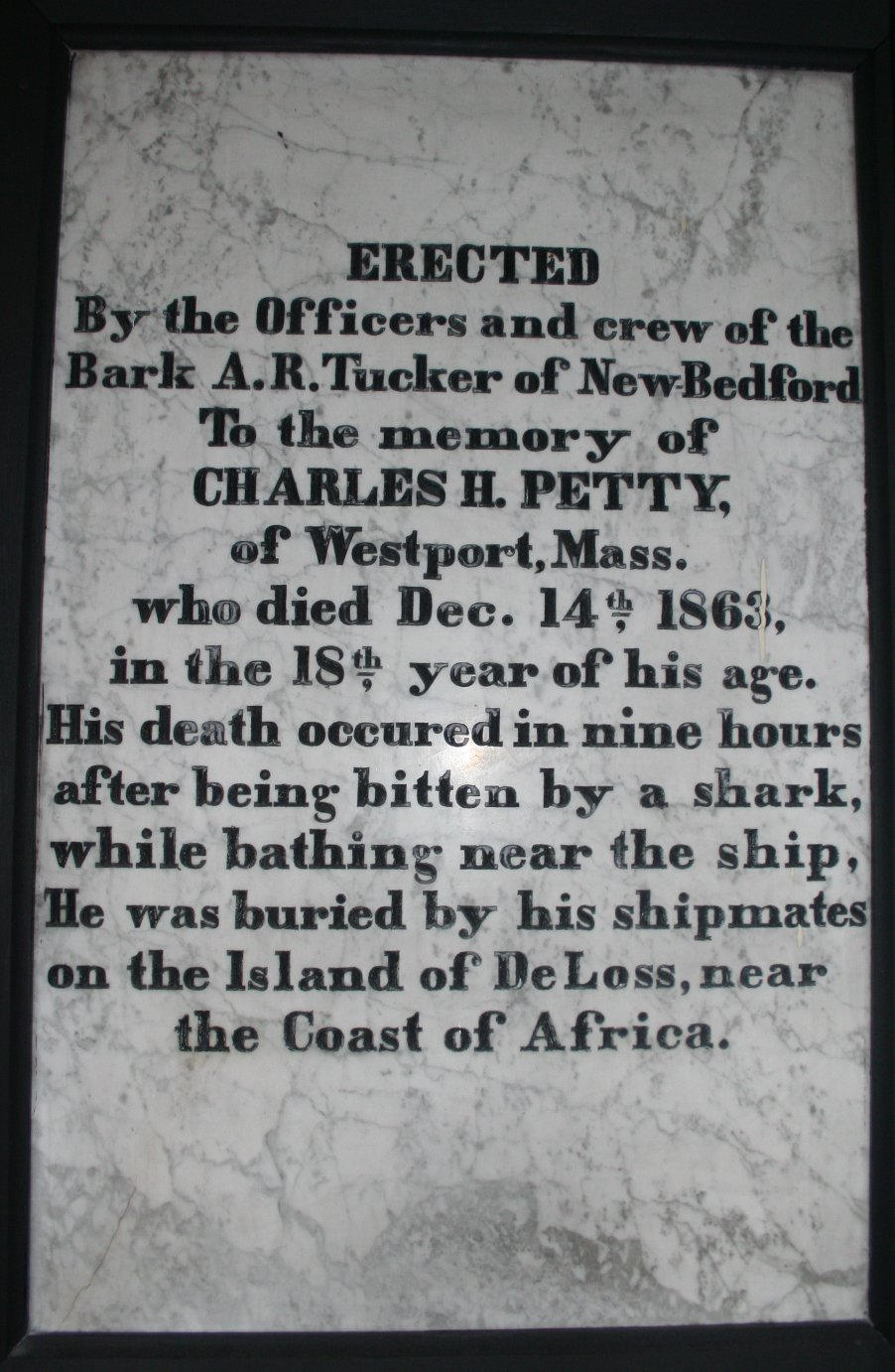
Cenotaph

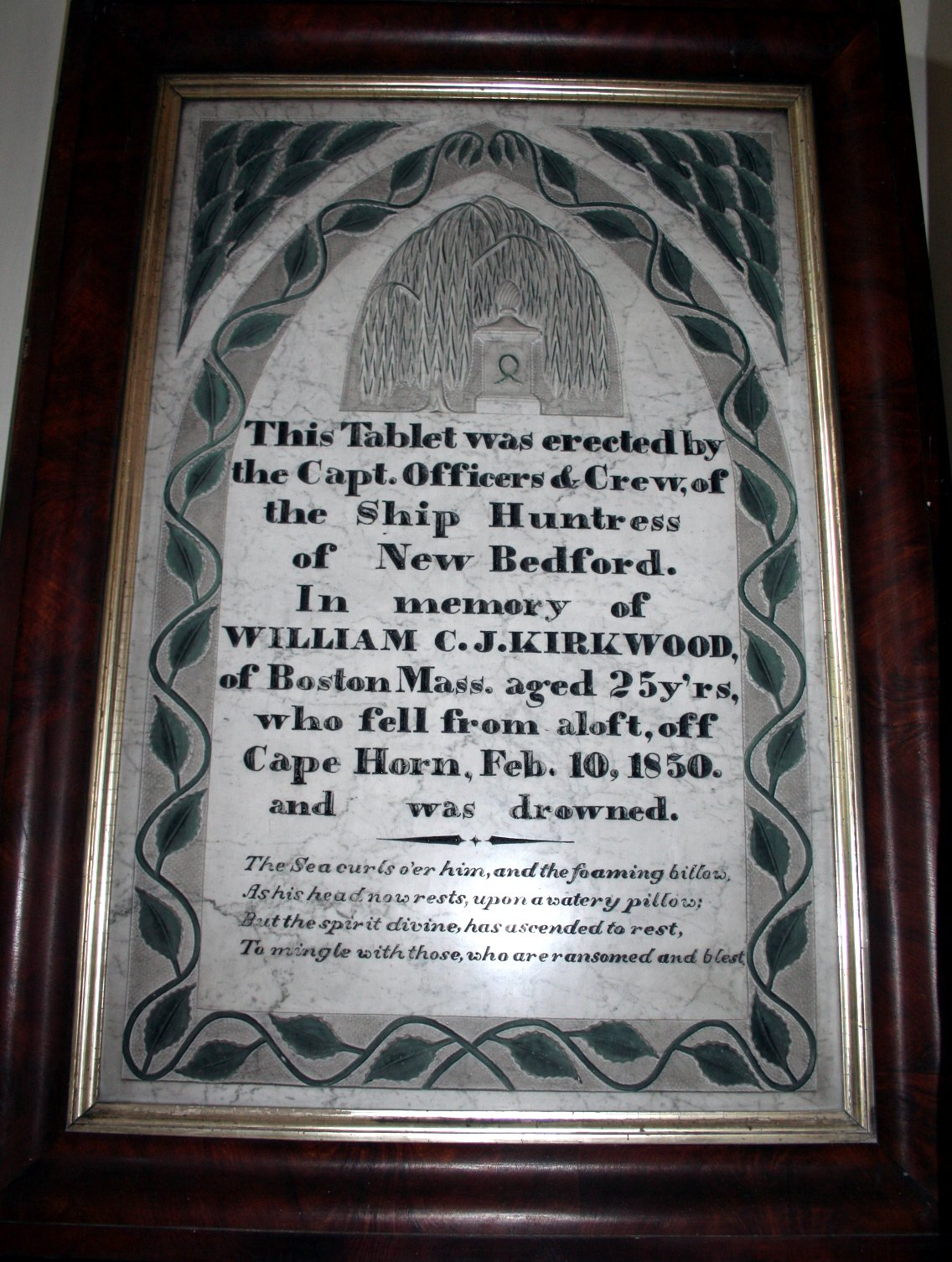
Cenotaph

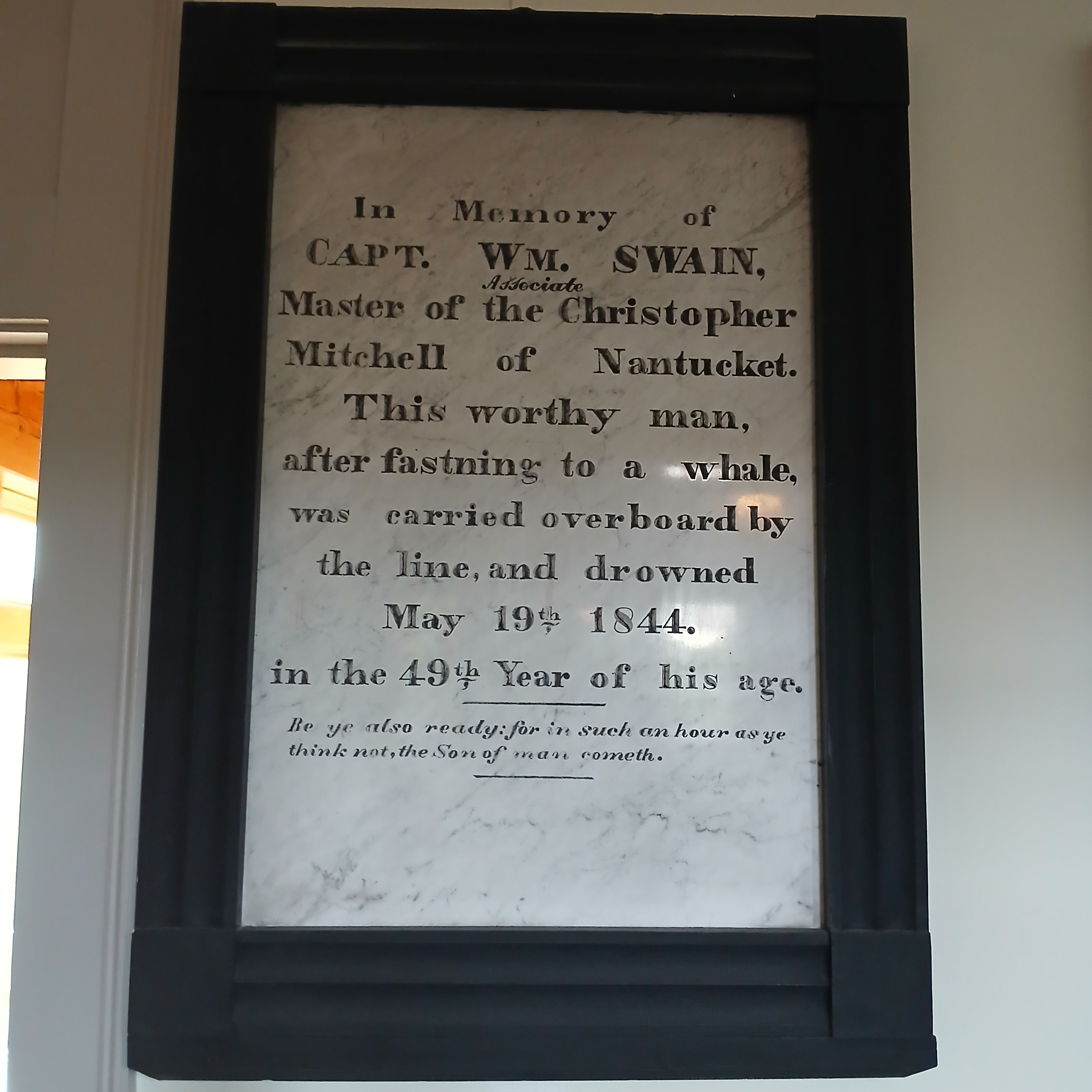
Cenotaph describing an 1844 death that parallels the death of Captain Ahab in Melville's 1851 novel Moby-Dick
