= Central New Bedford Historic District =

Historic district in Massachusetts, United States

- U.S. National Register of Historic Places
- U.S. Historic district
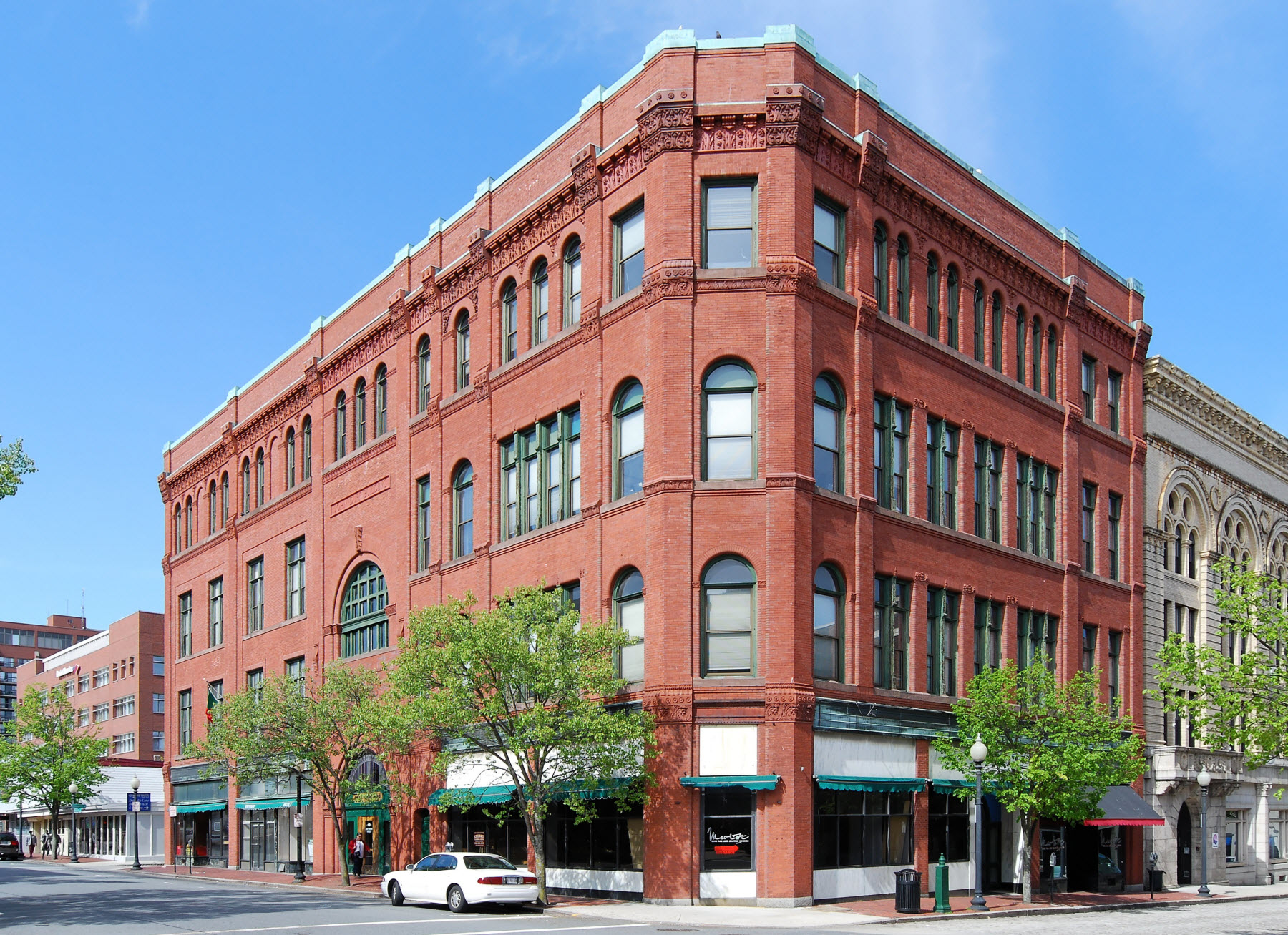
- John Duff Building

- Location within Massachusetts Location within the United States
- Location: New Bedford, Massachusetts
- Coordinates: 41°38′6″N 70°55′39″W
- Area: 29 acres (12 ha)
- Built: ca 1890s
- Architect: Peabody & Stearns; Et al.
- Architectural style: Classical Revival, Greek Revival, Romanesque
- NRHP reference No.: 80000430
- Added to NRHP: April 24, 1980

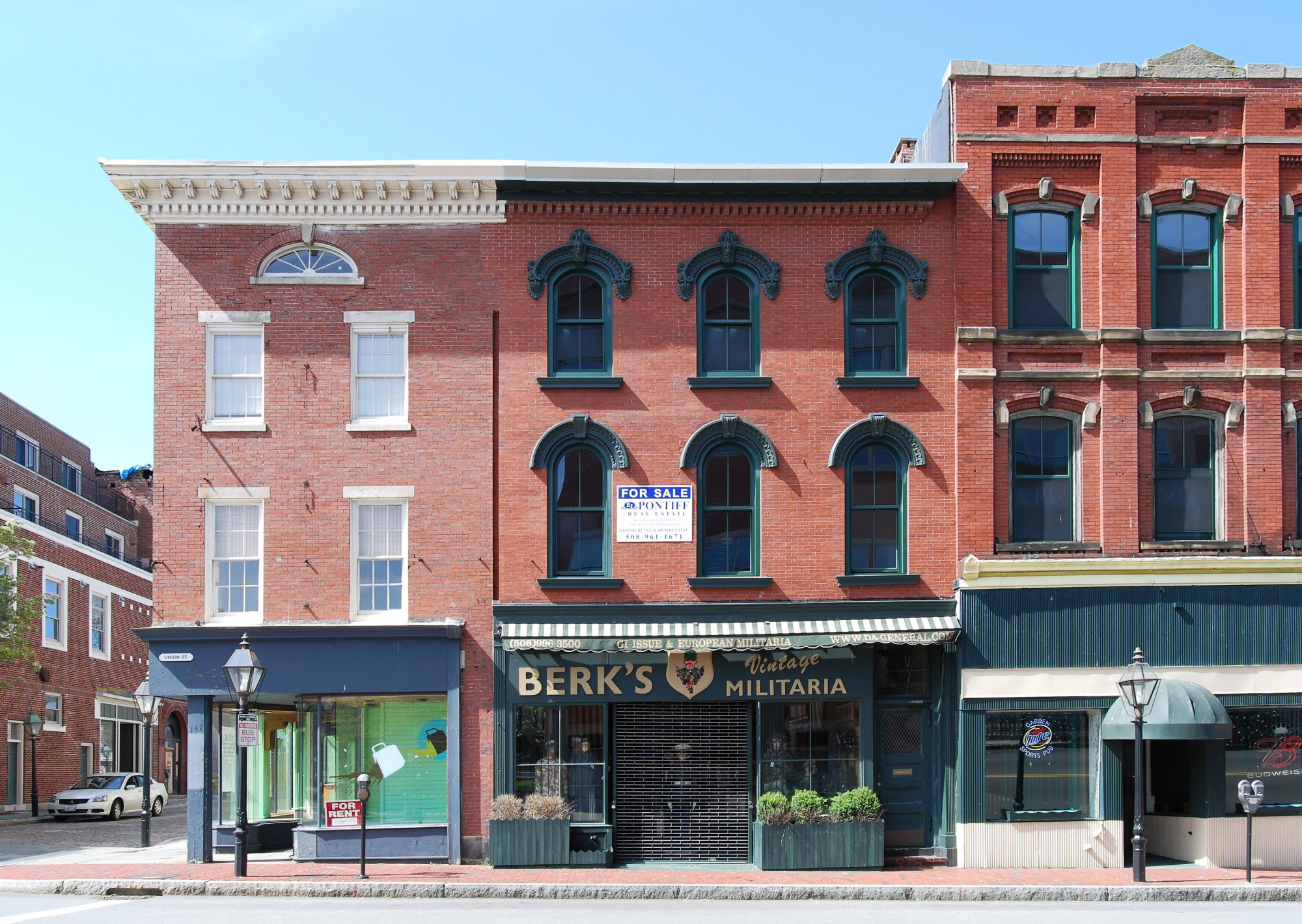
Union Street

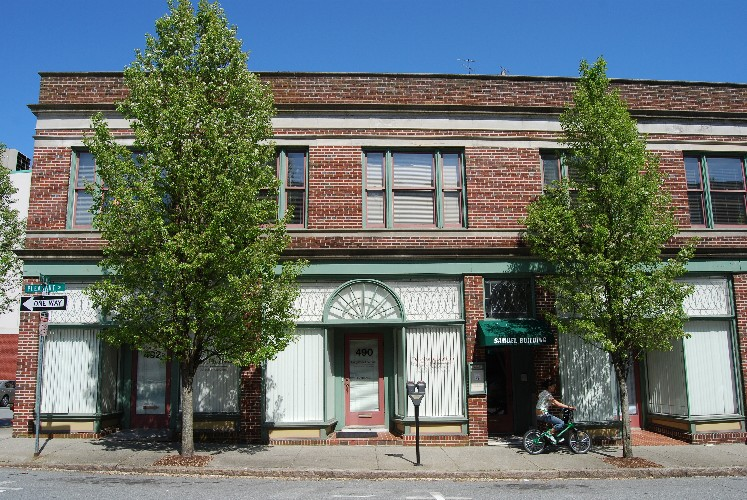
Samuel Building

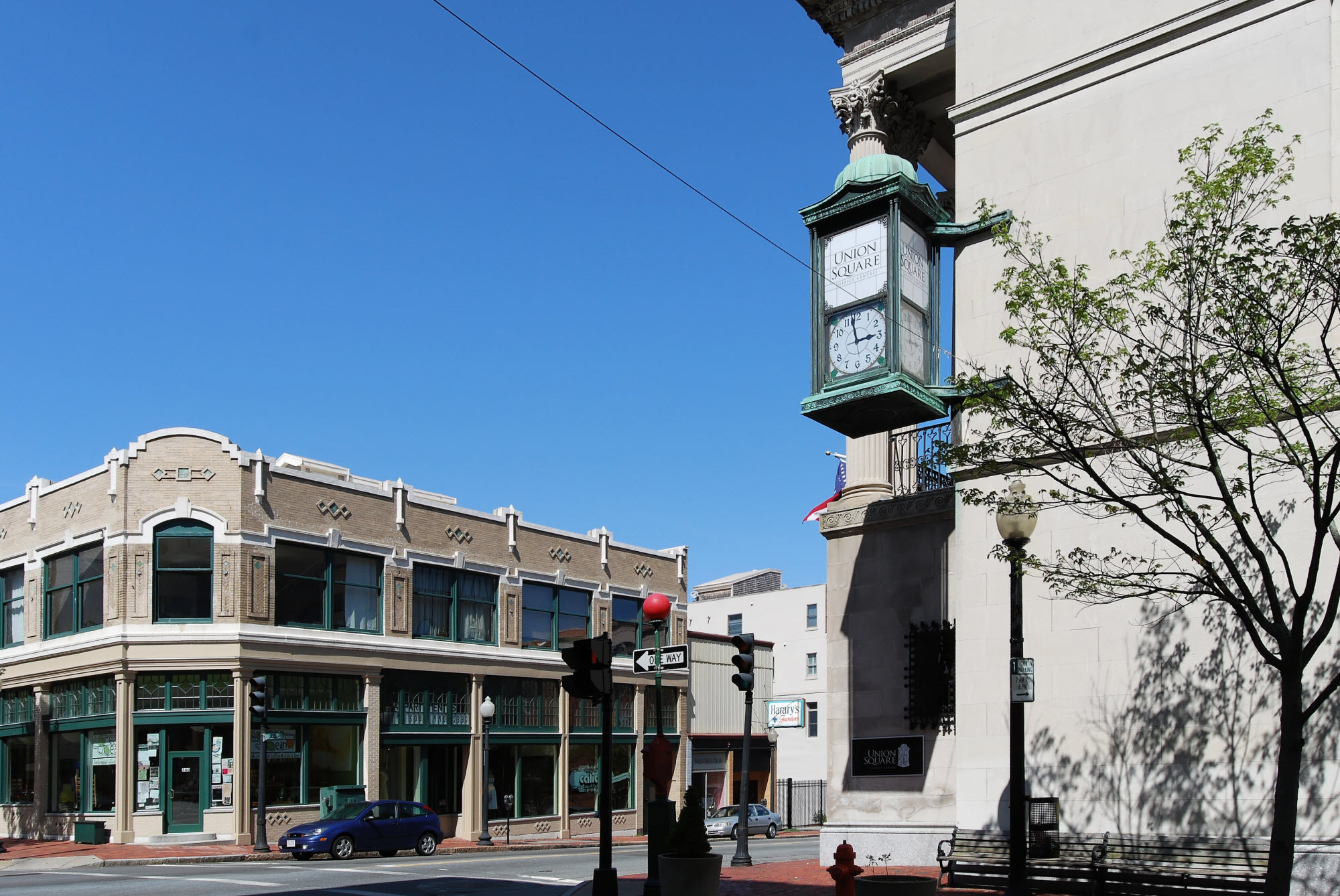
Union Square

The Central New Bedford Historic District is one of nine historic districts in New Bedford, Massachusetts, United States. The district encompasses the city's central business district, built up during the time in the late 19th century when textiles had replaced whaling as the city's main industry. It is a 29-acre (12 ha) rectangular area bounded by Acushnet Avenue and the older New Bedford Historic District on the east, School Street to the south, Middle Street on the north and 6th Street (and the County Street Historic District) in the west. It was added to the National Register of Historic Places in 1980.

== Description and history ==
The city of New Bedford began as an agrarian community in the 17th century, and rose in the late 18th century to become the preeminent center of the whaling industry. This focused urban development near its waterfront, an area that is now represented by the New Bedford Historic District, a National Historic Landmark. When whaling began to decline in the mid-19th century, the city's economy turned to textiles, which resulted in a second commercial building boom, and the creation of the city's modern business district. This area is inland, south and west of the original whaling center. Its major roadways are 6th Street, running north–south, and Union Street, running east–west. Within the district are 79 buildings, mostly commercial or mixed-use, including New Bedford's city hall. A few older buildings are in the Greek Revival style, but most are either Classical Revival or Romanesque Revival, styles more common in the late 19th century.

The principal cluster of municipal and civic buildings is located between Pleasant and 6th Streets at the northern end of the district. At the far north is the Post Office, a Classical Revival building designed by Oscar Wenderoth and built in 1915. New Bedford City Hall occupies an entire city block between Elm and William Streets; it is a Renaissance Revival building built 1855–56, and greatly enlarged after a fire gutted the building in 1906. Immediately to its south, across William Street, is the Free Public Library, a cruciform Greek Revival building with a temple front; it was designed by Russell Warren and built in 1838–39, serving as the first city hall. Across 6th Street, behind the library, stands the Classical Revival Registry of Deeds, designed by Samuel C. Hunt and built in 1908–10.

== See also ==
- National Register of Historic Places listings in New Bedford, Massachusetts
