= New Bedford Whaling National Historical Park =

US National Historical Park in Massachusetts

- New Bedford Whaling; National Historical Park
- U.S. National Register of Historic Places
- U.S. National Historical Park
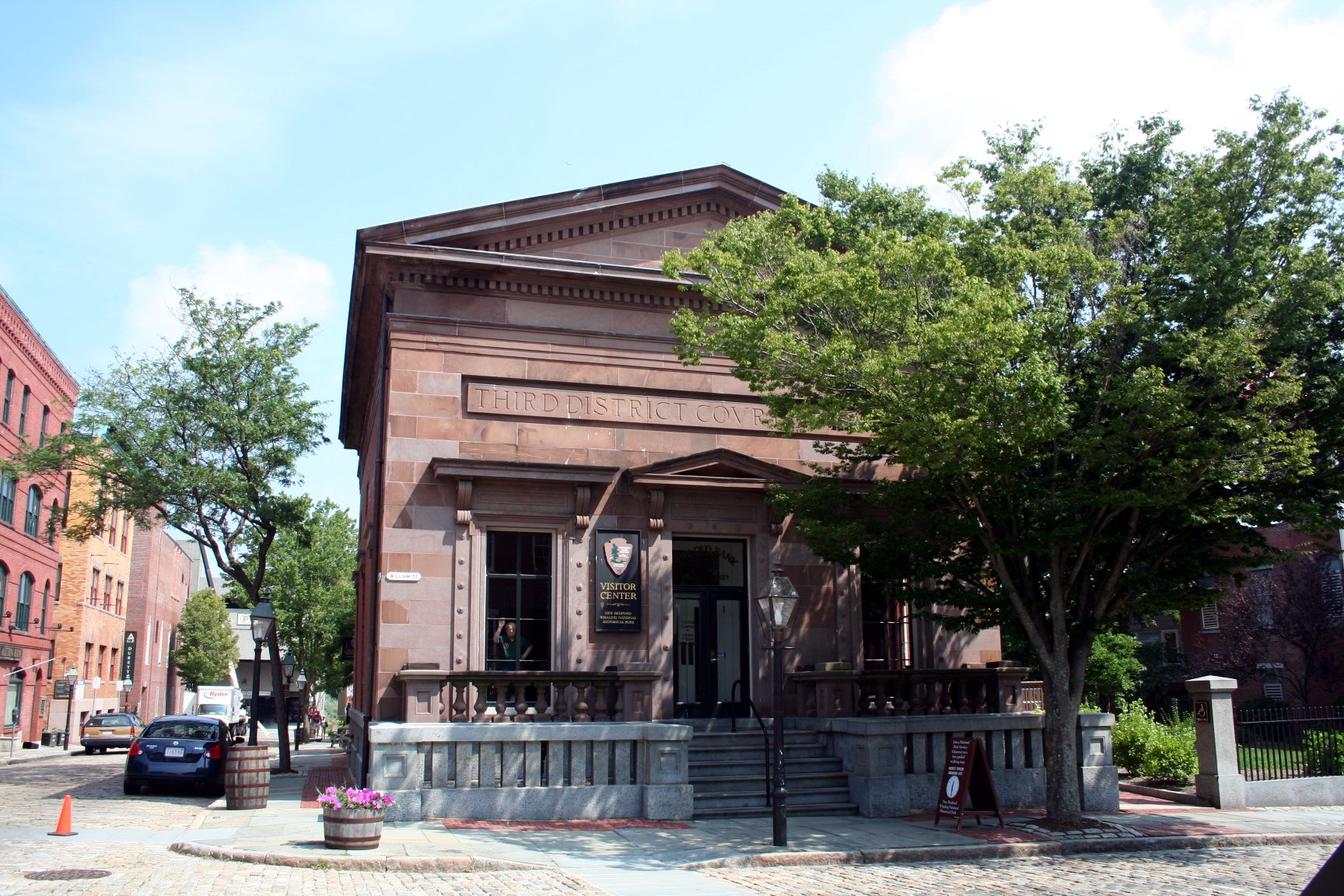
- New Bedford Whaling National Historical Park Visitor Center

- Location within Massachusetts Location within the United States
- Location: New Bedford, Massachusetts, United States
- Coordinates: 41°38′08″N 70°55′24″W
- Area: 34 acres (14 ha)
- Built: 1790–1855
- Architect: Robert Mills, Richard Upjohn, Russell Warren, others
- Architectural style: Federal, Greek Revival, Italianate
- Visitation: 273,862 (2011)
- Website: New Bedford Whaling National Historical Park
- NRHP reference No.: 03000283
- Added to NRHP: 1996

New Bedford Whaling National Historical Park is a United States National Historical Park in New Bedford, Massachusetts. Partially owned by several entities and maintained by the National Park Service (NPS), the park commemorates the heritage of the world's preeminent whaling port during the nineteenth century.

Established in 1996, the park encompasses 34 acres (fourteen hectares) dispersed over 13 city blocks. It includes a visitor center, the New Bedford National Historic Landmark District, the New Bedford Whaling Museum, the Seamen's Bethel, the schooner Ernestina, and the Rotch–Jones–Duff House and Garden Museum. The only parts owned by the NPS are the Visitor Center and the Corson Maritime Learning Center.

The park is a historic district administered under a partnership between the NPS, the City of New Bedford, and private building owners to preserve the historic landscapes, structures, and collections and promote research and educational programming associated with the history of whaling.

The enabling legislation also established a formal affiliation with the Iñupiat Heritage Center in Utqiaġvik, Alaska, to commemorate the 2,000-plus whaling voyages from New Bedford to the Western Arctic.

The city markets the park as "New England's real seaport", drawing a distinction with Connecticut's Mystic Seaport Museum, which is a collection of historic buildings and vessels moved from various other locations throughout the region.

A monument to whalers, called The Whaleman, stands two blocks west of the park, at the corner of William and Pleasant Streets in front of the New Bedford Public Library.

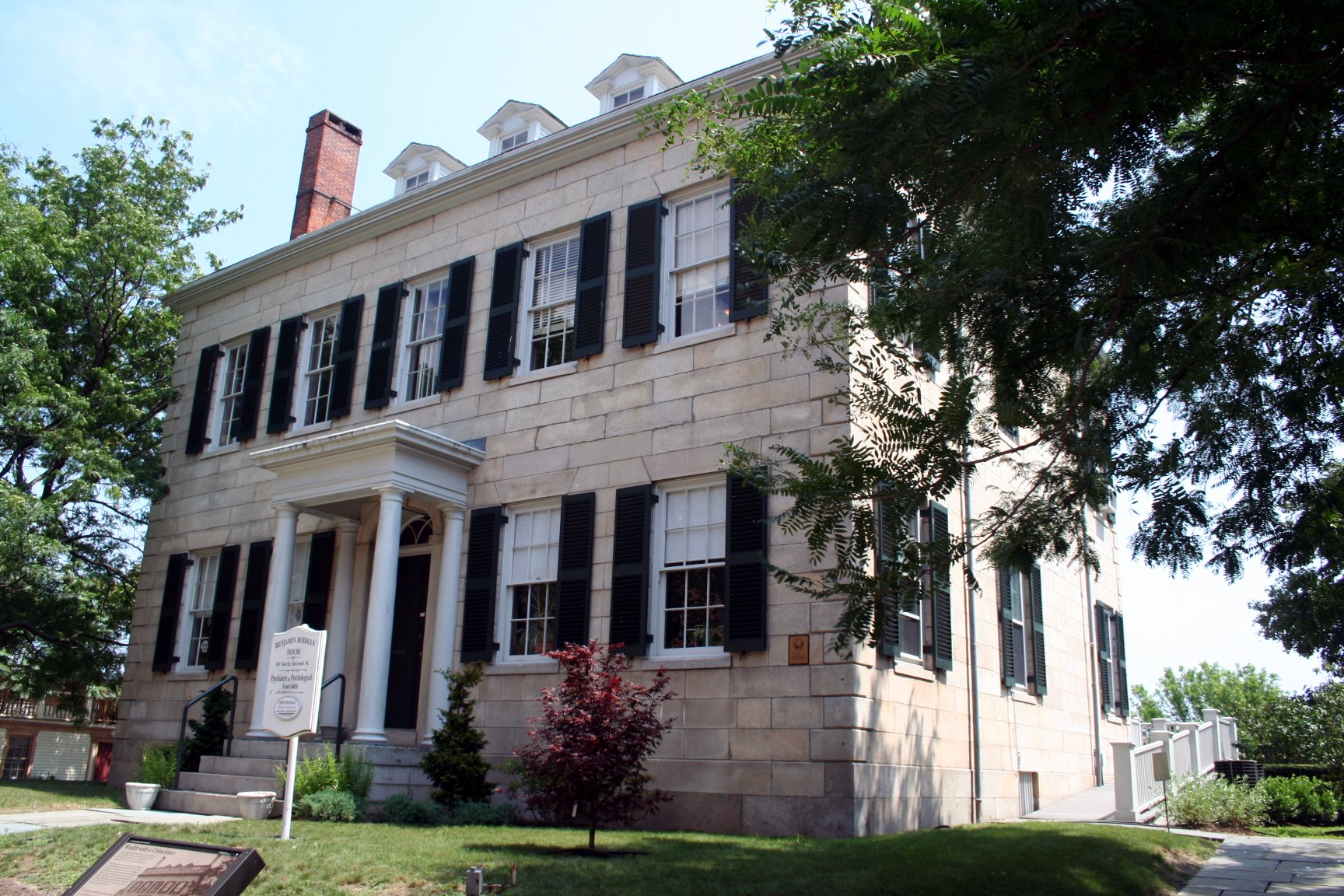
Benjamin Rodman Mansion

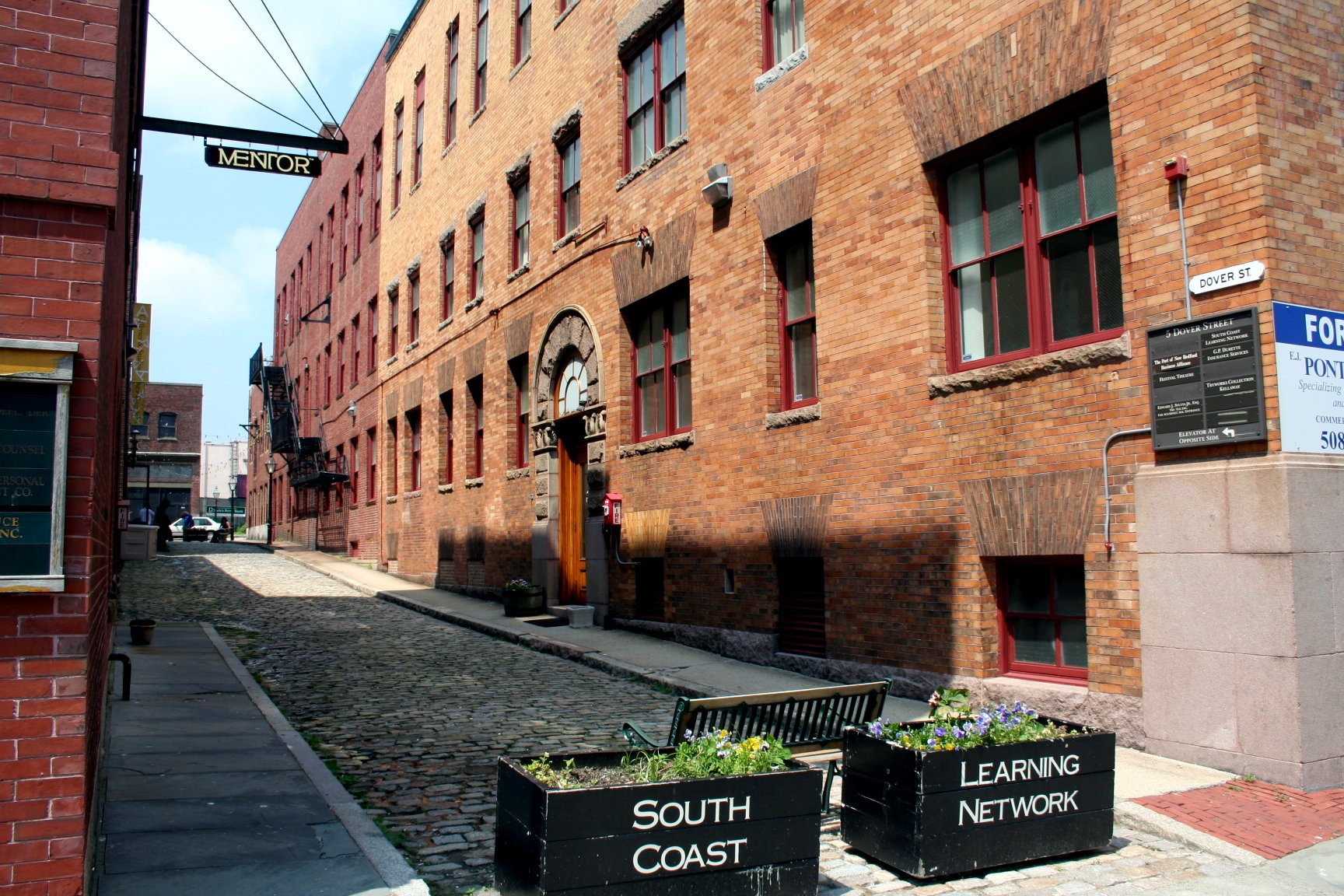
Dover Street

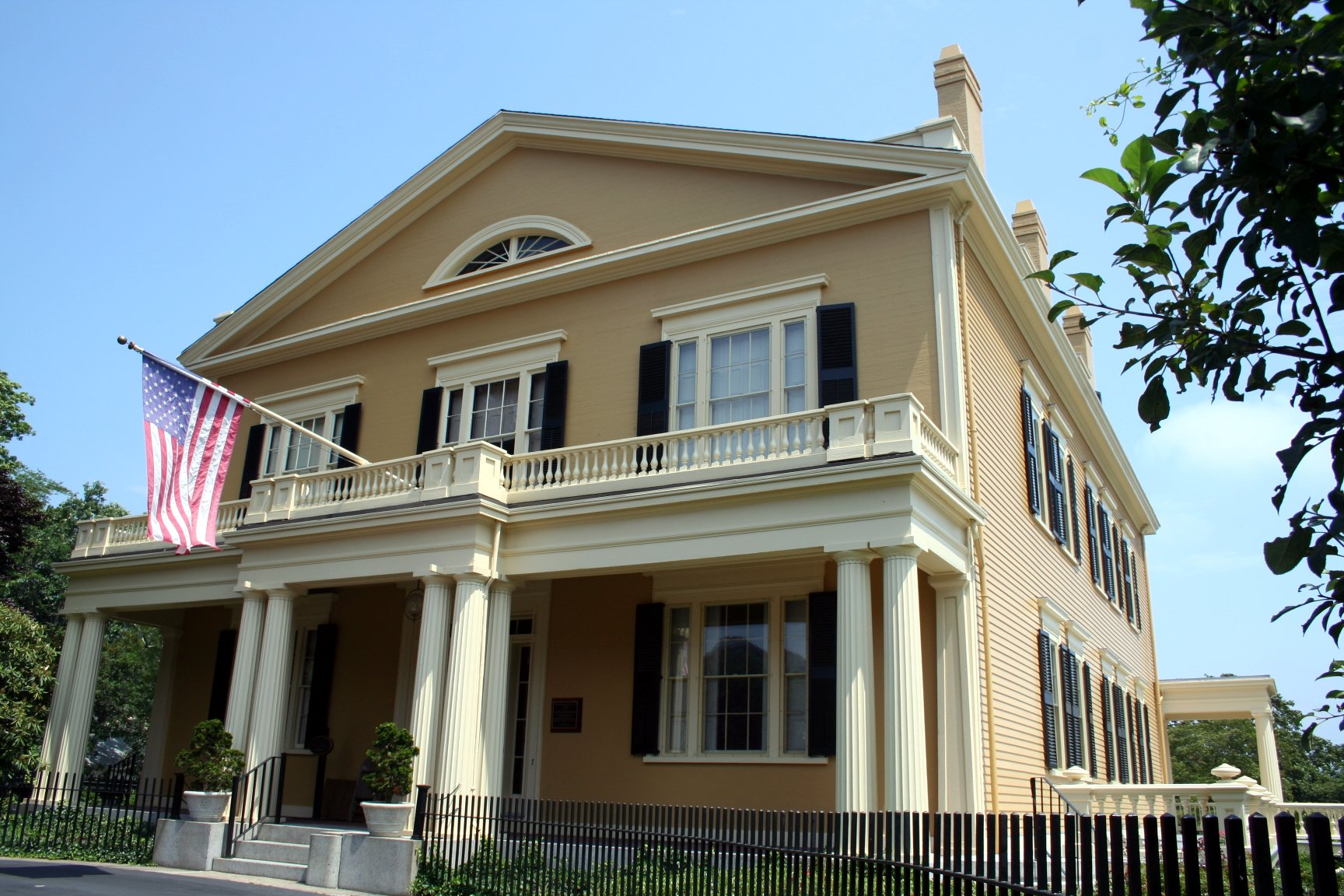
Rotch-Jones House

== See also ==
- Merrill's Wharf Historic District
- New Bedford Whaling Museum
- National Register of Historic Places listings in New Bedford, Massachusetts
