= Rotch–Jones–Duff House and Garden Museum =

Historic house in Massachusetts, United States

- William Rotch Jr. House
- U.S. National Register of Historic Places
- U.S. National Historic Landmark
- U.S. Historic district – Contributing property
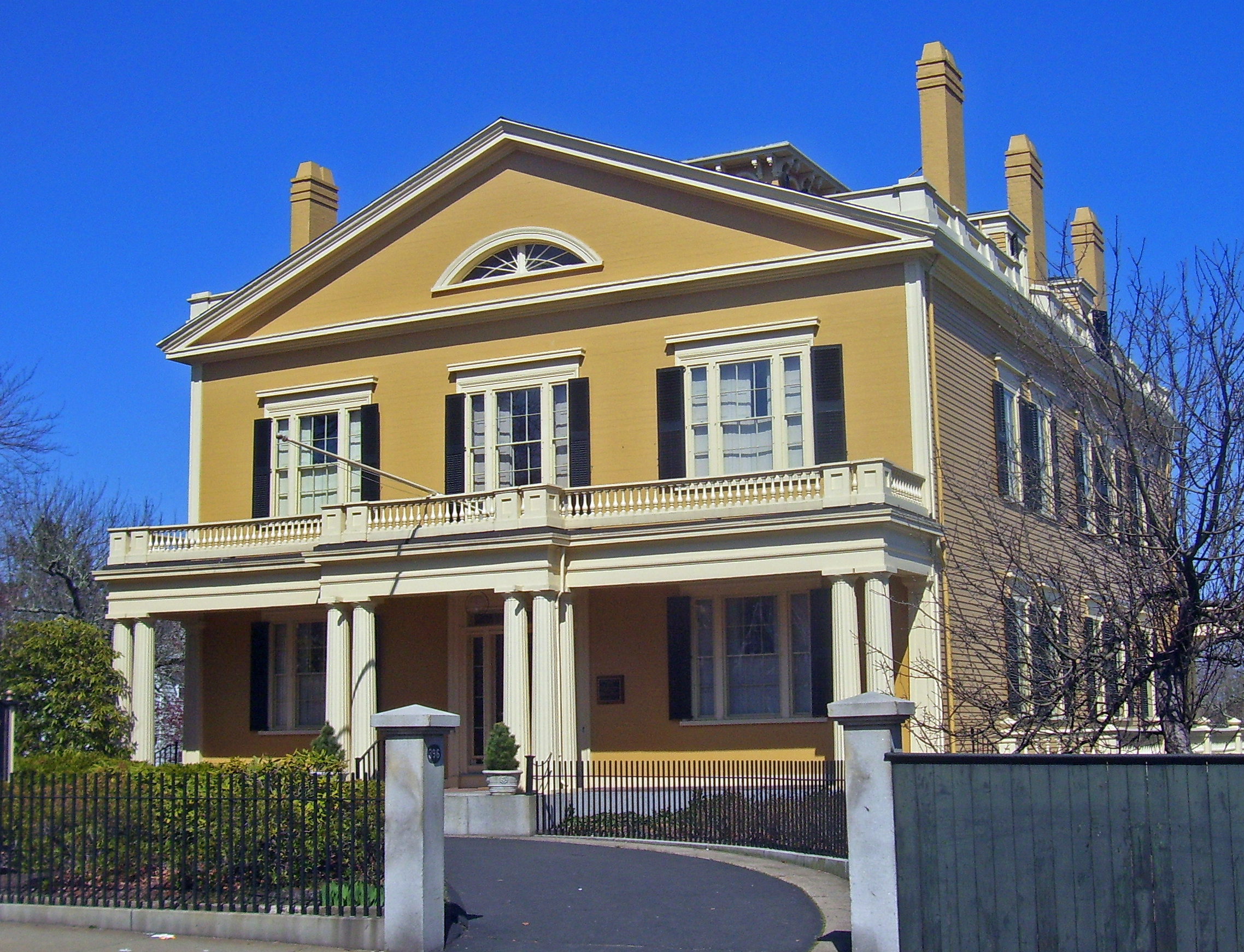
- Front (west) elevation, 2008

- Location within Massachusetts Location within the United States
- Location: 396 County Street, New Bedford, MA
- Coordinates: 41°37′49″N 70°55′42″W
- Area: 1 acre (4,000 m²)
- Built: 1834
- Architect: Richard Upjohn
- Architectural style: Greek Revival
- Part of: County Street Historic District (ID76000229)
- NRHP reference No.: 05000456

Significant dates
- Added to NRHP: April 5, 2005
- Designated NHL: April 5, 2005
- Designated CP: August 11, 1976

The Rotch–Jones–Duff House and Garden Museum, formerly the William Rotch Jr. House, is a National Historic Landmark at 396 County Street in New Bedford, Massachusetts, in the United States. The three families whose names are attached to it were all closely tied to the city's nineteenth-century dominance of the whaling industry. Because of this, the house is part of the New Bedford Whaling National Historical Park.

Richard Upjohn built the house in the Greek Revival architectural style for William Rotch Jr. in 1834, on a New Bedford plot Rotch had inherited from his father. It was Upjohn's first house, near the beginning of a long career. Rotch also commissioned a garden in the rear, which later owners would significantly expand. The property remained private until 1981, when it was bought by local preservationists and reopened as a historic house museum. It was declared a National Historic Landmark and added to the National Register of Historic Places in 2005. Today the museum educates visitors not only about whaling but, through its gardens and associated programs for local schools, about the environment as well.

== Property ==
The house sits on a one-acre (4,000 m^{2}) block of New Bedford, between County, Madison, Joli Gonsalves and Seventh streets, in the middle of the County Street Historic District, where its wealthy citizens built their mansions in the 19th century. It is a three-by-five-bay two-story yellow building with a front porch and balustraded balcony on either end and several tall chimneys emerging from the roof. Inside, many of the original mahogany doors and their walnut veneers remain. The cornerblocks and baseboards have elliptical echinus profiles of the kind commonly found in many Greek Revival interiors. The window muntins have a beaded knife blade profile and the plaster ceiling cornices and medallions also have finely carved ornamentation.

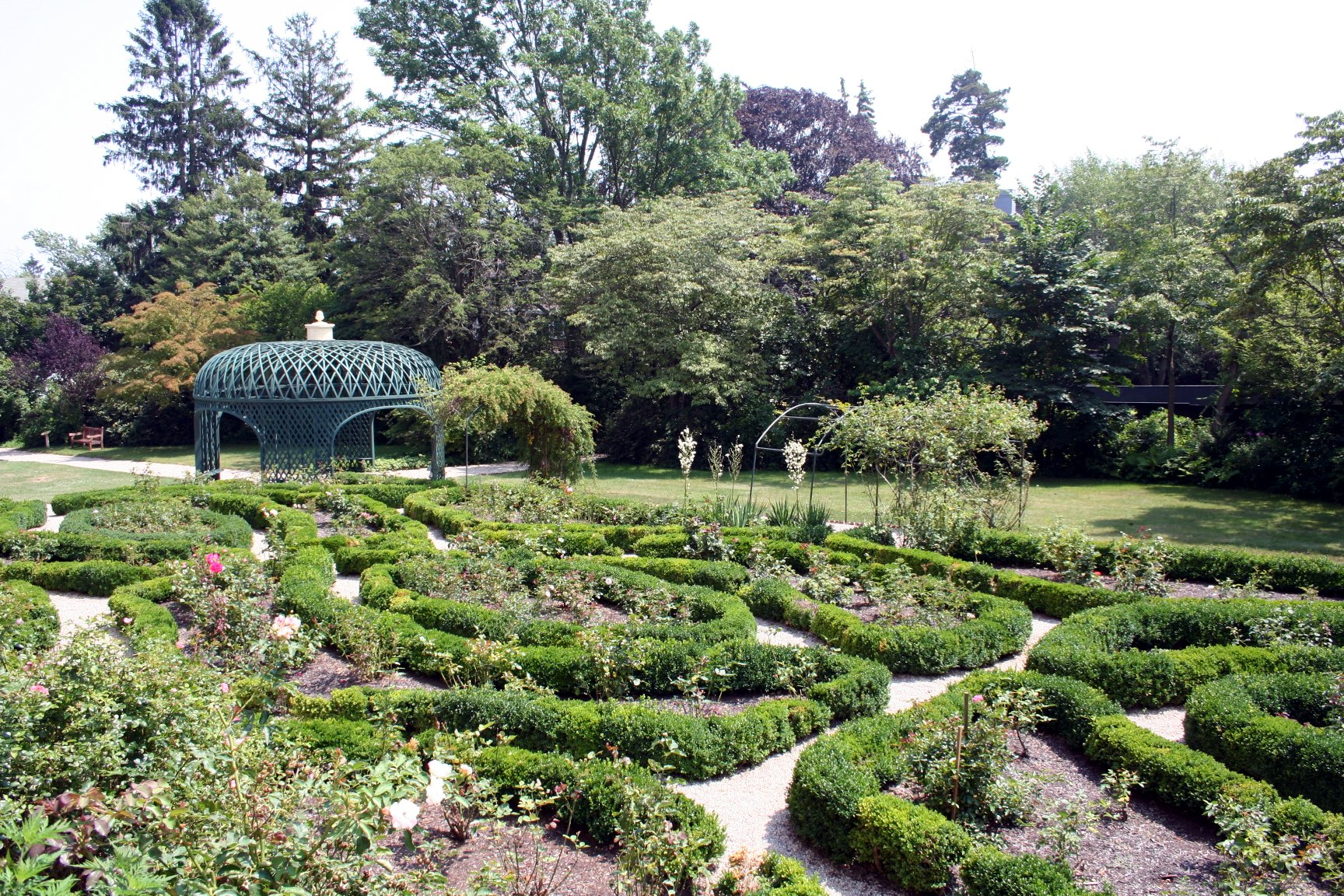
The garden

A circular driveway leads up to the house, set back a mere 40 feet (12 m) from the street to allow for outbuildings and the property's garden. It includes elements of all three of its periods of private ownership: a formal boxwood rose parterre garden with tall calla lilies, boxwood specimen garden, cutting garden and Woodland Walk surrounding a 19th-century wooden latticework pergola.

== History ==
Joseph Rotch, William's grandfather, had been one of the early settlers in New Bedford when the town began to grow in the 1760s. He had realized, along with Joseph Russell, a major area landowner, that the town was well-positioned to become a whaling center, potentially surpassing even Nantucket, then the center of the industry in the colonies. Unlike the island, it had a deep harbor where ocean-going vessels could come directly to port and unload their harvest.

Despite some setbacks during the Revolution and War of 1812, the city's whaling fleet kept growing and by the late 1820s had begun catching up to Nantucket's. Ship captains and owners grew wealthy and built themselves homes in the County Street area. "Nowhere in all America", Herman Melville later wrote in Moby-Dick, "will you find more patrician-like houses; parks and gardens more opulent, than in New Bedford ... all these brave houses and flowery gardens..." The Rotches, who practiced vertical integration and had interests at every step of the whaling process, grew very wealthy.

Joseph's son William died in 1828 and left his own son, William Jr., the plot on which the present house was built. Three years later the deed was formally transferred to the younger man, who had already distinguished himself in New Bedford's civic life by helping to found banks and schools, upon the execution of his father's estate. He hired a young English immigrant named Richard Upjohn to design a house on the plot, insisting it be more modest and restrained than its neighbors, even though he was the third-wealthiest man in the city after his late father and brother-in-law. As a founder of the New Bedford Horticultural Society, he began the specimen garden in the back of the property.

By 1851, New Bedford had completely displaced Nantucket as the center of American whaling. In that year, Edward Coffin Jones, a Nantucket native who had moved to New Bedford and become a successful ship owner, bought the house for $17,000. The Joneses expanded the garden, adding the pergola, a common Victorian touch. One of his daughters, Amelia Hickling Jones, lived there for the next 85 years, becoming a major civic benefactor as the city transitioned from whaling to textiles as the mainstay of its economy. With no heirs, the property was put up for sale when she died in 1935.

Mark Duff, a descendant of one of New Bedford's whaling families that had expanded into other businesses, bought it the following year. Under the direction of Boston landscape architect, Mrs. Helen Seymour Coolidge, they redecorated it extensively and planted 7,000 tulip bulbs in the garden, as well as adding landscaping, walkways and ornamental ponds.

The Duff family decided to sell the house in 1981, and it was bought by the Waterfront Historic Area LeaguE (WHALE), a local historic preservation group that had been instrumental in restoring, protecting and establishing the nearby New Bedford Historic District, a National Historic Landmark (NHL). WHALE's goal was to save it from commercial development and turn the house and garden into a museum, which it opened in 1983. In 1996 it became the only city property outside of the New Bedford Historic District to be included as part of New Bedford Whaling National Historical Park, and in 2005 the house and garden were themselves designated an NHL, as a legacy of New Bedford's whaling supremacy, an outstanding example of a Greek Revival house, and the first house built by Upjohn.

== Museum ==
The museum and garden are open daily (except major holidays) year-round. Admission is charged except for the second Thursday evening of every month except January, when it is free.

Several educational programs are available, using the house and gardens to teach students in grades 4-6 about botany, beekeeping and whaling, with teacher support material available online. High school and college students may work as interns. The grounds and gardens are also available for weddings, wedding photos and other ceremonies or occasions.

== See also ==
- William J. Rotch Gothic Cottage, also a National Historic Landmark
- List of National Historic Landmarks in Massachusetts
- National Register of Historic Places listings in New Bedford, Massachusetts
