= Waterfront Historic Area League =

Non-profit historic preservation organization

Waterfront Historic Area LeaguE
- Abbreviation: WHALE
- Formation: 1962
- Founder: George Perkins, Stephen Delano, and Peter Grinnell
- Legal status: 501(c)(3) organization
- Purpose: Historic Preservation
- Headquarters: 15 Johnny Cake Hill, New Bedford, Massachusetts
- Coordinates: 41.635308°N 70.923724°W
- Members: ≈872
- Executive Director: Erin D. A. Miranda
- President: Diana Henry
- Website: https://waterfrontleague.org/

The Waterfront Historic Area LeaguE, also known as WHALE, is a non-profit historic preservation organization located in New Bedford, Massachusetts. Its mission is: "to promote the value and reuse of greater New Bedford's historic structures through preservation, education and advocacy". The organization often promotes its cause with the words of Sarah Delano (President of WHALE, 1966-1982). Delano said, "If you bulldoze your heritage, you become just anywhere".

== History ==
=== 20th century ===
The organization was founded by a group of concerned citizens in 1962, at a time when urban renewal threatened much of the city's history and architectural heritage. The original focus was on the city's waterfront district, a dense area of whaling era buildings suffering from severe neglect and disrepair. WHALE took on the preservation/restoration of as many as 20 buildings within the district's boundaries over the years. This became the organization's first neighborhood revitalization project and lead to the establishment of Bedford Landing Waterfront National Register Historic District. With WHALE's leadership, the district would later be designated New Bedford Whaling National Historical Park. Over time, WHALE expanded to properties beyond this district, taking on preservation projects throughout the city. Since their founding in 1962, WHALE has facilitated the completion of more than 72 restoration and preservation projects in the New Bedford area.

=== 21st century ===
In November 2023, WHALE received the Trustees’ Award for Organizational Excellence from the National Trust for Historic Preservation, who commended WHALE for its "tireless commitment to preservation".

== Projects ==
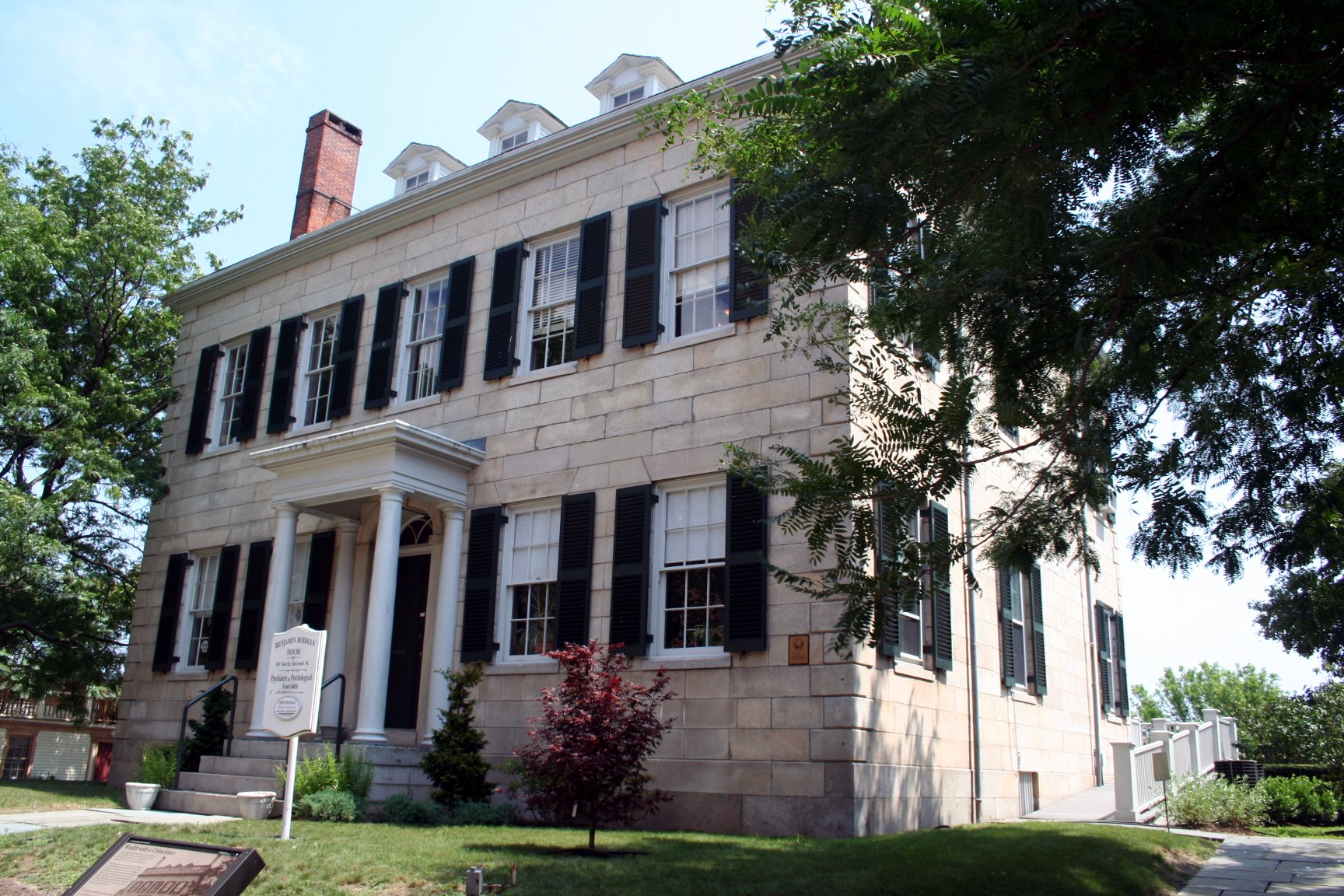
Benjamin Rodman House, 50 North Second Street in New Bedford, Massachusetts

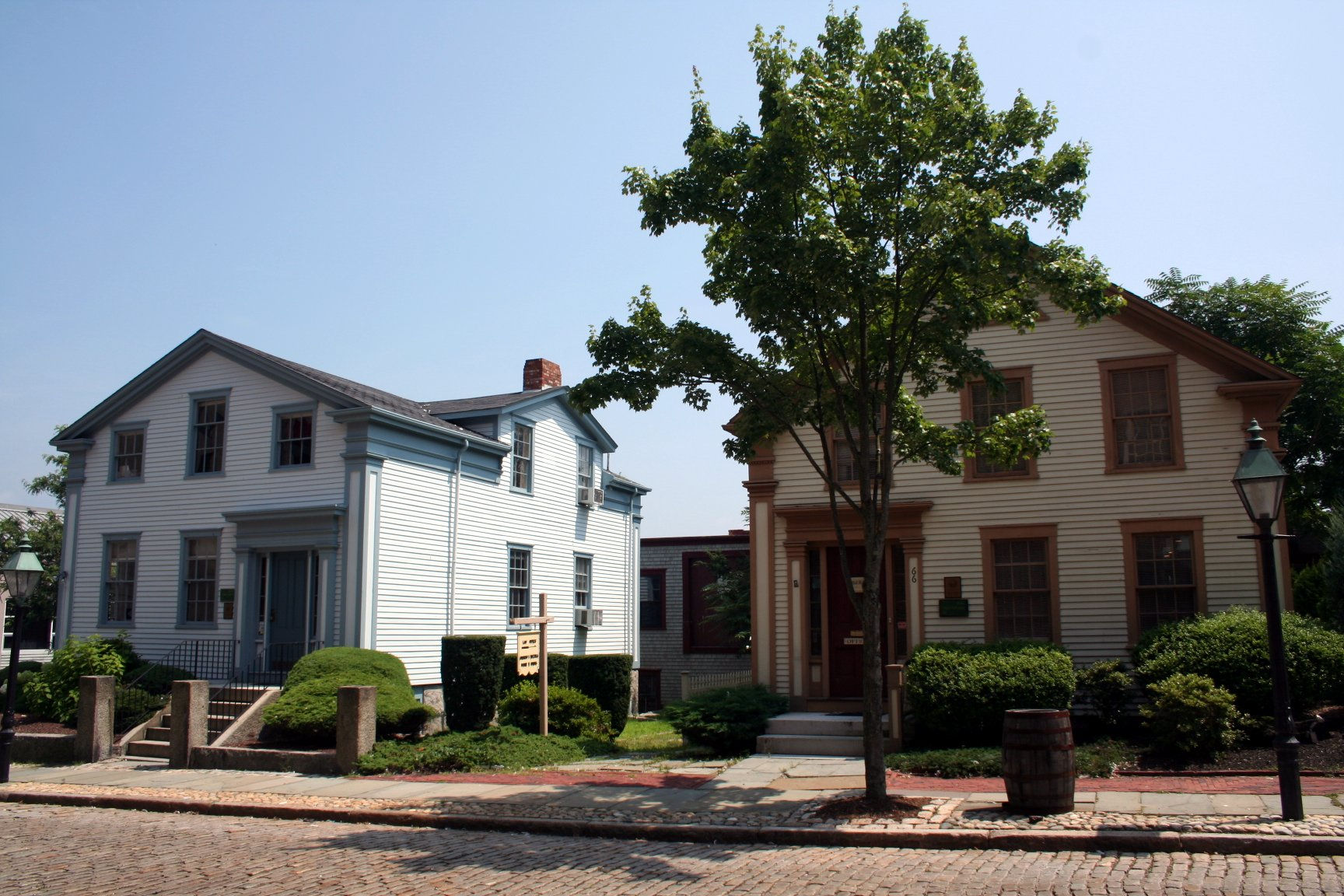
Haile Luther House, 70 North Second St, New Bedford, Massachusetts

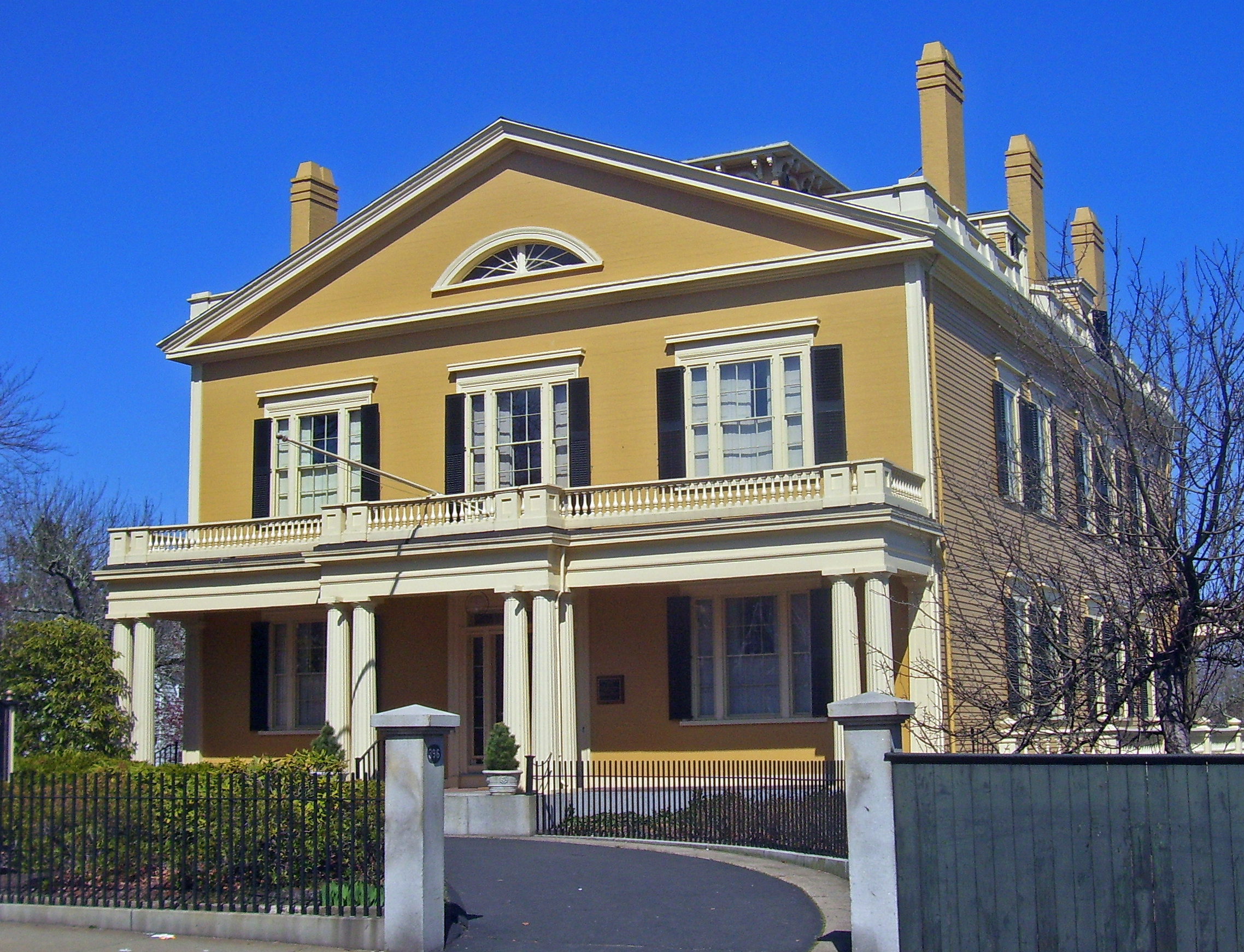
Rotch-Jones-Duff House, 396 County St, New Bedford, MA

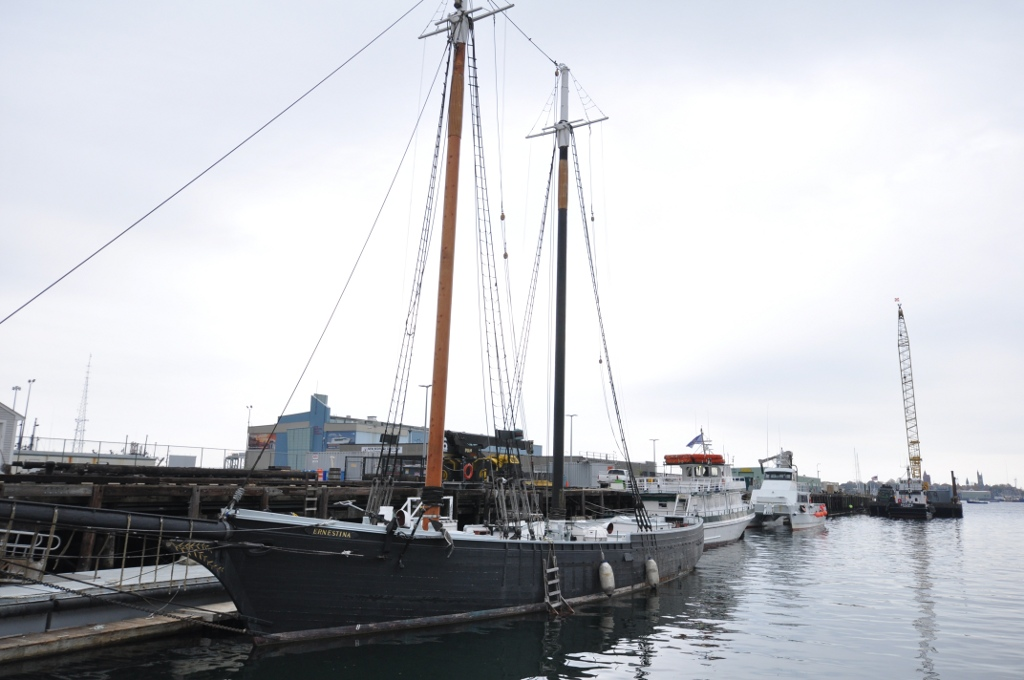
Schooner Ernestina

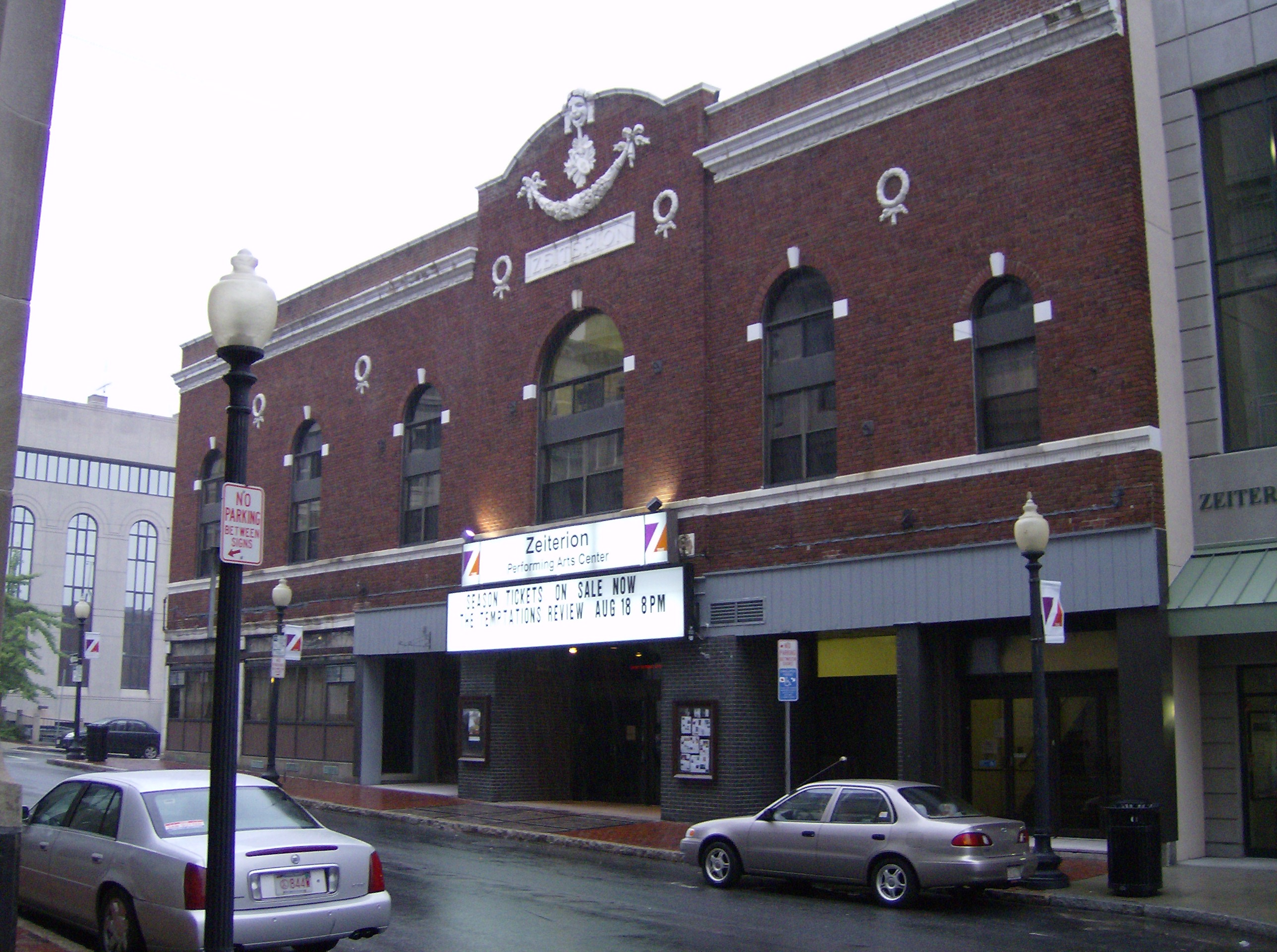
Zeiterion Theater, 684 Purchase St, New Bedford, Massachusetts

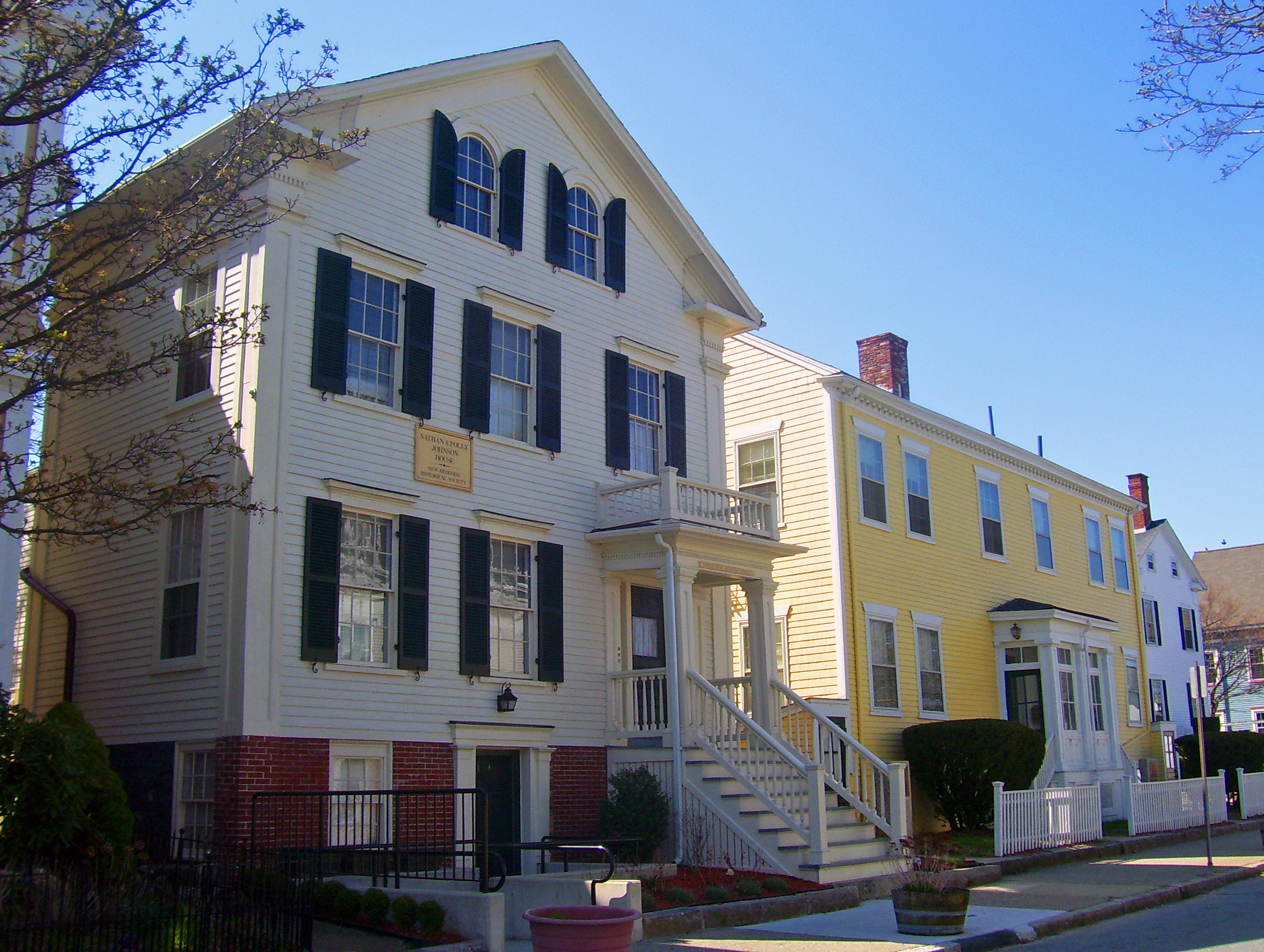
Nathan and Polly Johnson House, 21 Seventh St, New Bedford, Massachusetts

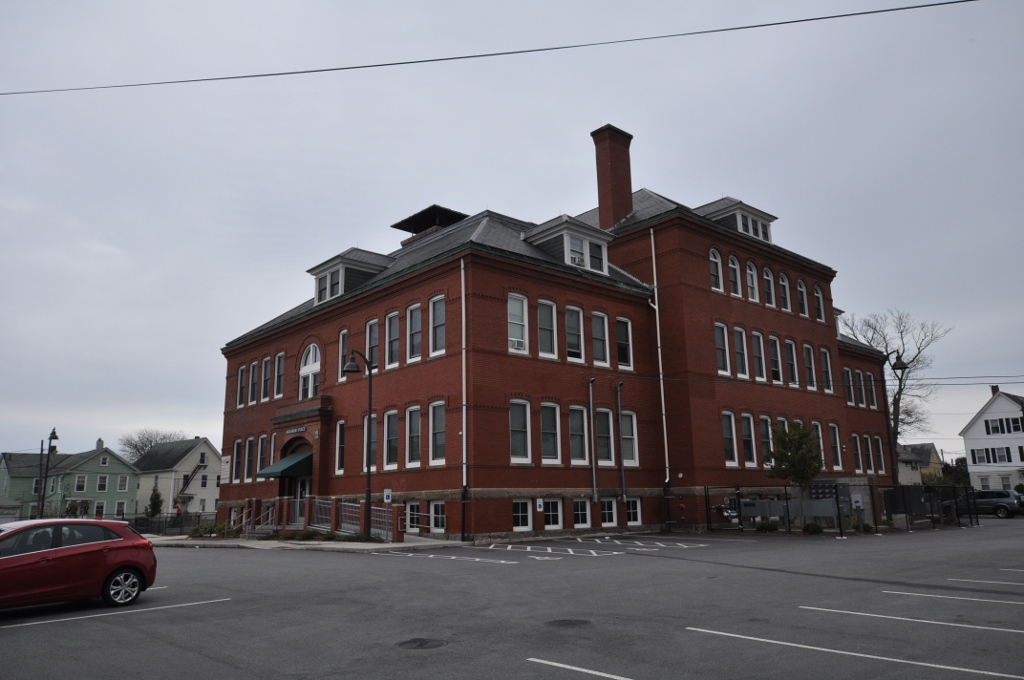
Ingraham School, Rivet St, New Bedford, Massachusetts

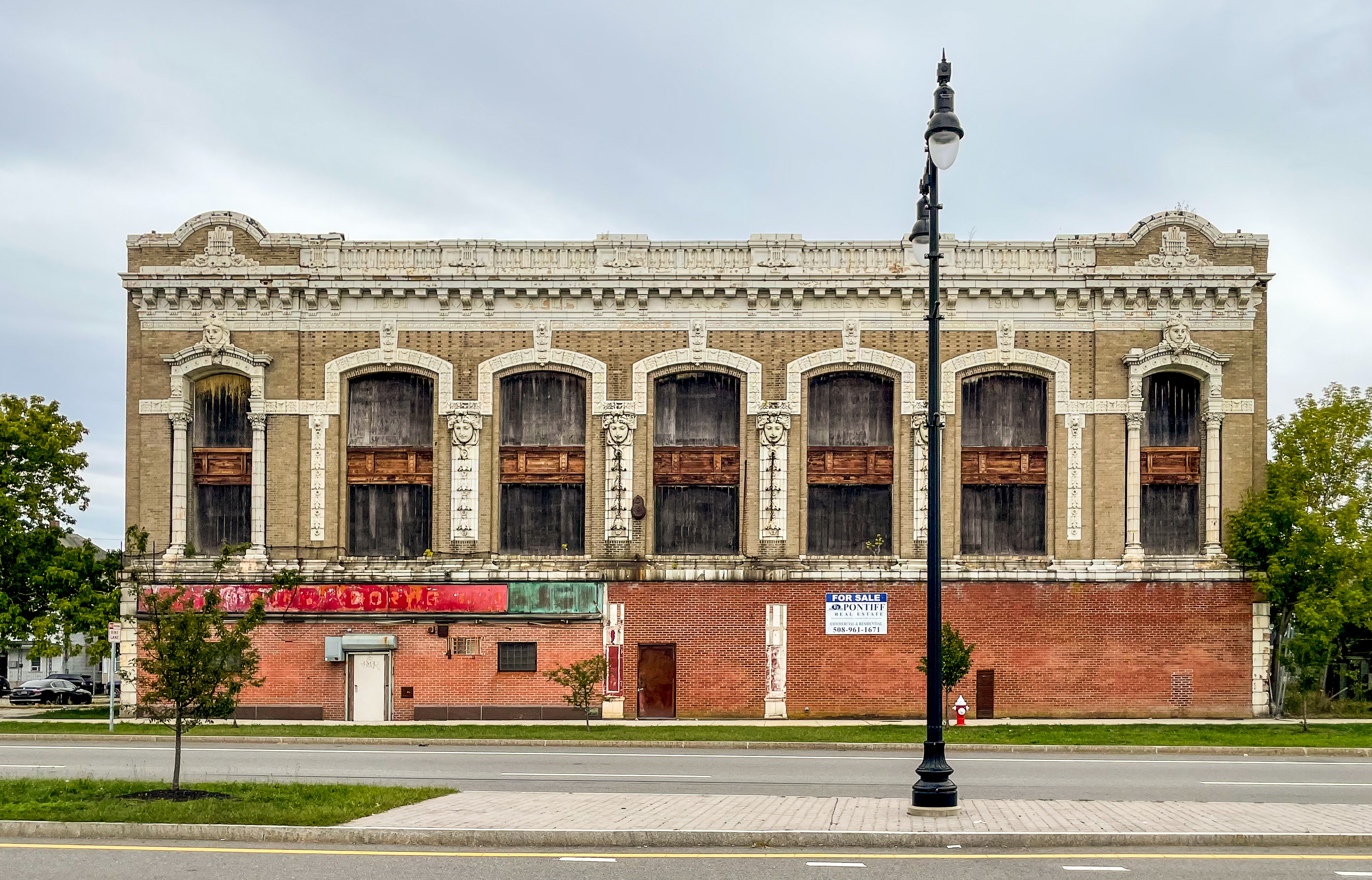
Orpheum Theater, New Bedford, Massachusetts

Since the 1960s, WHALE has completed the following projects:

=== 1960s ===
- Complete Inventory of National Landmark Historic District
- Benjamin Rodman House
- Reynolds Building

=== 1970s ===
- Abijah Hathaway House
- Bedford Landing
- Bourne Warehouse
- Caleb Spooner House
- Eggers Building
- Haile Luther House
- Henry Beetle House
- Macomber-Sylvia Building
- McCullough Warehouse
- Seth Russell House
- Sundial Building
- Rodman Candleworks
- Wilson Stable
- William Tallman Russell House
- William Tallman Warehouse

=== 1980s ===
- Edward Coffin Jones Carriage House
- Hatch Properties
- Rotch-Jones-Duff House and Garden Museum
- Schooner Ernestina
- Zeiterion Theater

=== 1990s ===
- Benjamin Almy House
- Corson Block
- Custom House Square
- Grinnell Congregate Home
- Nathan and Polly Johnson House
- New Bedford Visitor Center
- New Bedford Whaling National Historical Park
- Paul Revere Sign
- Route 18

=== 2000s ===
- 13 Hamilton Street (former WHALE office)
- Elihu Akin House
- National Park Visitors Center (Old Bank Building)
- Corson Building
- Louis Hathaway House
- Union Street Lofts
- Washington Square Gateway Neighborhood Action Plan
- 9 Washington Street
- 350 Purchase Street

=== 2010s ===
- Orpheum Theater
- Fairhaven Historic District
- Ingraham School
- Oscar Romero House
- John Howland Jr. House
- Barker's Lane Block, now the Co-Creative Center
- One Washington Square
- 525 Purchase Street
- 143 Pleasant Street
- Tom Lopes Gateway Park

=== 2020s ===
- 305-307 Pleasant Street
- Leander A. Plummer House
- First Baptist Church, now known as Steeple Playhouse
- Hillman Firehouse

== Current activities ==
Today, WHALE is run by an elected board of directors and hired staff. WHALE staff positions consist of an Executive Director and an Office and Events Manager along with volunteers and occasional consultants. WHALE works closely with other organizations in the area, including the City of New Bedford, New Bedford Historical Commission, the Massachusetts Historical Commission (MHC), the National Park Service and more.
