= First Baptist Church (New Bedford, Massachusetts) =

Historic church in Massachusetts, United States

- U.S. National Register of Historic Places
- U.S. Historic district – Contributing property
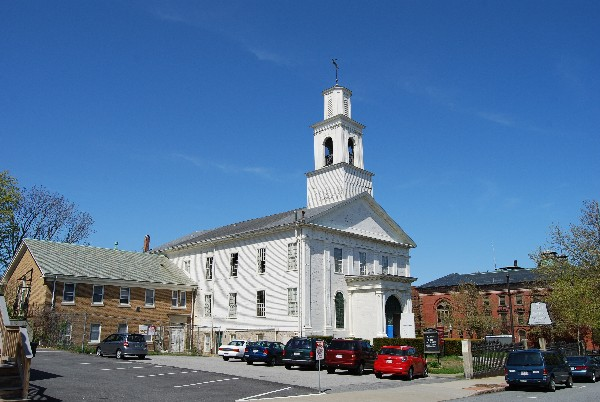

- Location within Massachusetts Location within the United States
- Location: 149 William Street, New Bedford, Massachusetts
- Coordinates: 41°38′6″N 70°55′44″W
- Built: 1829
- Architectural style: Greek Revival
- Part of: County Street Historic District (ID76000229)
- NRHP reference No.: 75000251

Significant dates
- Added to NRHP: April 21, 1975
- Designated CP: August 11, 1976

The First Baptist Church is a historic Baptist church meeting house in New Bedford, Massachusetts. The Greek Revival building was constructed in 1829, and has been a prominent landmark of the city ever since. Its tower appears on the city seal.

The church was listed on the National Register of Historic Places in 1975, and included in the County Street Historic District in 1976. In 2015 the landmark was declared a National Treasure by the National Trust for Historic Preservation.

In 1863 Major Henry M. Robert attended the annual general meeting at the First Baptist Church in New Bedford and on the spot was elected the chairman pro tem of the meeting. He was embarrassed because he knew nothing of how to run a meeting. It was that meeting that caused him to begin studying parliamentary law, which culminated in the publication of the first edition of his book, Robert's Rules of Order, in 1876.

In 2012 the Waterfront Historic Area LeaguE (WHALE), a local historic preservation non-profit, undertook a feasibility study focused on restoring the church for use as a theater venue. That same year, a partnership between theater company Your Theatre and WHALE was formed and an agreement reached with the First Baptist congregation to move their operations into the building’s annex. Over the course of the next decade, WHALE, funded by a combination of grants, state historic tax credit, city funds and direct donations from organizations and individuals, would work to revitalize the building.

In November of 2023 the First Baptist Church's doors reopened as the Steeple Playhouse.

== See also ==
- National Register of Historic Places listings in New Bedford, Massachusetts
