= Hazelwood Park =

Hazelwood Park may refer to:

- Hazelwood Park, South Australia, a suburb of Adelaide
  - Hazelwood Park, Adelaide, a park in the suburb
- Hazelwood Park (New Bedford, Massachusetts)
