= Nathan Johnson (abolitionist) =

African-American abolitionist (c. 1797–1880)

Nathan Johnson (ca. 1797-1880) was an African-American abolitionist who sheltered fugitive slaves, most notably Frederick Douglass, and was a successful businessman in New Bedford, Massachusetts. He married Mary Durfee, nicknamed Polly, who was his business partner in their confectionery and catering businesses. In 1849, Nathan followed the Gold Rush to California. Polly died in 1871 and Nathan returned after her death and was a beneficiary of her estate.

The Nathan and Polly Johnson House is on the city's Underground Railroad Tour and has been recognized as a National Historic Landmark.

== Early life ==
Johnson was born a free person of color or a slave in Philadelphia or Virginia about 1797. His mother was Emely Brown.

He claimed to have purchased his freedom and was described by Daniel Ricketson as a "tall and dignified in person, and dark in complexion, a marked African of the finest type".

== Personal life ==
=== Marriage ===
He married widowed Mary J. Mingo Durfee, called Polly, in New Bedford on October 24, 1819. Born a free Black person in 1784 in Fall River, Massachusetts, her parents were Isaac and Ann Mingo. Before she married Johnson, she was married and had at least one daughter, Rhoda Durfee. The Johnsons settled in New Bedford.

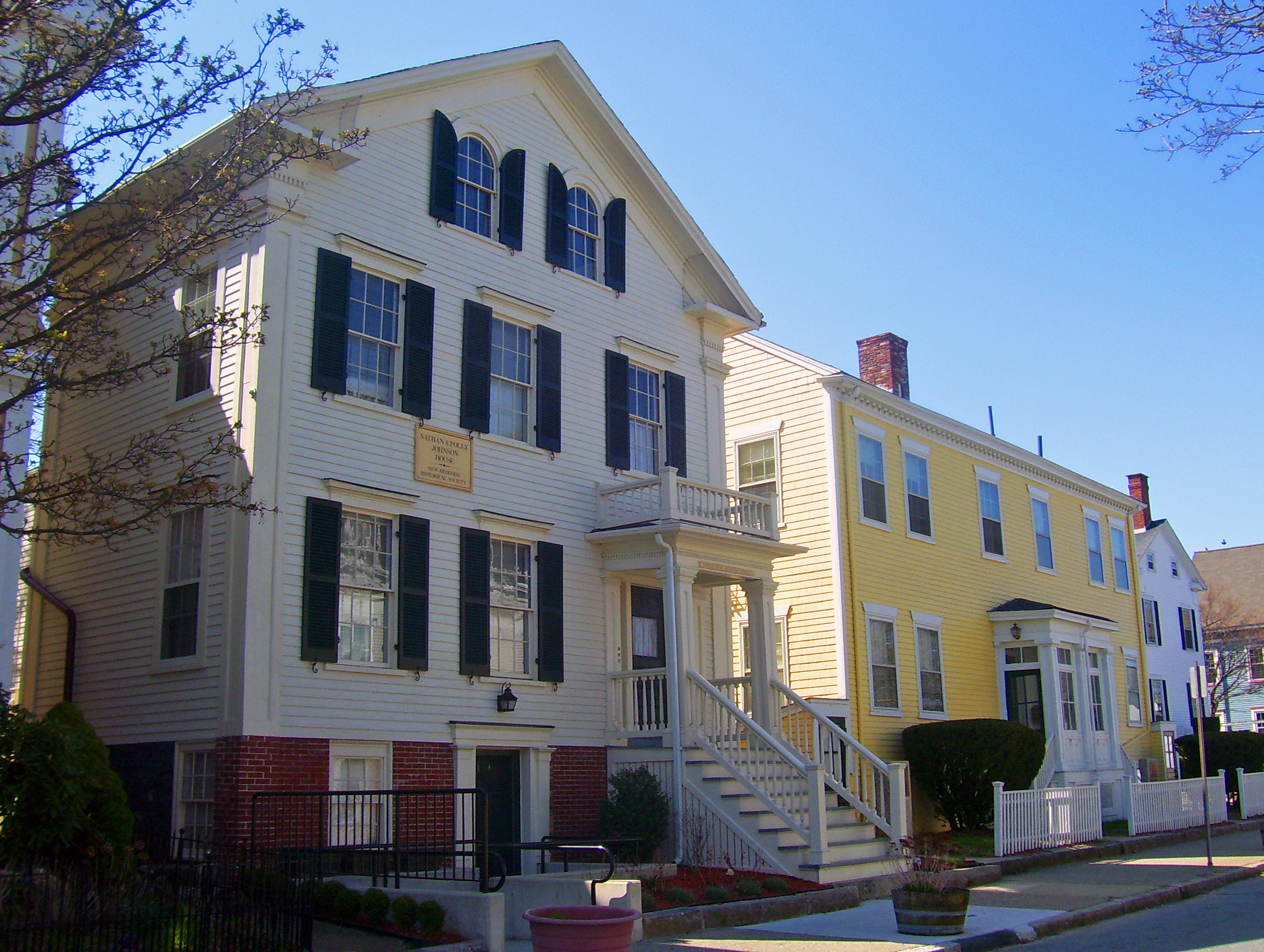
Nathan and Mary (Polly) Johnson properties

In 1826, the Johnsons lived at 21 Seventh Street in New Bedford. By 1845, the Johnsons had enough success in business that they owned the lot including properties on Seventh Street and an adjacent one (then numbered 23 Seventh Street, but no longer standing) which they used as a shop.

=== Abolitionists ===
In the 1820s, they became involved in the abolitionist cause. Polly attended anti-slavery meetings and was well-read about social issues of the time. She was described as "a fair mulatto, always lady-like and pleasant" by Daniel Ricketson of New Bedford, who also remembered seeing her walk arm-in-arm with Maria Weston Chapman following an anti-slavery meeting in Boston, as he walked arm-in-arm with Lucretia Mott.

Nathan was politically active in both organizations of African Americans and those involved in the abolitionist cause. Since New Bedford was a busy port doing business with southern states, it was a regular place of refuge for people escaping slavery, and Johnson is documented to have sheltered fugitives in his properties. On March 28, 1827, Nathan and 24 people went the house of John Howard. They attacked him and broke his windows, after knocking down his door. A trial was held and Johnson and the others were found not guilty after it was learned that the man was in town to gather information about people who escaped from slavery.

In 1832, Nathan represented Massachusetts in Philadelphia at the second annual convention of free people of color. The next year, he was made one of four honorary members. He attended the convention in 1834. At the Massachusetts Anti-Slavery Society convention of 1840, he was made one of five vice presidents. He became president of the National Convention of Colored People in 1847.

[Johnson] has conciliated the respect of the community in which he dwells... by his uniformly upright conduct and modest manners... [and had built up] a very pretty estate, and has found time to attend to the cultivation of his mind.

— Samuel Joseph May, a white abolitionist

=== Assist former slaves ===
The Johnson's properties were a station on the Underground Railroad. In 1834, an enslaved woman, Betsey Gibson, her daughter Jane, and another daughter and half-siblings were brought to New Bedford. They were brought to the home of Nathan Johnson at 21 Seventh Street home, at the request of Patrick Gibson, who enslaved them all. Betsey Gibson, aged 34, was his concubine and Patrick wanted to have her and the children cared for and educated. He paid for their education. Seven-year-old Jane and her sister, eleven-year-old Helen, were Betsey and Patrick's daughters. There was also a boy named Toby and about nine-year-old girl named Margaret, which may have been Patrick's daughter or granddaughter. He ensured that they had food, cloth for clothing, and that they were receiving a good education. He also ensured that they were aware of events in their family member's lives. Patrick, who had come north regularly for his health, died unexpectedly in December 1837. Expenses for the Gibsons was managed by Patrick's business partner, Edmund Molyneux, who said that he wished to relocate the Gibsons to Jamaica, where slavery became illegal in 1838. Johnson was leery about the arrangement, but Betsey felt she should trust that it would all work out. Townspeople from New Bedford, afraid that the Gibson family would be returned to slavery, became involved in investigating their legal status after Patrick Gibson's death and the nature of Nathan's intentions. It was determine that Nathan was not at fault and that the Gibsons should remain in New Bedford. See also Amelia Piper, Jane's mother-in-law, and Elizabeth Piper Ensley, Jane's daughter.

The Johnsons most famously gave shelter in 1838 to Frederick Douglass when he escaped slavery and his wife Anna Murray-Douglass at their house on 21 Seventh Street. When Frederick Douglass came to New Bedford, he had the surname Johnson, and Nathan Johnson suggested that he take the surname of Douglas based upon a figure from Walter Scott's The Lady of the Lake, which Nathan was reading at that time. He may have suggested the spelling of Douglass in recognition of Robert and Grace Douglass, prominent African Americans from Philadelphia. (Note: His mother gave him the name Frederick Augustus Washington Bailey, which he changed to Frederick Johnson when he got to New York. Nathan Johnson suggested the surname Douglass.)

Johnson...lived in a neater house; dined at a better table; took, paid for, and read, more newspapers; better understood the moral, religious, and political character of the nation, —than nine tenths of the slaveholders in Talbot county Maryland.

— Frederick Douglass, Narrative of the Life of Frederick Douglass, an American Slave

== Career ==
=== Domestic servants ===
The couple were in the employ of Charles Waln Morgan, a prominent whaling captain, as domestic servants. Morgan, who had lived in Philadelphia, moved to New Bedford and married Sarah Rodman in June 1819. Polly was employed by the Morgans by late January 1820. Nathan was employed by the Morgans (Note: Morgan may have brought Nathan Johnson to New Bedford.) as was Polly's daughter, Rhoda. The family likely lived on Union Street in the Morgan's house, because they did not have their own residence in 1820. Morgan, identified as a wealthy Quaker family for whom the Johnsons worked as domestic servants, helped the Johnsons buy their properties on Seventh Street.

=== Businessman ===
Polly made cakes and confections that were purchased by wealthy families of New Bedford by 1836. She made cakes, candy, and ice creams for weddings and parties. They also sold superior quality jellies, spices, fruit, nuts, olives, and refreshments. By 1845, the Johnsons operated a confectionery and catering shop on Seventh Street. Polly sold free labor candy, meaning that there were no slaves involved in growth or manufacturing of sugar. The shop, located at 23 Seventh Street, sold candy sticks, ginger snaps, spruce gum, John Brown's Bullets, and Jackson Balls. She is said to have acquired some of her skills as a cook in France. Her clients included the wealthy families of New Bedford, including that of John Avery Parker and her former employer, Charles W. Morgan.

They also had income from real estate investments and a few businesses that Johnson ran in the 1840s. He was the second most wealthy black man of New Bedford in 1849. He owned $18,700 (equivalent to $556,000 in 2024) in real estate and personal property. In the 1850s, they were among the wealthiest African Americans in the city.

=== Gold Rush ===
Nathan followed the Gold Rush to California in 1849, while Polly remained at home and continued her work and provided a safe home to at least one fugitive slave. He had given her power of attorney to manage their affairs in his absence. He was legally declared an insolvent debtor by 1852, perhaps because he carried a heavier mortgage on his property than he could carry.

== Later years and death ==
The Rodman family, who were friends of the Johnsons from the 1820s, took possession of the Johnson's properties on Seventh Street and Polly worked to earn the money to buy them back. She owned it again by 1857, when she added an addition to the house.

Nathan stayed along the Pacific Coast, living in Oregon and Caribou, British Columbia until the early 1870s. Polly died on November 19, 1871. Her will stipulated that Nathan could have "a maintenance" for the rest of his life from her estate if he returned to New Bedford within two years of her death. He returned to the town a poor man. In 1873, he lived at 21 Seventh Street, where he asked for money from Gerrit Smith, an abolitionist, using Frederick Douglass's narrative as a means of introduction for his role in providing shelter to the Douglasses.

Nathan had a stroke in his house and was taken to his daughter, Mrs. Mary Duff's house, where he died on October 11, 1880. Frederick Douglass, who had seen him between 1873 and three weeks before his death, said that Johnson was "in many respects a rare man. I do not remember to have met a man more courageous and less ostentatious, more self-respectful and yet more modest." Polly and Nathan Johnson are buried in the old section of the Oak Grove Cemetery of New Bedford. His gravestone states "Freedom for All Mankind". Other family members include their mothers, Emely Brown and Anna Mingo. Patience Durfee and Thomas P. Buchanan and their daughters, Elizabeth and Mary, were buried at the cemetery.
