= New Bedford Fire Museum =

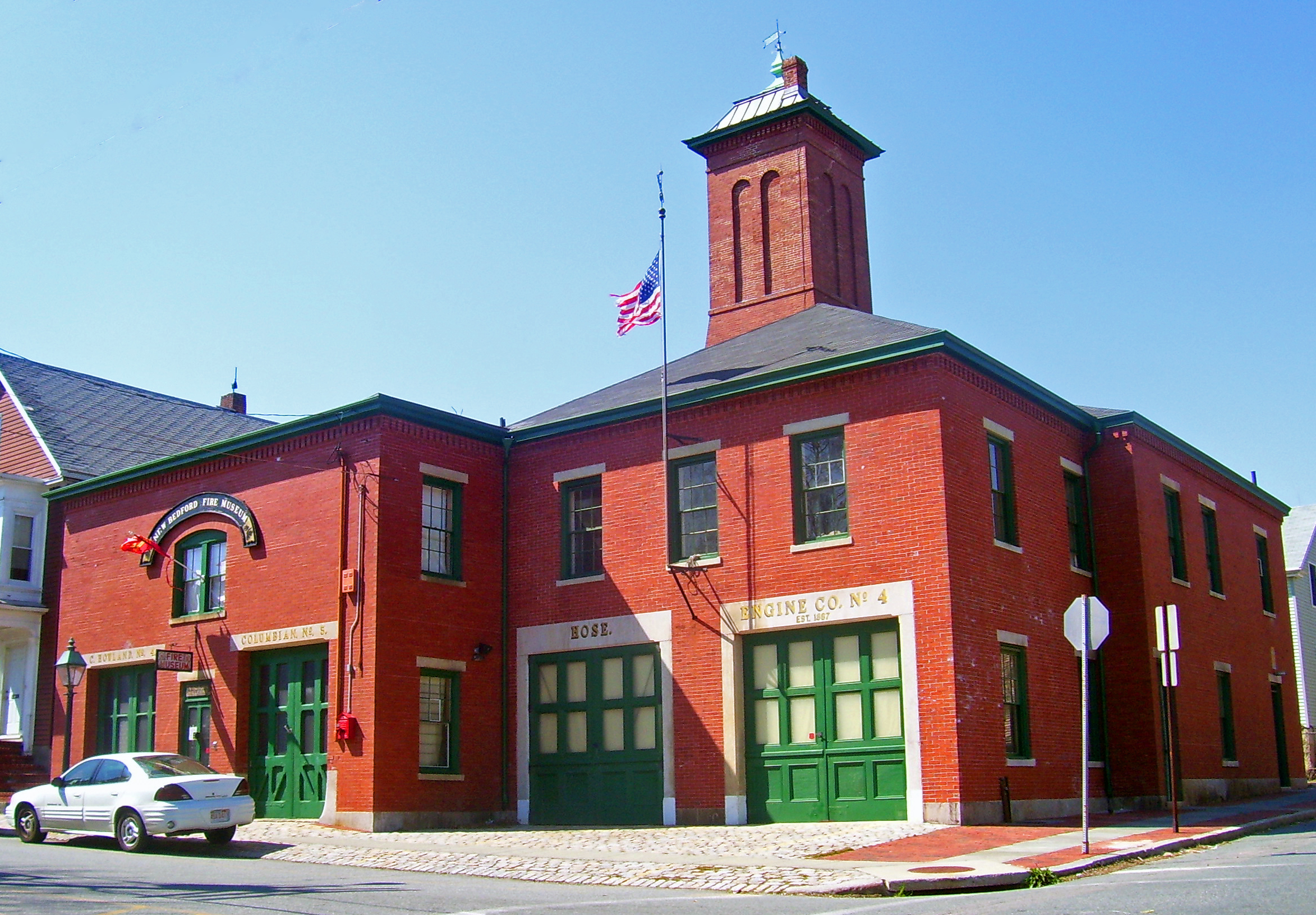
- The New Bedford Fire Museum, formerly Fire Station No. 4
- Established: 1976
- Location: 51 Bedford St., New Bedford, MA, United States
- Type: Firefighting museum
- Website: http://www.newbedford-ma.gov/fire/museum.html
- Fire Station No. 4
- U.S. National Register of Historic Places
- U.S. Historic district – Contributing property
- Location within Massachusetts Location within the United States
- Coordinates: 41°37′41″N 70°55′38″W
- Area: 0.1 acres (0.040 ha)
- Built: 1867
- Architectural style: Italianate
- Part of: County Street Historic District (ID76000229)
- NRHP reference No.: 75000250

Significant dates
- Added to NRHP: July 24, 1975
- Designated CP: August 11, 1976

The New Bedford Fire Museum is a local history museum at 51 Bedford Street in New Bedford, Massachusetts, United States. It is located in the 1867 Fire Station No. 4, the city's oldest surviving fire station. The building was listed on the National Register of Historic Places in 1975. The museum is open between July 4 and Labor Day. It houses a collection of firefighting equipment and memorabilia related to the history of firefighting in the city.

== Architecture and building history ==
The New Bedford Fire Museum is located south of downtown New Bedford, at the northwest corner of South 6th and Bedford Streets. The former fire station it is located in is a two-story brick building, constructed in 1867 and enlarged in the 1880s. Its most prominent feature is the hose tower, which has bricked-over rounded-arch openings and a hip roof with a flared eave and corbelled brick cornice. The original portion of the station has two equipment bays, with paneled doors and granite frame. The enlargement, to the left of the main block, also has two bays on either side of a pedestrian door. The building was originally designed for horse-drawn fire equipment, its lower level including stable space, and the upper level used in part as a hay loft.

The station's first foreman was A.M. Howland Jr., who later served as mayor of New Bedford, and it was staffed by a volunteer force. The station was named in honor of Cornelius Howland, one of the city's leading merchants. The addition originally housed the fire department repair shop. In 1913, the volunteer force was replaced by paid staff, and the hay lofts were converted into living space.

The station was one of the oldest continuously operating fire stations in the state when it was closed in 1979. In 1975 it was added to the National Register of Historic Places as Fire Station No. 4. The museum was opened the following year.

== Museum collection ==
The museum has a collection of old firefighting equipment and some old fire engines. Among them is the original 1867 Cornelius Howland hand pumper, which saw active service in this station until 1884. It also includes log books from the station's operations between 1867 and 1913. Visitors can try on old uniforms and slide down the pole. Old city fire records dating to 1890 are available for research and review. Retired and active city firefighters act as docents.

Rain damage to the station's roof required the closing and renovation of the museum's second story. It reopened in July 2008.

== See also ==
- National Register of Historic Places listings in New Bedford, Massachusetts
