= Hotel Waverly (New Bedford, Massachusetts) =

- U.S. National Register of Historic Places
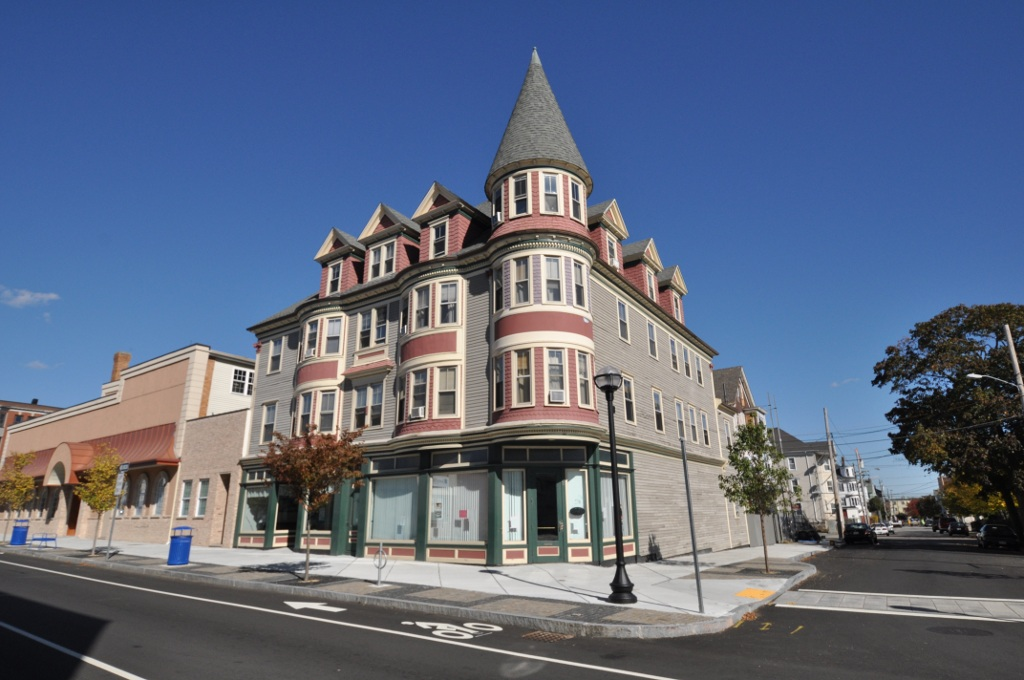

- Location within Massachusetts Location within the United States
- Location: New Bedford, Massachusetts
- Coordinates: 41°39′26″N 70°55′38″W
- Built: 1901
- Architect: Samuel C. Hunt
- Architectural style: Queen Anne
- NRHP reference No.: 89002326
- Added to NRHP: January 26, 1990

The Hotel Waverly is a historic hotel at 1162-1166 Acushnet Avenue in New Bedford, Massachusetts. The 3 1/2-story hotel was designed by locally prominent architect Samuel C. Hunt and built in 1901. The Queen Anne structure was originally designed to house four residential units on the upper floors, and retail space on the ground floor. In 1911, it was repurposed into the Hotel Waverly, with the second floor converted to a cabaret space. It was renamed the Hotel Touraine in 1922, operating as such until the mid-1970s.

The building was added to the National Register of Historic Places in 1990. Completely renovated in 2000, it is now home to low income housing, and known as Talbot Apartments.

== See also ==
- National Register of Historic Places listings in New Bedford, Massachusetts
