= Moreland Terrace Historic District =

Historic district in Massachusetts, United States

- U.S. National Register of Historic Places
- U.S. Historic district
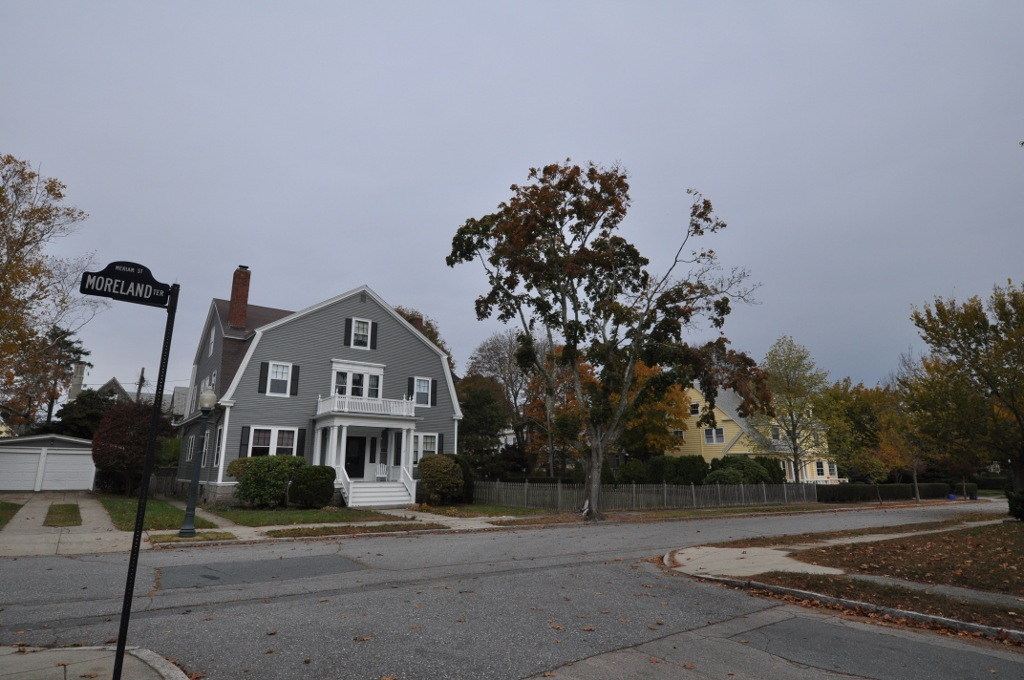
- Houses on Moreland Terrace

- Location within Massachusetts Location within the United States
- Location: New Bedford, Massachusetts
- Coordinates: 41°37′40″N 70°56′11″W
- Area: 18 acres (7.3 ha)
- Built: 1891
- Architect: multiple
- Architectural style: Bungalow/Craftsman, Colonial Revival, Shingle Style
- NRHP reference No.: 96000610
- Added to NRHP: June 3, 1996

The Moreland Terrace Historic District is a historic district roughly bounded by Moreland Terrace, Ash, Bedford, and Page Streets in New Bedford, Massachusetts. It is a residential area that was developed in the early-to-mid 20th century, and is characterized by larger lot sizes and a higher quality of housing than surrounding areas. Most of the houses are Colonial Revival in style, with a few examples of earlier styles (Georgian Revival, Queen Anne), as well as a few later ranch-style houses.

The district was added to the National Register of Historic Places in 1996.

== See also ==
- National Register of Historic Places listings in New Bedford, Massachusetts
