= North Bedford Historic District =

Historic district in Massachusetts, United States

- U.S. National Register of Historic Places
- U.S. Historic district
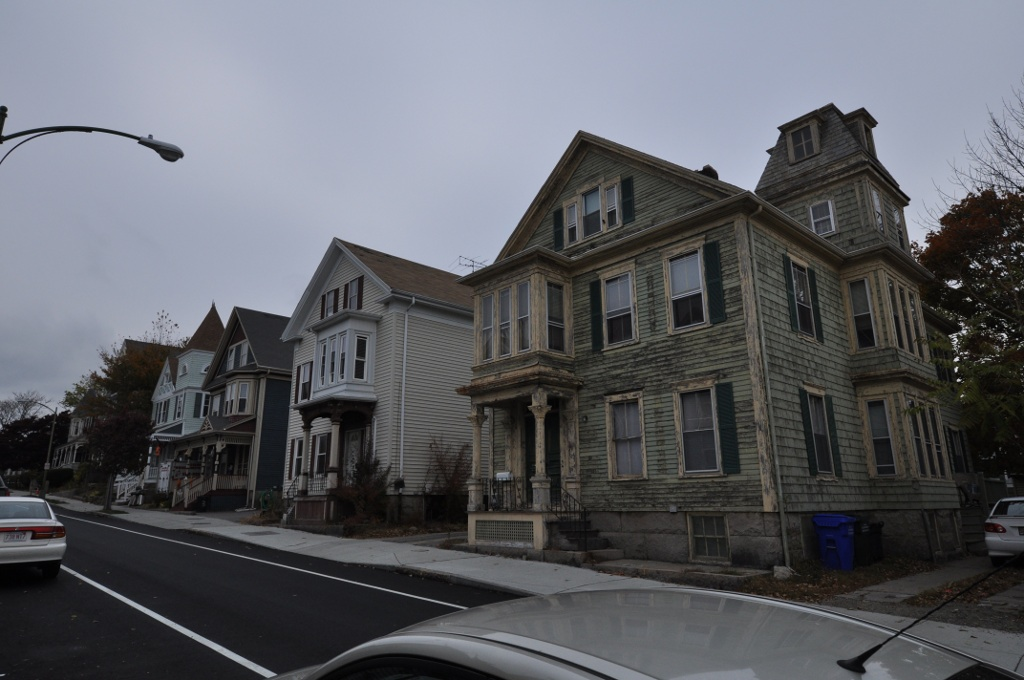
- Houses on Mill Street

- Location within Massachusetts Location within the United States
- Location: New Bedford, Massachusetts
- Coordinates: 41°38′25″N 70°55′49″W
- Area: 60 acres (24 ha)
- NRHP reference No.: 00000899
- Added to NRHP: September 19, 1979

The North Bedford Historic District is a historic district roughly bounded by Summer, Parker, Pleasant and Kempton Streets in New Bedford, Massachusetts. It encompasses a predominantly residential neighborhood north of downtown New Bedford which was developed primarily in the mid-19th century. It features a variety of worker housing of the period, as well as a number of higher quality houses built by businessmen. The district was added to the National Register of Historic Places in 1979.

== Description and history ==
The historic district is located just north of downtown New Bedford, and is roughly bounded by four significant traffic arteries: Kempton Street to the south, County Street to the west, Parker Street to the north, and Purchase Street (running just next to the city's downtown highway connector) to the east. The area is about 60 acres (24 ha) in size, and has 400 primarily residential buildings. Most of these are single-family wood frame residences, many of them in vernacular versions of styles popular between about 1820 and 1860. Italianate features predominate, although earlier Greek Revival and later Second Empire and Queen Anne examples are also numerous. A modest number of houses are more elaborate or stylistically formal; these were typically built for wealthier businessman or merchants. There are two major non-residential properties: the St. Lawrence Church, and a state National Guard armory.

New Bedford was originally part of Dartmouth, and was separately incorporated in 1787. By the early 19th century it was one of Massachusetts's major maritime ports, having surpassed Nantucket as the world's leading whaling port. The North Bedford area developed residentially as the city center and waterfront area developed to serve this business, growing roughly from south to north. The area's growth continued for a time after the whaling industry declined, as the city's waterfront areas were developed in the later 19th century with textile mills. Areas on either side of the district, once also residential in character, were razed as part of urban redevelopment activities in the 1960s.

== See also ==
- National Register of Historic Places listings in New Bedford, Massachusetts
