= National Register of Historic Places listings in New Bedford, Massachusetts =

List of Registered Historic Places in New Bedford, Massachusetts.

Contents: Counties in Massachusetts

Barnstable | Berkshire | Bristol | Dukes | Essex | Franklin | Hampden | Hampshire | Middlesex | Nantucket | Norfolk | Plymouth | Suffolk | Worcester

This National Park Service list is complete through NPS recent listings posted March 27, 2026.

| | Name on the Register | Image | Date listed | Location | Description |
|---|---|---|---|---|---|
| 1 | Acushnet Heights Historic District | Acushnet Heights Historic District | December 1, 1989 (#89002035) | Roughly bounded by Summer, Weld, Purchase, Pope, County, and Robeson; 41°38′52″N 70°55′53″W | |
| 2 | Butler Flats Light | Butler Flats Light | June 15, 1987 (#87001530) | New Bedford Channel; 41°36′07″N 70°53′54″W | |
| 3 | Buttonwood Park Historic District | Buttonwood Park Historic District | August 24, 2000 (#00000915) | Kempton St., Rockdale Ave., Hawthorne St., and Brownell Ave. 41°37′55″N 70°57′07″W | |
| 4 | Sgt. William H. Carney House | Sgt. William H. Carney House | April 21, 1975 (#75000243) | 128 Mill St. 41°38′15″N 70°55′59″W | |
| 5 | Central New Bedford Historic District | Central New Bedford Historic District | April 24, 1980 (#80000430) | Roughly bounded by Acushnet Ave. and School, Middle, and 6th Sts. 41°38′06″N 70°55′39″W | |
| 6 | County Street Historic District | County Street Historic District | August 11, 1976 (#76000229) | Roughly bounded by Acushnet, Page, Middle, and Bedford Sts. (both sides); 41°37′55″N 70°55′55″W | |
| 7 | Dawson Building | Dawson Building | September 30, 1982 (#82001900) | 1851 Purchase St. 41°39′N 70°56′W | |
| 8 | Thomas Donaghy School | Thomas Donaghy School | March 2, 1989 (#89000041) | 68 South St. 41°37′33″N 70°55′25″W | |
| 9 | ERNESTINA (schooner) | ERNESTINA (schooner) | January 3, 1985 (#85000022) | Steamship Wharf; 41°38′01″N 70°55′16″W | |
| 10 | Fire Station No. 4 | Fire Station No. 4 | July 24, 1975 (#75000250) | 79 S. 6th St. 41°37′41″N 70°55′38″W | 1867 building was oldest fire station in state when closed; now home of New Bedford Fire Museum |
| 11 | First Baptist Church | First Baptist Church | April 21, 1975 (#75000251) | 149 William St. 41°38′06″N 70°55′44″W | |
| 12 | Fort Taber District | Fort Taber District | February 8, 1973 (#73001954) | Wharf Rd. within Fort Rodman Military Reservation; 41°35′36″N 70°54′14″W | |
| 13 | Griffin Street Cemetery | Griffin Street Cemetery | March 19, 2014 (#14000062) | S. 2nd & Griffin Sts. 41°37′42″N 70°55′22″W | |
| 14 | Hazelwood Park | Hazelwood Park | June 24, 2010 (#10000389) | 597-603 Brock Ave. 41°36′24″N 70°54′48″W | |
| 15 | Head of the River Historic District | Head of the River Historic District | December 2, 2009 (#09000965) | 2-28 Mill Rd., 2-13 Tarkiln Hill Rd. 41°40′54″N 70°55′09″W | Extends into Acushnet. |
| 16 | Hotel Waverly | Hotel Waverly | January 26, 1990 (#89002326) | 1162-1166 Acushnet Ave. 41°39′26″N 70°55′38″W | |
| 17 | Howland Mill Village Historic District | Howland Mill Village Historic District | May 30, 1996 (#96000609) | Roughly bounded by Bolton, Winsper, Hemlock Sts., and Rockdale Ave. 41°36′58″N 70°56′00″W | |
| 18 | Robert C. Ingraham School | Robert C. Ingraham School | March 2, 2010 (#10000056) | 80 Rivet St. 41°37′14″N 70°55′20″W | |
| 19 | Jewish Cemetery | Jewish Cemetery | April 15, 2014 (#14000155) | Old Plainville Road; 41°40′51″N 70°58′01″W | |
| 20 | Nathan and Mary Johnson Properties | Nathan and Mary Johnson Properties | February 16, 2000 (#00000260) | 17-19 and 21 7th Street; 41°37′59″N 70°55′44″W | National Historic Landmark; home and meetinghouse of African-American abolitionist couple who took in Frederick Douglass after he escaped from slavery |
| 21 | Lightship No. 114 | Lightship No. 114 | May 30, 1990 (#90000777) | formerly State Pier; 41°38′08″N 70°55′16″W | Scrapped. |
| 22 | Manomet Mills | Manomet Mills | May 24, 2012 (#12000304) | 194-194R, 200 Riverside Ave. 41°40′03″N 70°55′12″W | |
| 23 | Merrill's Wharf Historic District | Merrill's Wharf Historic District | November 11, 1977 (#77000167) | MacArthur Dr. 41°37′59″N 70°55′15″W | Encompasses Steamship Pier and adjacent Coal Pocket Pier. |
| 24 | Moreland Terrace Historic District | Moreland Terrace Historic District | June 3, 1996 (#96000610) | Roughly bounded by Moreland Terrace, Ash, Bedford, and Page Sts. 41°37′40″N 70°56′11″W | |
| 25 | New Bedford Gas and Edison Light Complex | New Bedford Gas and Edison Light Complex | June 3, 2002 (#02000633) | 180 MacAuthur Dr. 41°37′49″N 70°55′16″W | |
| 26 | New Bedford Historic District | New Bedford Historic District | November 13, 1966 (#66000773) | Bounded by Front St. on the east, Elm St. on the north, Acushnet Ave. on the west, and Commercial St. on the south 41°38′07″N 70°55′27″W | National Historic Landmark |
| 27 | New Bedford Whaling National Historical Park | New Bedford Whaling National Historical Park | November 12, 1996 (#03000283) | 33 William St. 41°38′08″N 70°55′27″W | |
| 28 | North Bedford Historic District | North Bedford Historic District | September 19, 1979 (#00000899) | Roughly bounded by Summer, Park, Pleasant, and Kempton Sts. 41°38′25″N 70°55′49″W | |
| 29 | Oak Grove Cemetery | Oak Grove Cemetery | April 28, 2014 (#14000176) | Parker St. 41°38′37″N 70°56′32″W | |
| 30 | Old Third District Courthouse | Old Third District Courthouse | September 28, 1971 (#71000083) | 2nd and William Sts. 41°38′09″N 70°55′29″W | |
| 31 | Palmer Island Light Station | Palmer Island Light Station | March 26, 1980 (#80000433) | New Bedford Harbor; 41°37′34″N 70°54′35″W | ARLHS USA-578 |
| 32 | William J. Rotch Gothic Cottage | William J. Rotch Gothic Cottage | February 17, 2006 (#06000236) | 19 Irving St. 41°37′50″N 70°55′55″W | |
| 33 | William Rotch Jr. House | William Rotch Jr. House | April 5, 2005 (#05000456) | 396 County Street; 41°37′49″N 70°55′43″W | Early Richard Upjohn house for prominent whaling family |
| 34 | Rural Cemetery and Friends Cemetery | Rural Cemetery and Friends Cemetery | April 28, 2014 (#14000177) | 149 Dartmouth St. 41°37′22″N 70°56′07″W | |
| 35 | Bradford Smith Building | Bradford Smith Building | May 17, 1984 (#84002216) | 1927-1941 Purchase St. 41°39′04″N 70°55′49″W | Demolished. |
| 36 | Thompson Street School | Thompson Street School | January 26, 1990 (#89002329) | 58 Crapo St. 41°37′17″N 70°55′37″W | |
| 37 | Times and Olympia Buildings | Times and Olympia Buildings | July 7, 1983 (#83000725) | 908-912 and 880-898 Purchase St. 41°38′11″N 70°55′36″W | |
| 38 | U.S. Customhouse | U.S. Customhouse | December 30, 1970 (#70000735) | Southwestern corner of 2nd and Williams Sts. 41°38′07″N 70°55′29″W | Oldest U.S. Customs facility in continuous use; Greek Revival public building by Robert Mills |
| 39 | Union Baptist Church | Union Baptist Church | June 16, 2008 (#08000532) | 109 Court St. 41°38′03″N 70°56′05″W | |
| 40 | Union Street Railway Carbarn, Repair Shop | Union Street Railway Carbarn, Repair Shop | October 2, 1978 (#78000431) | 1959 Purchase St. 41°39′07″N 70°55′52″W | |
| 41 | Wamsutta Mills | Wamsutta Mills | August 19, 2008 (#08000794) | Acushnet Ave., Logan, Wamsutta, and N. Front St. 41°39′05″N 70°55′39″W | |
| 42 | Whitman Mills | Whitman Mills | August 29, 2003 (#03000844) | 1, 90, and the eastern side of Riverside Ave., rear 1 and the southern and northern sides of Coffin Ave., and 10 Manomet St. 41°39′45″N 70°55′10″W | |

== Former listings ==
| | Name on the Register | Image | Date listed | Date removed | Location | Description |
|---|---|---|---|---|---|---|
| 1 | Rotch Counting House | | September 28, 1971 (#71001103) | September 25, 1972 | 123 Front St. | Demolished for construction of the JFK Memorial Parkway in downtown New Bedford. |
| 2 | Shawmut Diner | Shawmut Diner | November 28, 2003 (#03001208) | December 26, 2023 | 943 Shawmut Ave. 41°39′32″N 70°56′51″W | |

== See also ==
- List of National Historic Landmarks in Massachusetts
