= Head of the River Historic District =

Historic district in Massachusetts, United States

- U.S. National Register of Historic Places
- U.S. Historic district
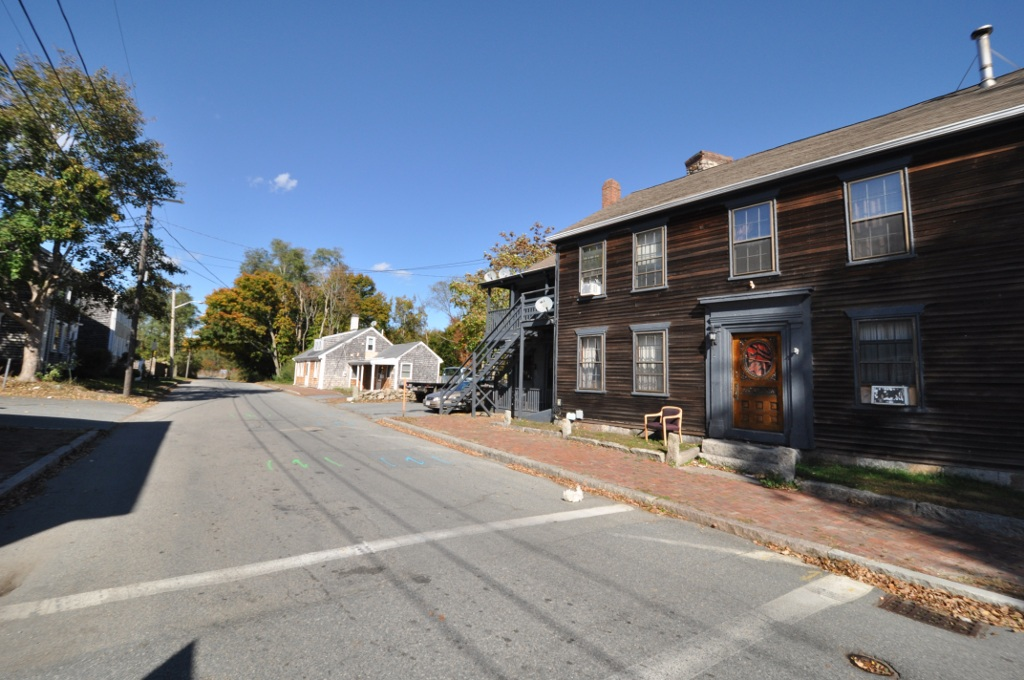
- Houses on the New Bedford side of the river

- Location within Massachusetts Location within the United States
- Location: Acushnet and New Bedford, Massachusetts
- Coordinates: 41°40′54″N 70°55′9″W
- Area: 16.5 acres (6.7 ha)
- NRHP reference No.: 09000965
- Added to NRHP: December 2, 2009

The Head of the River Historic District is a historic district encompassing a village area at the head of navigation of the Acushnet River, which separates Acushnet and New Bedford, Massachusetts. The village is centered at the junction of Tarkiln Hill Road, River Road, and Mill Road in New Bedford, and Main Street in Acushnet. The area went through two significant periods of development: the first was in the late 18th and early 19th century, and the second was in the early 20th century. The district was listed on the National Register of Historic Places in 2009.

== Description and history ==
The Head of the River Historic District is centered on the Acushnet River's head of navigation, a short way north of its mouth into New Bedford Harbor. The river is spanned by a bridge whose oldest portion is a stone-arch span that predates 1850, and was widened with steel spans in 1959. The bridge carries Main Street in Acushnet on the east side, and becomes Tarkiln Hill Road on the west side. The border between Acushnet and New Bedford comes up the river from the south, follows the bridge west, and then runs north on Mill Road, just west of the river. The oldest buildings of the district are clustered close to the bridge, while later development extends eastward along Main Street in Acushnet. The district contains only a few buildings in New Bedford on Tarkiln Hill Road and Mill Road, with most of the remaining properties in Acushnet fronting those roads and Main Street.

Head of the River was one of the principal points of early development by colonial settlers in what is now Acushnet, and saw its first significant period of growth after the American Revolutionary War. Acushnet was originally part of Dartmouth, then New Bedford and Fairhaven, before incorporating in 1860. The oldest surviving buildings in Head of the River date to the 1780s, including the 1-1/2 story Swift House (10 Mill Road) and the Dillingham House (19 Main Street) as examples of this early period. The building at 17 Tarkiln Hill Road, built c. 1800, is a rare commercial building from this period. The finest house from the period is the c. 1817 Hawes House at 17 Main Street. There are also several Greek Revival houses, but development languished in the area until the 20th century, when the Queen Anne house at 28 Main Street was built (c. 1900), along with a number of Craftsman and Dutch Colonial houses between then and about 1935.

== See also ==
- National Register of Historic Places listings in New Bedford, Massachusetts
- National Register of Historic Places listings in Bristol County, Massachusetts
