= William J. Rotch Gothic Cottage =

Historic house in Massachusetts, United States

Coordinates: 41°37′50.33″N 70°55′57.30″W

- U.S. National Register of Historic Places
- U.S. National Historic Landmark
- U.S. Historic district – Contributing property
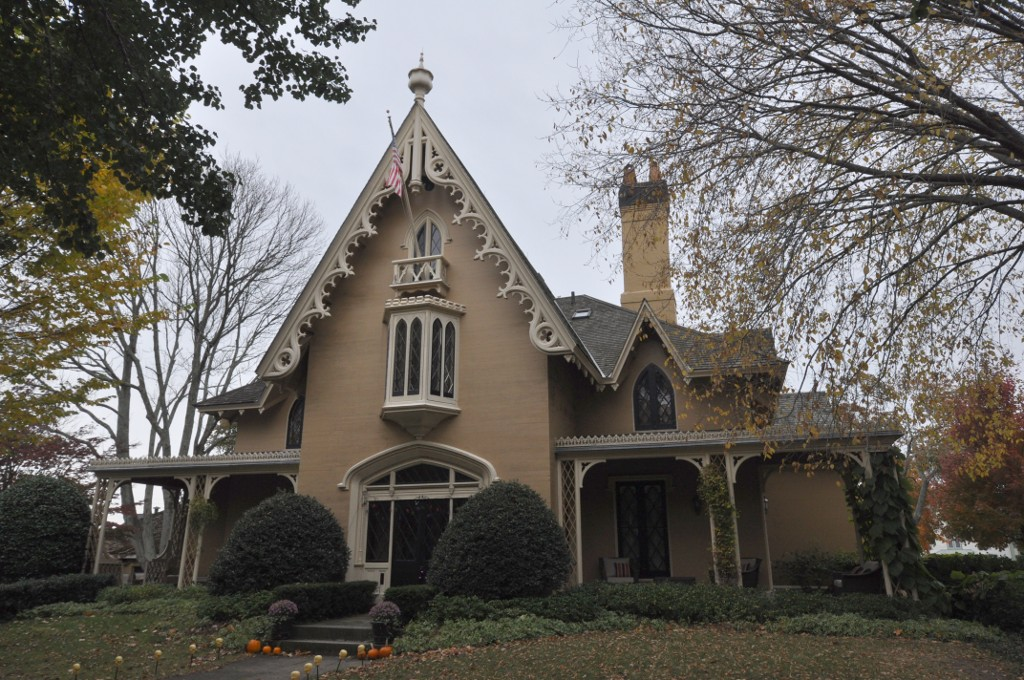

- Location within Massachusetts Location within the United States
- Location: New Bedford, Massachusetts
- Built: 1845
- Part of: County Street Historic District (ID76000229)
- NRHP reference No.: 06000236

Significant dates
- Added to NRHP: February 17, 2006
- Designated CP: August 11, 1976

The William J. Rotch Gothic Cottage is a historic cottage on 19 Irving Street in New Bedford, Massachusetts. The Gothic Revival cottage was built in 1845 to a design by noted New York City architect Alexander Jackson Davis. It was built for William J. Rotch, a member of one of New Bedford's leading whaling families. It is for these two associations that it was designated a National Historic Landmark in 2006. It is one a very few surviving Gothic cottage designs by Davis, exhibiting features not found in the others that do. The house was included in The Architecture of Country Houses, published in 1850, bringing it early fame and making it an iconic example of the style.

The Rotch family was a major force in the development of whaling in the United States and in the rise of New Bedford as a major whaling center. William Rotch, Jr., grandfather of William J. Rotch, established the family's fortunes in the industry beginning in the late 18th century. The land on which the cottage sits was on a rural part of the family's New Bedford estate, and the house and land were a gift to William J. Rotch from his grandfather. The younger Rotch retained Davis to design the house.

The cottage is roughly L-shaped, with a main block that has a hip roof meeting a slightly taller section with a steeply pitched gable end. The exterior is clad with flushboarding, and its roof is composed of wood shingles. The building no longer stands at its original location, having been moved a short distance on its original lot in 1908. The original parcel it sat on has long been subdivided and built up with housing, depriving the house of its rural character. The projecting taller section frames the main entrance, and has elaborate hand-carved vergeboard decoration. On either side of this projecting section are a pair of gabled dormers with Gothic windows; these are a later addition by the Rotches to improve the lighting of upstairs bedrooms. The interiors feature elegant yet fairly typical Gothic Revival styling.

The house was declared a National Historic Landmark and listed on the National Register of Historic Places in 2006.

== See also ==
- National Register of Historic Places listings in New Bedford, Massachusetts
