= Griffin Street Cemetery =

Historic cemetery in Massachusetts, United States

- U.S. National Register of Historic Places
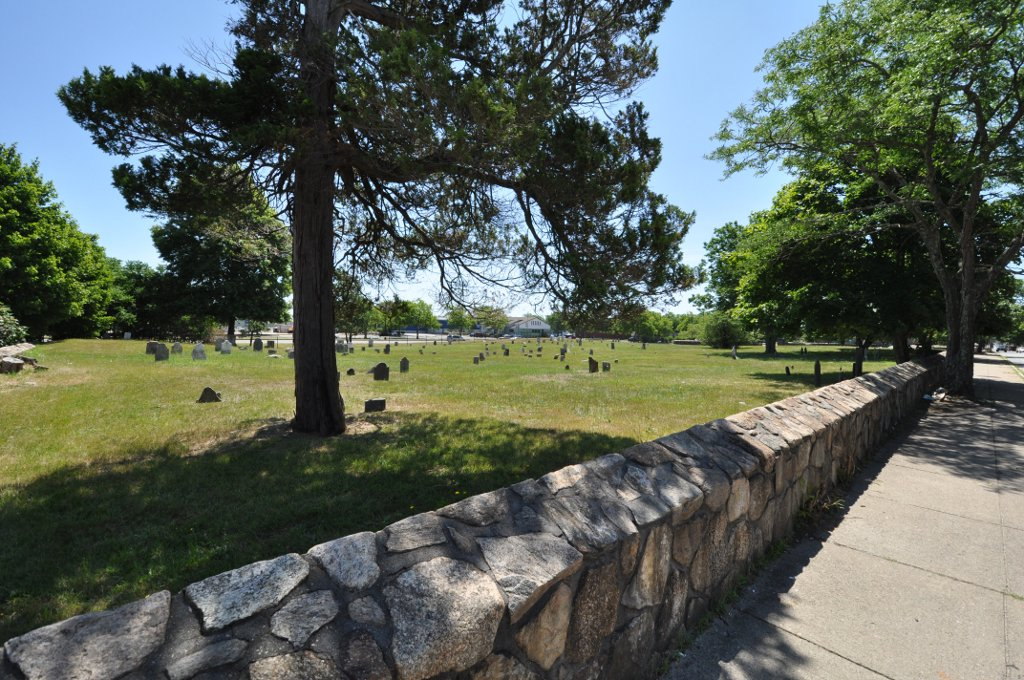

- Location within Massachusetts Location within the United States
- Location: S 2nd and Griffin Sts., New Bedford, Massachusetts
- Coordinates: 41.628323°N 70.922738°W
- Area: 1.69 acres (0.68 ha)
- Built: 1804
- NRHP reference No.: 14000062
- Added to NRHP: March 19, 2014

The Griffin Street Cemetery is a historic cemetery in New Bedford, Massachusetts. Located at the junction of South 2nd and Griffin Streets, and abutting the JFK Memorial Highway to the east, it is the city's oldest surviving cemetery. The plot of the cemetery is about 1.7 acres (0.69 ha) in size, and roughly follows the rectilinear grid of the city streets. It was established in 1804, not far from a Quaker cemetery whose remains were later reinterred in the city's Rural Cemetery. The cemetery has about 230 grave stones, but a significant number of graves are unmarked. The oldest grave dates to 1804, the newest to 1855.

The cemetery was listed on the National Register of Historic Places in 2014.

== See also ==
- National Register of Historic Places listings in New Bedford, Massachusetts
