= Thompson Street School =

- U.S. National Register of Historic Places
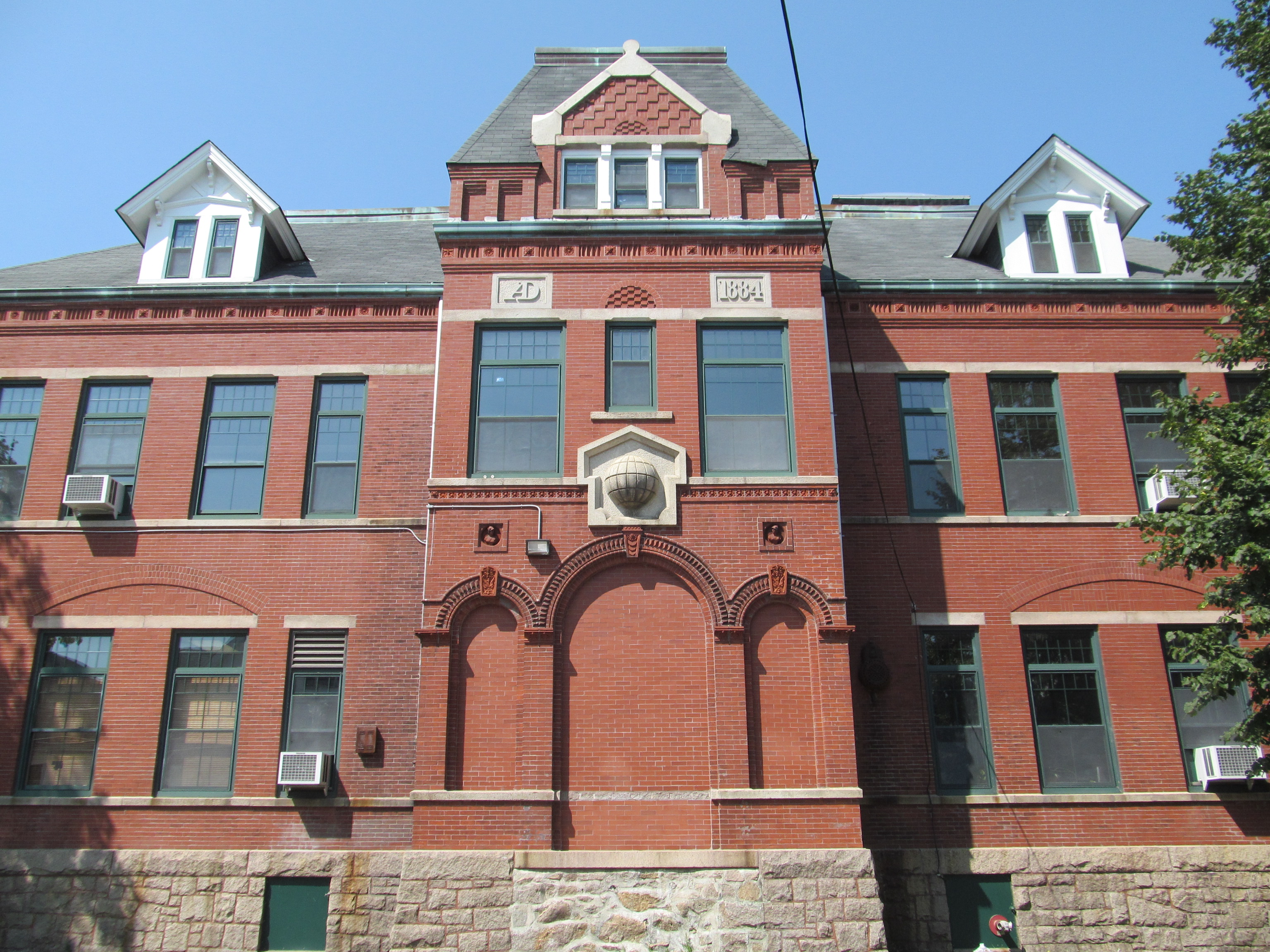
- Thompson Street School

- Location within Massachusetts Location within the United States
- Location: New Bedford, Massachusetts
- Coordinates: 41°37′17″N 70°55′37″W
- Built: 1884
- Architect: Brownell & Murkland
- Architectural style: Late Victorian
- NRHP reference No.: 89002329
- Added to NRHP: January 26, 1990

The Thompson Street School is a historic school building at 58 Crapo Street in New Bedford, Massachusetts. The 2 1/2-story school was built in 1884 to a design by Brownell & Murkland, and features a distinctive blend of Queen Anne, Stick, and Romanesque styling. It was built during a period of rapid growth in the area, and was named for James D. Thompson, a prominent locally-born military leader and politician. It was converted for use as a community center in 1976.

The building was listed on the National Register of Historic Places in 1990.

== See also ==
- National Register of Historic Places listings in New Bedford, Massachusetts
