= New Bedford Gas and Edison Light Complex =

- U.S. National Register of Historic Places
- U.S. Historic district
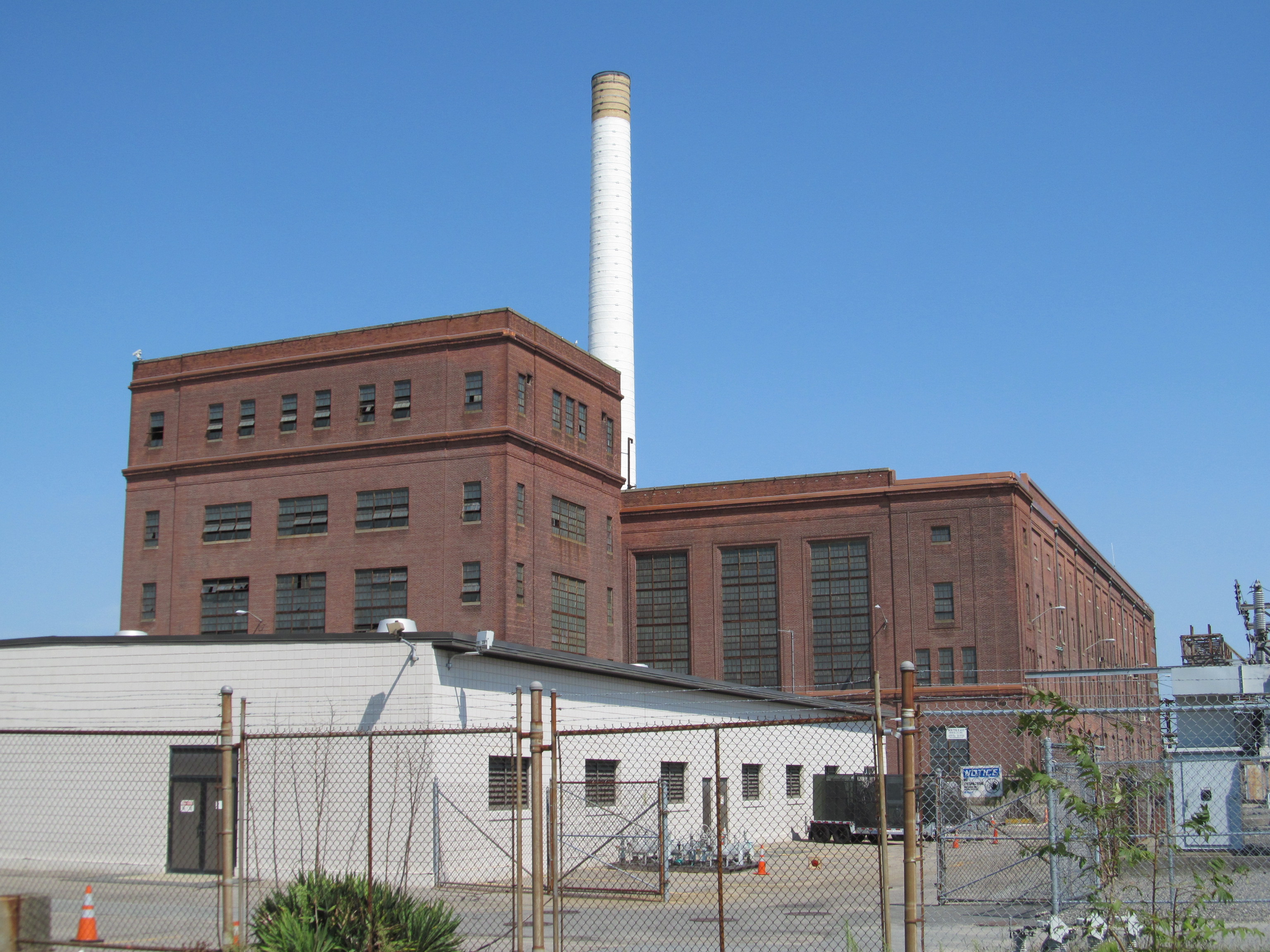
- New Bedford Gas and Edison Light Complex

- Location within Massachusetts Location within the United States
- Location: New Bedford, Massachusetts
- Coordinates: 41°37′49″N 70°55′16″W
- Area: 5.8 acres (2.3 ha)
- Built: 1856
- Architect: Stone and Webster; Durfee, William and Sons
- Architectural style: Classical Revival, Moderne
- NRHP reference No.: 02000633
- Added to NRHP: June 3, 2002

The New Bedford Gas and Edison Light Complex is a historic district at 180 MacArthur Drive in New Bedford, Massachusetts. It consists of two buildings: a power generation facility that served the New Bedford area for most of the 20th century, and a historic 19th century iron foundry building. Both are on a property once owned by NSTAR, the local electric utility, on the New Bedford waterfront. The foundry building is a utilitarian three story structure built out of granite, which was built in 1856 for the Taber & Grinnell Iron Foundry. The Cannon Power Station, in contrast, is a looming presence on the waterfront, about 390 feet (120 m) long and more than 80 feet (24 m) in height. Its initial construction was in 1916, and it was repeatedly enlarged until 1950. It was built by the New Bedford Gas & Electric Light District, and generated power for the city until 1992. In 2002, it was under consideration for use as an aquarium; and at one time a casino but these plans failed. The complex was vacant in 2012.

The power generation building was demolished in early 2023, to make way for a launch point for off-shore wind turbines.

The complex was listed on the National Register of Historic Places in 2002.

== See also ==
- National Register of Historic Places listings in New Bedford, Massachusetts
