= Shawmut Diner =

- Formerly listed on the U.S. National Register of Historic Places
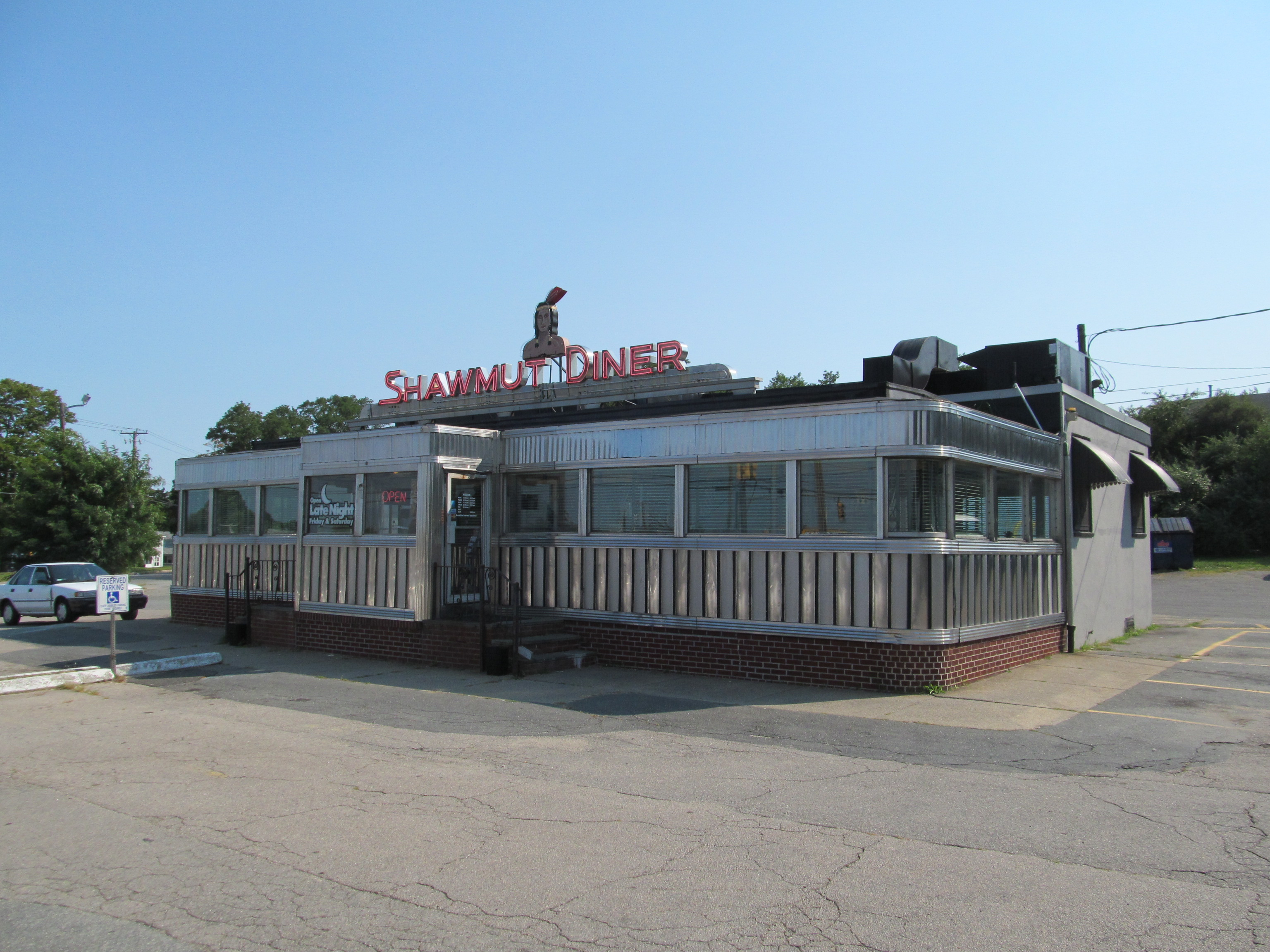
- Shawmut Diner

- Location within Massachusetts Location within the United States
- Location: New Bedford, Massachusetts
- Coordinates: 41°39′32″N 70°56′51″W
- Built: 1953
- Architect: Jerry O'Mahony, Inc.
- MPS: Diners of Massachusetts MPS
- NRHP reference No.: 03001208

Significant dates
- Added to NRHP: November 28, 2003
- Removed from NRHP: December 26, 2023

Shawmut Diner is an historic diner formerly located at 943 Shawmut Avenue in New Bedford, Massachusetts.

The diner was built in 1953. In 1983 the Paleologos family bought and updated the diner. The diner was added to the National Register of Historic Places in 2003, and was delisted in 2023. It has been featured on the Food Channel.

The Shawmut Diner closed for business on March 31, 2014. It was moved to the Bristol County House of Corrections in nearby Dartmouth, Massachusetts in May 2014. It has been replaced by a Cumberland Farms.

== See also ==
- National Register of Historic Places listings in New Bedford, Massachusetts
