= Amelia Piper =

American former slave and abolitionist

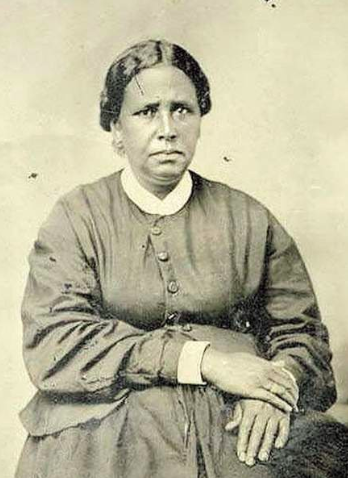
- Born: Amelia c. 1796; Alexandria, Virginia
- Died: 1856 (aged 59–60)
- Known for: Abolitionist, organizer, conductor on the Underground Railroad
- Spouse: William Piper (before 1820)
- Children: Amelia Davis; Augustus Piper; Philip Piper; Rebecca Olmstead; Robert H. Piper; Sarah Roshier
- Relatives: Elizabeth Piper Ensley (granddaughter)

Amelia Piper (c. 1796–1856) was a former slave and abolitionist, who organized anti-slavery fairs, was a manager of the New Bedford Female Union Society, and was a fundraiser for the abolition of slavery. She and her husband were conductors on the Underground Railroad. She worked within the African-American community and the greater New Bedford, Massachusetts community to coordinate the efforts of others to provide lives of freedom to those who had been enslaved.

== Personal life ==
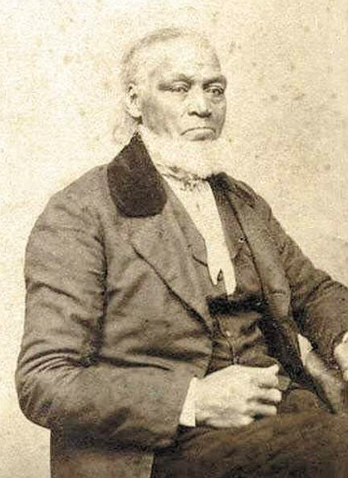
William Piper, former slave, abolitionist, Underground Railroad conductor

Amelia J. Piper, born in Alexandria, Virginia, was married to William Piper (1786–1870), both of whom had been enslaved. Piper, her husband, and four children left Alexandria on a shipping vessel for New Bedford, Massachusetts between 1826 and 1830. Family legend contends that they traveled on a schooner owned by the Rotch family. Generations of the Piper family worked for William Rotch Rodman as ship workers, domestics, and farm hands. New Bedford was a haven for fugitive slaves; Slavery ended in Massachusetts in 1783 and New Bedford sea captains and crew members, who traded along the Atlantic coast, helped people escape slavery.

William was a domestic servant and hostler for William Rotch Rodman, who earned his income from the banking and whaling industries. Piper, known for his skill in caring for horses, lived near Rodman (Note: The Pipers lived at 46 (now 58) Bedford Street, less than two blocks from the Rodmans on Country Street. Former slaves often became part of the middle class in New Bedford.) and worked for him for decades. The New Bedford Republican Standard states in 1854 that William, "in the employ of William R. Rodman for a number of years, and by his integrity and great fidelity to the trusts committed to his charge, has won for himself an honorable name." William, like his wife, was an activist and community leader.

Amelia and William had at least six children. Robert H. Piper (1814–1875) was a mariner from the 1830s through the 1850s, including having worked aboard the ship Jefferson in 1841. Robert was also a waiter for Rodman from 1845 and likely into the 1850s. Robert's wife, Alexine, died in 1885. Philip, born about 1820, worked on the Rebecca Simms in 1839, when he lived at 87 S. Sixth Street, the family home of William and Amelia. It was sold in 1841. Married to Jane Gibson, Philip and his wife had a daughter Elizabeth Piper Ensley, who was a civil rights advocate, suffragette, and educator. (Note: Jane Gibson was a slave who was brought to New Bedford with her mother, her sister, and her half-siblings in 1834 by her master. They were brought to the home of Nathan Johnson at 21 Seventh Street home, at the request of Patrick Gibson. Betsey Gibson was his concubine and Patrick wanted to have her cared for and educated. Jane and her sister, Helen, were Betsey and Patrick's daughters. Patrick died unexpectedly and his business associate asked that the women were returned to Georgia. Johnson kept the women, realizing that they would return to a life of slavery.) Amelia and William's daughter, Sarah, married William H. Roshier, who also worked for William Rotch Rodman for a number of years. Their daughter Amelia married Daniel B. Davis, a boot and shoe maker. Amelia and William also had a child named Augustus and a daughter, Rebecca G. Piper, born about 1839 who married Moses Olmstead on February 23, 1871. Olmstead, two years her senior, was a clothing dealer from Norfolk, Virginia. Amelia and William were members of the Second Baptist Church and William was a deacon there.

== Abolitionist ==
[We meet to] ply our needles and fingers, to talk over the wrongs of our countrymen and women in chains, and pray that the time will soon come when every yoke shall be broken—when all oppression, whether it be southern slavery or northern prejudice, shall cease in our land and the world.

— Managers of the New Bedford Female Union Society, including Amelia Piper, The Liberator

On January 1, 1840, Piper organized one of the first anti-slavery fairs in New Bedford, Massachusetts. The money was used for the Massachusetts Anti-Slavery Society; to fund abolitionist's speaking tours; and to help support The Liberator, an anti-slavery newspaper. Sometimes funds were used to ensure that fugitive slaves were not returned to slavery. The money was made by selling baked goods, handmade items, and autographs of noted women and men. She was one of the New Bedford Female Union Society managers. The organization was formed by African-American women to defeat slavery.

== Underground Railroad ==
With her husband, Piper helped fugitive slaves attain their freedom, like John S. Jacobs, the brother of Harriet Jacobs, an abolitionist and writer. The Pipers provided housing and helped people transition to a life of freedom. Piper's name, and that of her husband and son Robert, are mentioned in the slave narratives of people who came through New Bedford. She is also mentioned in the anti-slavery newspaper, The Liberator.

== Death and legacy ==
Amelia died on March 10, 1856, in New Bedford. William and Amelia Piper are buried at the Oak Grove Cemetery in New Bedford, Massachusetts.

The Piper's children and grandchildren also worked to end slavery and vie for equitable civil rights.
