= Howland Mill Village Historic District =

Historic district in Massachusetts, United States

- U.S. National Register of Historic Places
- U.S. Historic district
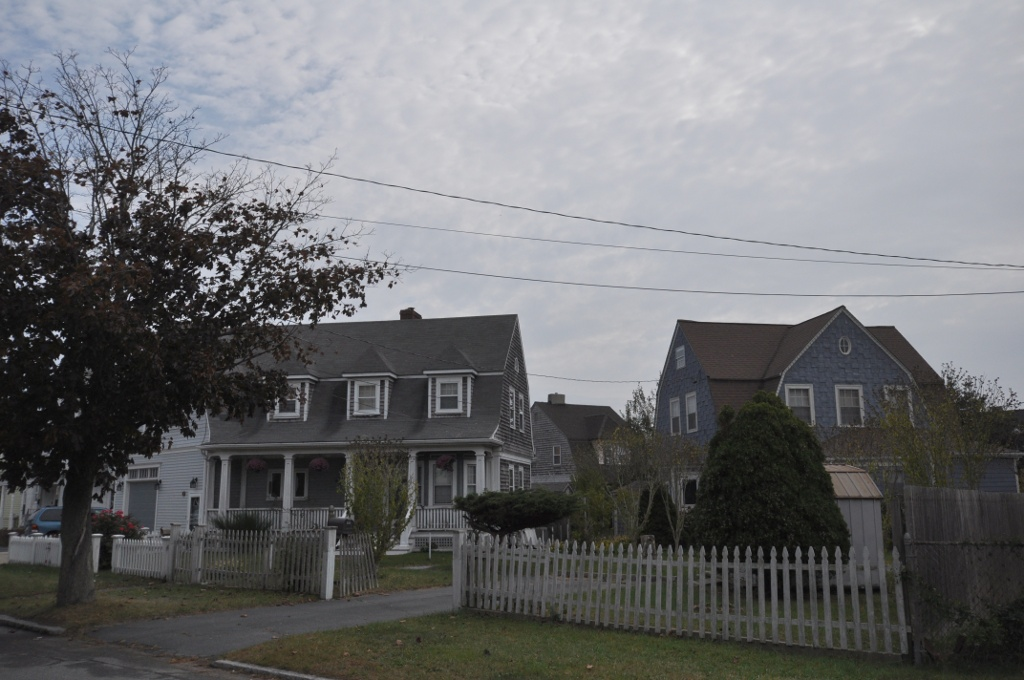

- Location within Massachusetts Location within the United States
- Location: New Bedford, Massachusetts
- Coordinates: 41°36′58″N 70°56′0″W
- Area: 9.9 acres (4.0 ha)
- Built: 1888
- Architect: Wheelwright and Haven
- Architectural style: Queen Anne, Colonial Revival
- NRHP reference No.: 96000609
- Added to NRHP: May 30, 1996

The Howland Mill Village Historic District is a historic district roughly bounded by Bolton, Winsper, Hemlock Sts., and Rockdale Avenue in New Bedford, Massachusetts. It consists of a collection of single-family mill worker housing units constructed in 1888-89 for workers at the nearby Howland Mill, and several double-decker houses built in the 1920s. The districts uniformity of style is apparent despite some exterior alterations: there are only two basic house plans. The Howland Mill Company was founded in 1886, and its mills were used in production (under a variety of names and owners) until 1954. Most of the housing was sold off in the 1910s.

The district was added to the National Register of Historic Places in 1996.

== See also ==
- National Register of Historic Places listings in New Bedford, Massachusetts
