= Thomas Donaghy School =

- U.S. National Register of Historic Places
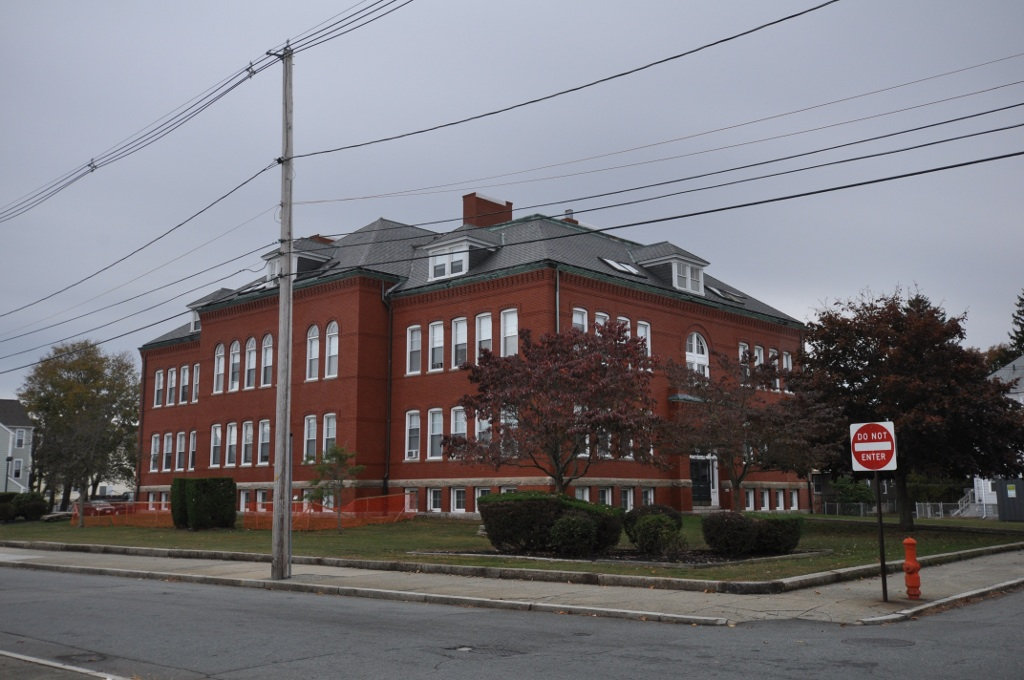

- Location within Massachusetts Location within the United States
- Location: 68 South St., New Bedford, Massachusetts
- Coordinates: 41°37′33″N 70°55′25″W
- Built: 1905
- Architect: Samuel C. Hunt
- Architectural style: Romanesque Revival
- NRHP reference No.: 89000041
- Added to NRHP: March 2, 1989

The Thomas Donaghy School is a historic school building at 68 South Street in New Bedford, Massachusetts. It is a two-story brick structure, roughly rectangular in shape, with a truncated hip roof pierced by hip roof dormers. Sections project on the eastern and western facades of the building. The Romanesque Revival-style school was designed by locally prominent architect Samuel C. Hunt, and built in 1905. It is the city's oldest surviving "modern" school building.

The building was listed on the National Register of Historic Places in 1989.

== See also ==
- National Register of Historic Places listings in New Bedford, Massachusetts
