= Jewish Cemetery of New Bedford =

Historic cemetery in Bristol County, Massachusetts

- Jewish Cemetery
- U.S. National Register of Historic Places
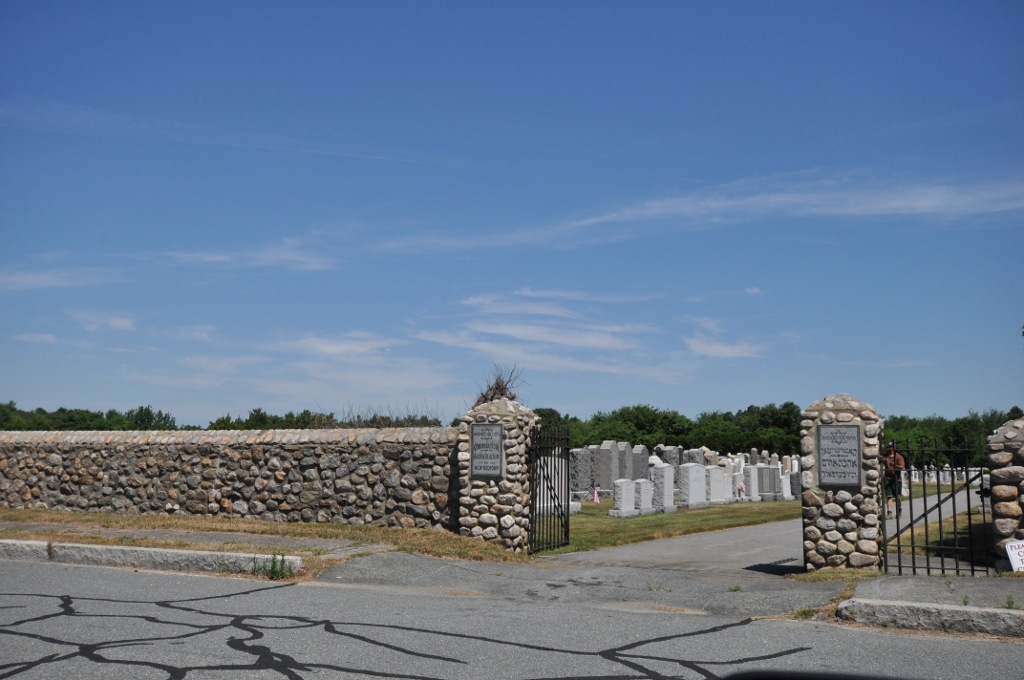

- Location within Massachusetts Location within the United States
- Location: Old Plainville Road, New Bedford, Massachusetts
- Coordinates: 41.680813°N 70.967005°W
- Built: 1898
- NRHP reference No.: 14000155

The Jewish Cemetery of New Bedford, Massachusetts is located in the far north of the city, on Old Plainville Road, just north of New Bedford Regional Airport. The cemetery was established in 1898 as the principal burying ground for two congregations, Chesed Shel Emes and Ahavath Achim. It is the second Jewish cemetery in the city; the first, a small section of Peckham West Cemetery, was filled up in the 1890s. The developed portion of the cemetery lands is about 13 acres (5.3 ha), with another 24.5 acres (9.9 ha) that is undeveloped forest. The cemetery land is now owned by a number of organizations: the Tifereth Israel congregation owns about 19 acres (7.7 ha), Ahavath Achim owns 5.25 acres (2.12 ha), and two small parcels are owned by other organizations. Entrances to the cemetery are marked by stone posts with bronze plaques. There is also the Temple Sinai section that sits in the grounds of the New Bedford airport that was accessible from the Old Plainville Road but is now blocked off.

The cemetery was listed on the National Register of Historic Places in 2014. It is noted for its significance with the growth of the Jewish community in New Bedford, and for its encapsulation of changing Jewish funerary customs, and their difference from those of other ethnic and religious groups.

== See also ==
- National Register of Historic Places listings in New Bedford, Massachusetts
