= Nathan and Mary (Polly) Johnson properties =

Historic houses in Massachusetts, United States

- Johnson Properties
- U.S. National Register of Historic Places
- U.S. National Historic Landmark
- U.S. Historic district – Contributing property
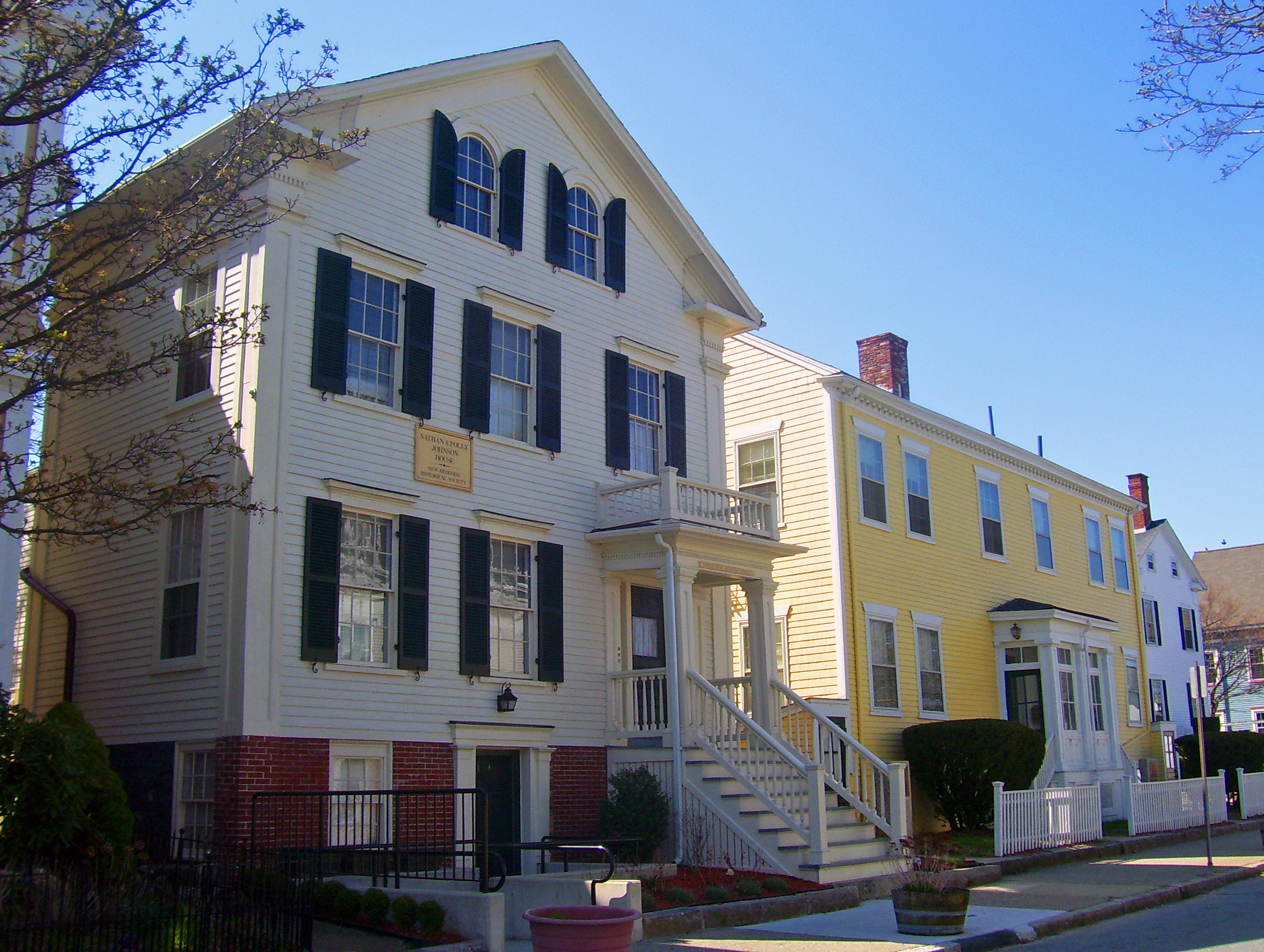

- Location within Massachusetts Location within the United States
- Location: New Bedford, MA
- Coordinates: 41°37′59″N 70°55′44″W
- Area: 2.4 acres (0.97 ha)
- Built: 1829
- Architectural style: Federal, Greek Revival
- Part of: County Street Historic District (ID76000229)
- NRHP reference No.: 00000260

Significant dates
- Added to NRHP: February 16, 2000
- Designated NHL: February 16, 2000
- Designated CP: August 11, 1976

The Nathan and Mary (Polly) Johnson properties are a National Historic Landmark at 17–19 and 21 Seventh Street in New Bedford, Massachusetts. Originally the building consisted of two structures, one dating to the 1820s and an 1857 house joined with the older one shortly after construction. They have since been restored and now house the New Bedford Historical Society. The two properties are significant for their association with leading members of the abolitionist movement in Massachusetts, and as the only surviving residence in New Bedford (out of three known) of Frederick Douglass. Nathan and Polly Johnson were free African-Americans who are known to have sheltered escaped slaves using the Underground Railroad from 1822 on. Both were also successful in local business; Nathan as a caterer and Polly as a confectioner.

== Description ==
The Johnson properties consist of two buildings, one built as a residence, the other as a Quaker meetinghouse. The meetinghouse, at 17–19 Seventh Street, is a 2 1/2-story wood-frame structure, six bays wide, with a gable roof, and rests on a brick foundation. Built in 1785, it originally stood where the present brick meetinghouse stands, and was moved when the new one was built c. 1823. This building was purchased by Nathan Johnson in 1832 and converted to residential use. Its main entrance is via a pair of doors inside an enclosed porch that projects on the east side (front) of the main block. A two-story ell extends to the west (rear) of the building. The building's interior has woodwork dating to the early 19th century, including a staircase with elaborately turned newel posts. One noteworthy feature of the interior is a trapdoor in the attic, which leads to a large space between the attic and the high ceilings of the first floor. This space has long been theorized to house fugitive slaves, but no evidence has been uncovered to support the idea.

The Johnson House, at 21 Seventh Street, appears to be composed of two separate structures which have been joined. The front block is a 2 1/2-story wood-frame structure, three bays wide, with a front-gable roof, and rests on a high brick foundation. It has some Greek Revival styling, including corner pilasters and gable returns, but its entrance porch is a later Victorian style. The entry is an eight-panel door, flanked by sidelight windows and topped by a transom. A basement entrance stands below the center bay of the house. Windows are rectangular sash on the first two levels and at the basement level, and there are a pair of round-arch Italianate windows in the attic level. This block appears to have been built in 1857, when Polly Johnson (in Nathan's absence) sought permission to move the original older house to the back of the lot. The rear ell, estimated to have been built about 1800, is a two-story structure with a steeply pitched roof. A c. 1970s shed-roof addition further extends the house to the west (rear).

== History ==
Nathan Johnson was born a free person of color in Philadelphia, and married Mary ("Polly") Durfee of New Bedford in 1819. The couple were in the employ of Charles Waln Morgan, a prominent whaling captain, as domestic servants in the 1820s, and were soon involved in the abolitionist cause. By 1845 the Johnsons had enough success in business that they owned the lot including these two buildings and an adjacent one (then numbered 23 Seventh Street, but no longer standing) which they used as a shop. In the 1850s Johnson was one of the wealthiest African Americans in the city. He was politically active in both organizations of African Americans and those involved in the abolitionist cause. Since New Bedford was a busy port doing business with southern states, it was a regular target for fleeing slaves, and Johnson is documented to have sheltered fugitives in his properties. He most famously gave shelter to Frederick Douglass, the escaped slave who credits Johnson with giving him the last name by which he is now widely known. Although Douglass lived only a short time at Johnson's home, it is the only one of his three residences in New Bedford to survive.

The house at 21 Seventh Street is now the home of the New Bedford Historical Society, and is open for tours by appointment. The two properties were designated a National Historic Landmark and listed on the National Register of Historic Places in 2000. The properties are also contributing elements to the local County Street Historic District.

== See also ==
- List of Underground Railroad sites
- List of National Historic Landmarks in Massachusetts
- National Register of Historic Places listings in New Bedford, Massachusetts
