= Hazelwood Park (New Bedford, Massachusetts) =

- U.S. National Register of Historic Places
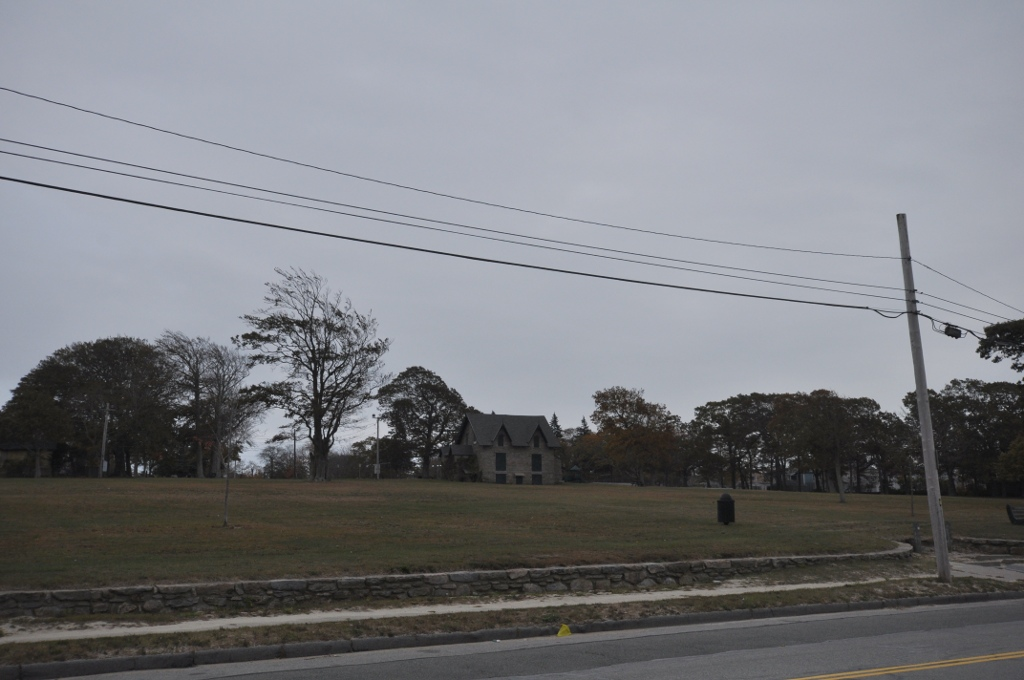
- View from Rodney French Boulevard up to the Congdon House

- Location within Massachusetts Location within the United States
- Location: 597-603 Brock Ave, New Bedford, Massachusetts
- Coordinates: 41.606°N 70.914°W
- Area: 23 acres (9.3 ha)
- Built: 1840
- Architect: William Durfee; Wheelwright and Haven; Louis E. Destremps
- Architectural style: Gothic Revival, Queen Anne
- NRHP reference No.: 10000389
- Added to NRHP: June 24, 2010

Hazelwood Park is a public park on Clark's Point in New Bedford, Massachusetts. The park occupies a plot of 23 acres (9.3 ha) on the west side of New Bedford's southern peninsula, between Rodney French Boulevard and Brock Avenue. It overlooks Clark's Cove which opens into Buzzards Bay. The park was listed on the National Register of Historic Places in 2010.

The park's origins lie in three country estates, which were established in the area during the 19th century. It takes its name from the estate of Joseph Congdon, whose 1839-40 Gothic Revival house stands near the center of the park. Congdon named his estate "Hazelwood", and built an English garden on the then-forested Clark's Point peninsula.

The park also has two later houses: the Coffin-Howland House, which may contain portions of Congdon's carriage house, is fire-damaged and fenced off, and the Howland House, built in 1890, is located near Brock Avenue, and is dominated by its large carriage house and stable.

By the late 1890s, development had encroached on the area, and the city of New Bedford was purchasing land for use as public parks. It acquired the Hazelwood property in 1902. It hired Warren Manning, who had previously worked for Frederick Law Olmsted, to plan the park.

== See also ==
- National Register of Historic Places listings in New Bedford, Massachusetts
