= Robert C. Ingraham School =

- U.S. National Register of Historic Places
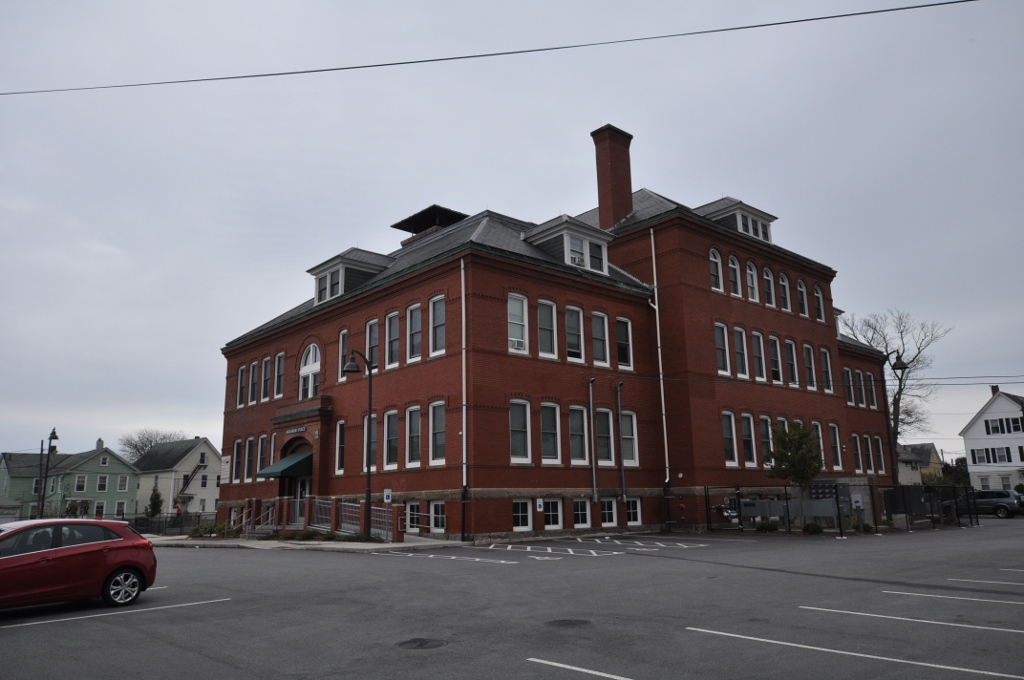

- Location within Massachusetts Location within the United States
- Location: 80 Rivet St., New Bedford, Massachusetts
- Coordinates: 41.6206°N 70.9223°W
- Area: 1.2 acres (0.49 ha)
- Built: 1901
- Architect: Samuel C. Hunt
- Architectural style: Romanesque
- NRHP reference No.: 10000056
- Added to NRHP: March 2, 2010

The Robert C. Ingraham School is a historic school building at 80 Rivet Street in New Bedford, Massachusetts. The three-story brick Romanesque Revival building was built in 1901 to a design by local architect Samuel C. Hunt, who designed several other New Bedford school buildings. It was built on a site previously owned by the Potomska Mill Company and used for mill worker housing, and was named for the first librarian of the New Bedford Free Public Library. The building served the city as an elementary school until 1977, and was used for storage until 1992. From 1992 until 2006 it housed a preschool.

The building was listed on the National Register of Historic Places in 2010.

== See also ==
- National Register of Historic Places listings in New Bedford, Massachusetts
