= County Street Historic District =

Historic district in Massachusetts, United States

- U.S. National Register of Historic Places
- U.S. Historic district
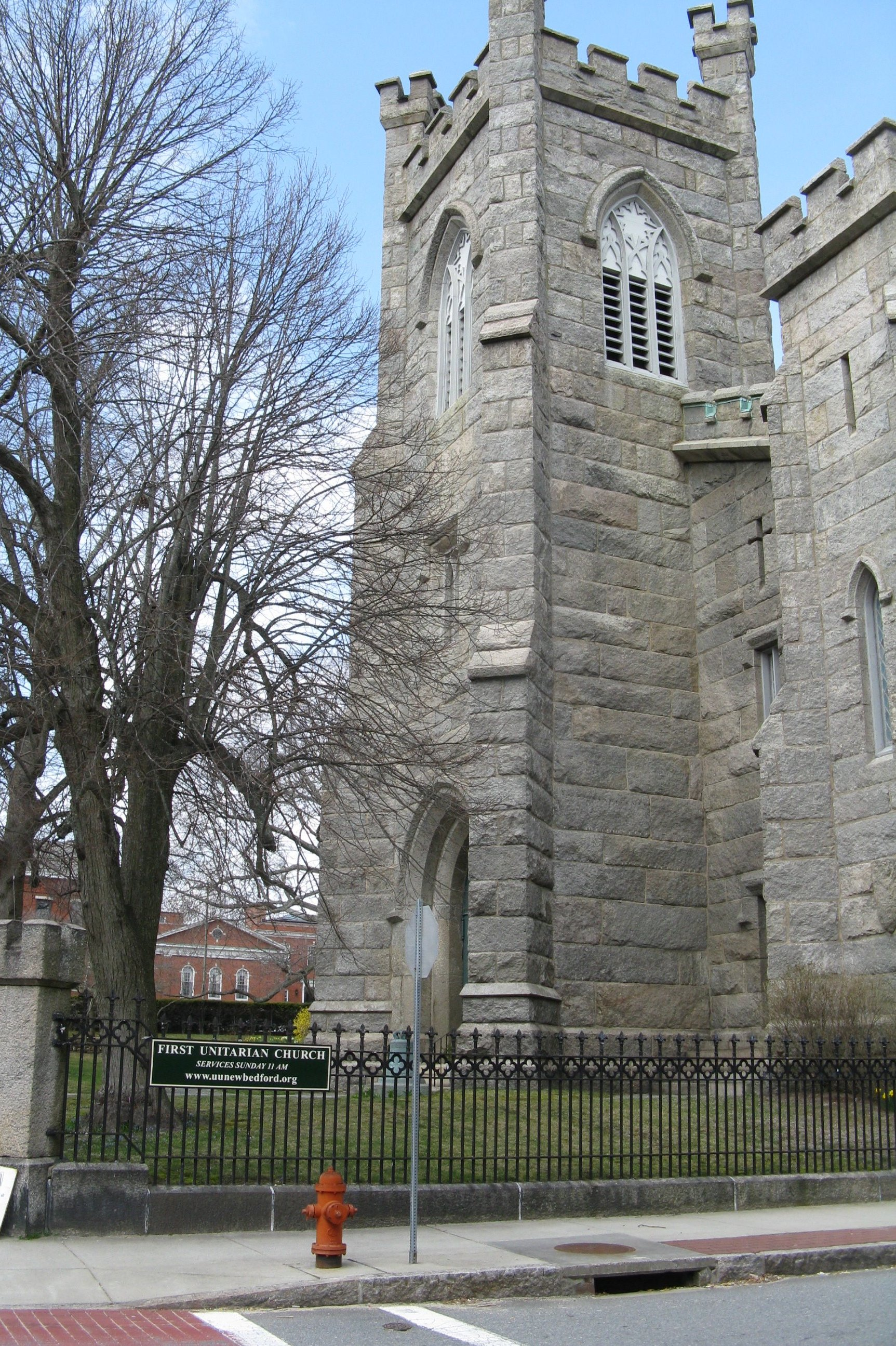
- First Unitarian Church

- Location within Massachusetts Location within the United States
- Location: New Bedford, Massachusetts
- Coordinates: 41°37′55″N 70°55′55″W
- Area: 100 acres (40 ha)
- Built: 1780
- Architect: Multiple
- Architectural style: Greek Revival, Late Victorian, Gothic Revival
- NRHP reference No.: 76000229
- Added to NRHP: August 11, 1976

The County Street Historic District is a historic district roughly bounded by Acushnet, Page, Middle, and Bedford streets (both sides) in New Bedford, Massachusetts, USA. The district was a fashionable residential area populated by the city's elite from 1780 to about 1890, and includes the city's major civic buildings, including City Hall, the public library, post office, and registry of deeds. County Street, its major roadway, was first laid out early in the 18th century.

The district was added to the National Register of Historic Places in 1976.

== See also ==
- National Register of Historic Places listings in New Bedford, Massachusetts
