= Nathaniel Cannon Smith =

American painter and architect

- Born: January 18, 1866; New Bedford, Massachusetts
- Died: 1943 (aged 76–77); New Bedford, Massachusetts
- Occupation: Architect
- Practice: Nat. C. Smith; Smith & Howland
- Buildings: Quequechan Club, New Bedford Textile Institute, Brockton Public Library

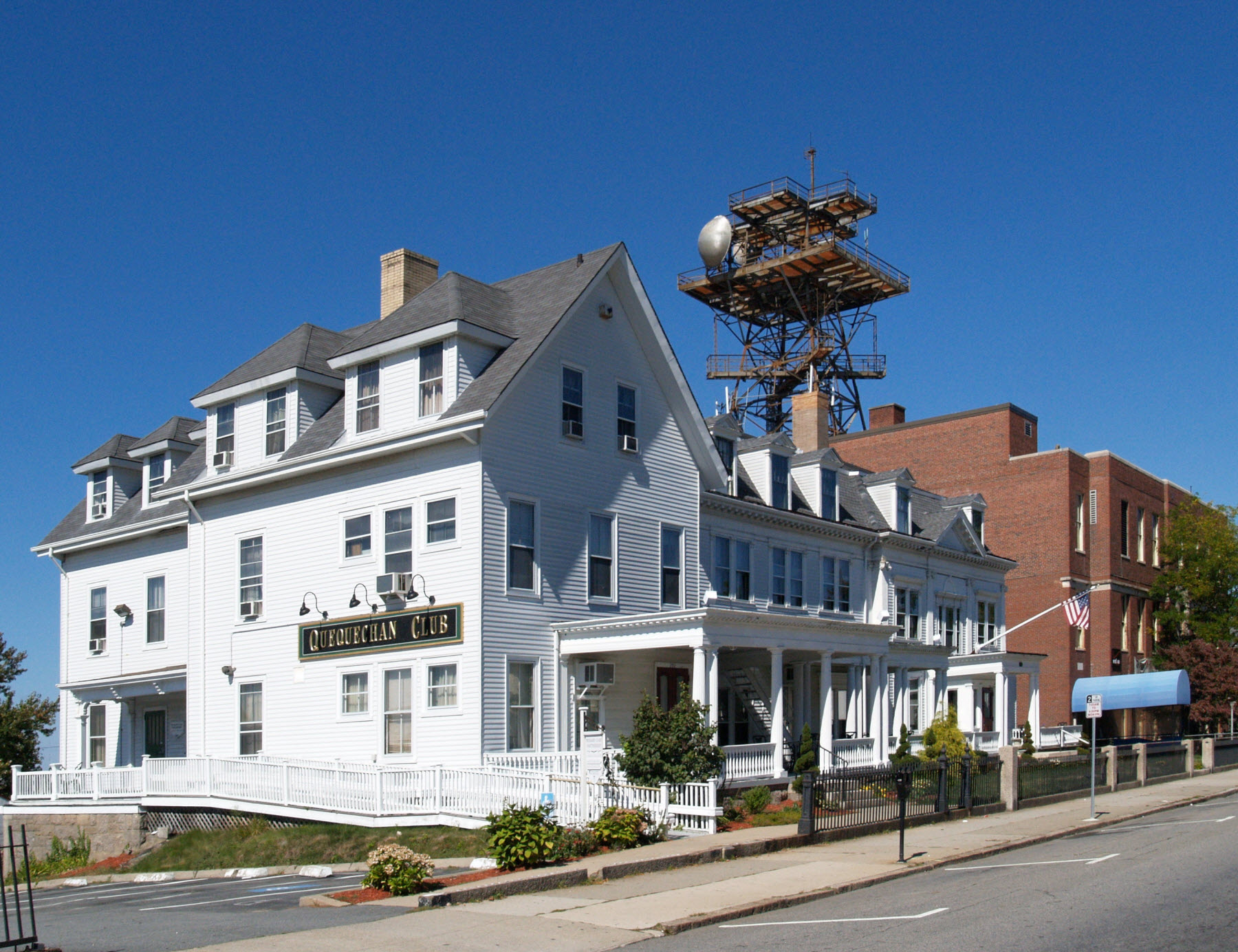
Quequechan Club, Fall River, 1896.

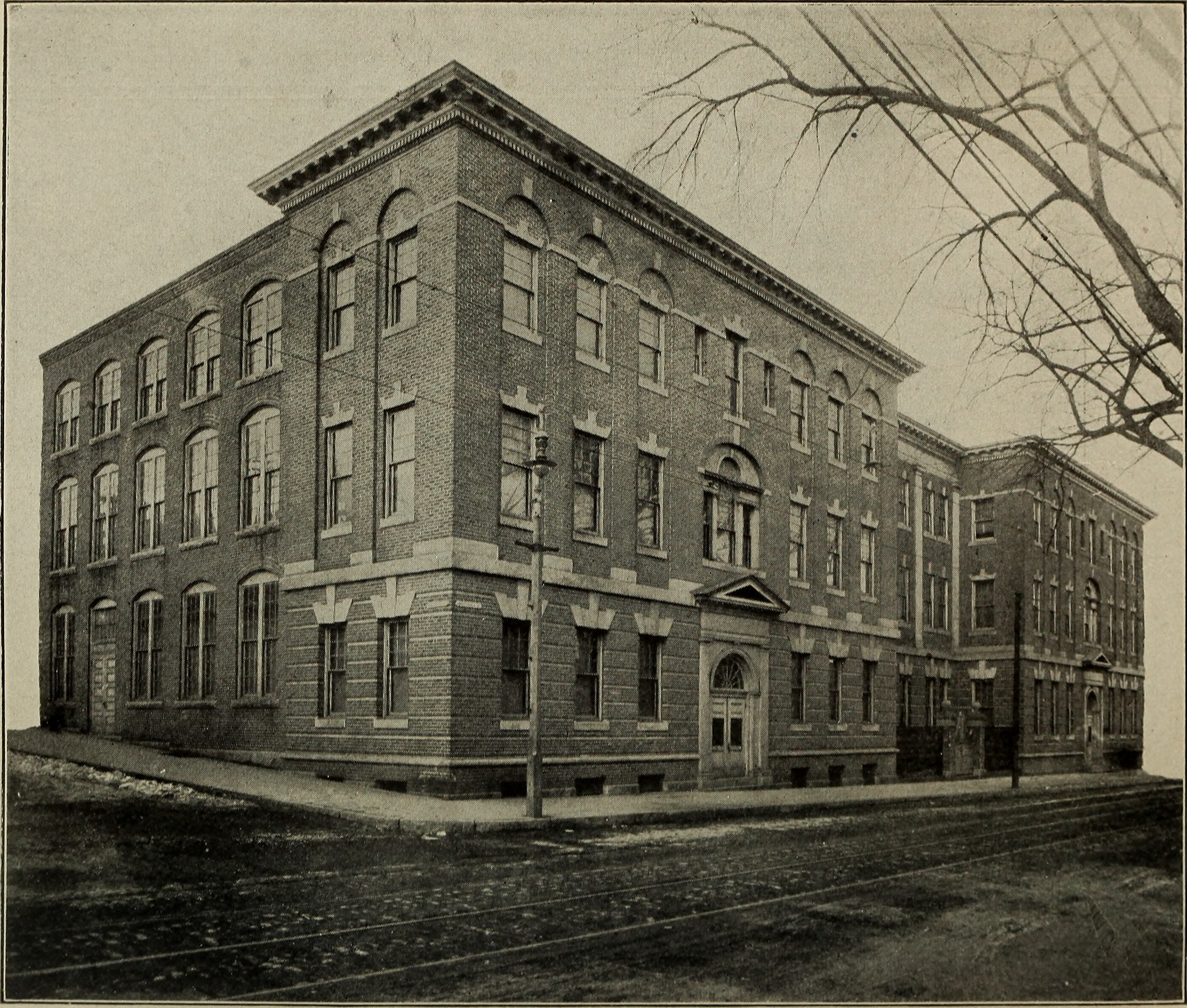
Textile Institute, New Bedford, 1898.

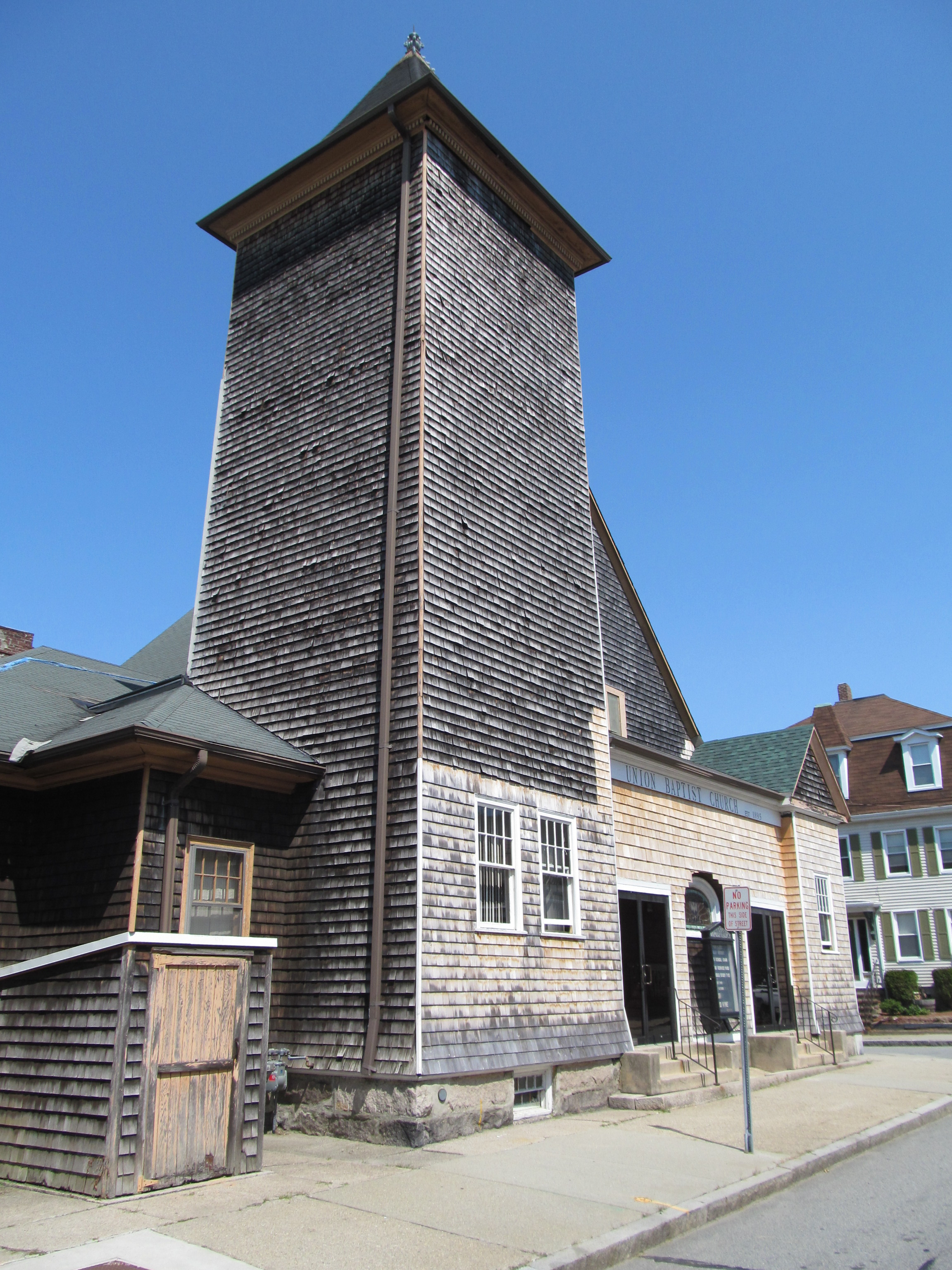
Union Baptist Church, New Bedford, 1899.

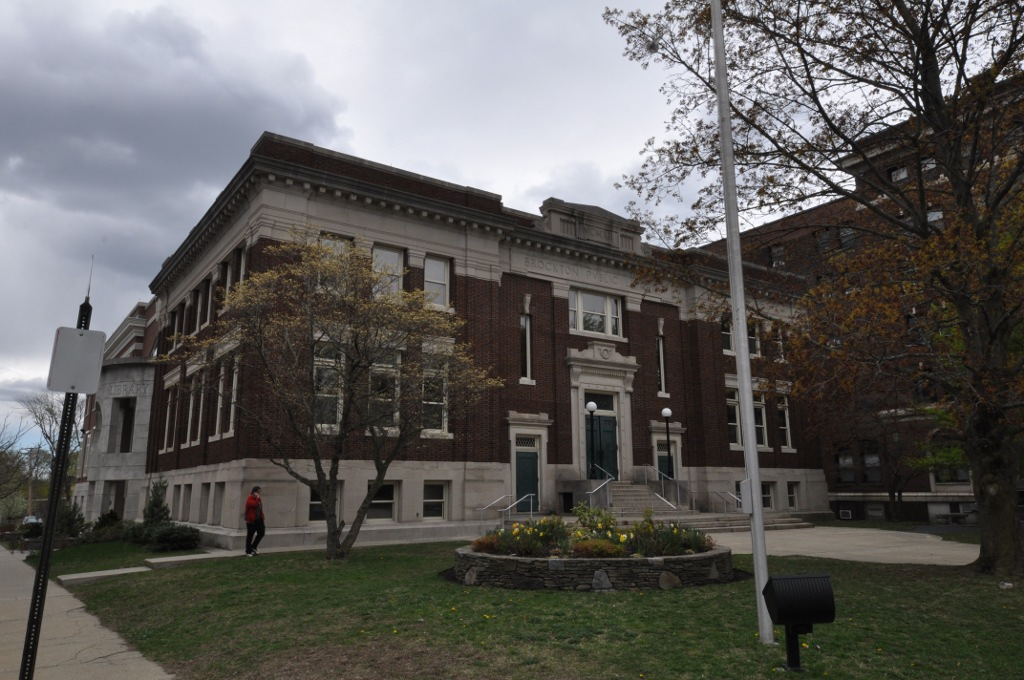
Brockton Public Library, Brockton, 1912.

Nathaniel Cannon Smith (1866–1943), professionally known as Nat. C. Smith, was an American painter and architect of New Bedford, Massachusetts.

== Life and career ==
Nathaniel Cannon Smith was born January 18, 1866, in New Bedford, Massachusetts, to William T. and Caroline A. (Brownell) Smith. He attended the New Bedford public schools, graduating from New Bedford High School in 1885. For the next three and one-half years he was a student and associate of Edward G. Dobbins, engraver and illustrator. Though he began to advance in that trade, he decided instead to study architecture, sailing for Paris in 1889. He was a student of the Beaux-Arts de Paris and was a member of the atelier of Henri Duray. In 1893 Smith returned to New Bedford, where he established himself as an architect. With the exception of the years 1913 to 1919, when he was in partnership with Myron P. Howland, Smith was a private practitioner for his entire career. He was in active practice until his retirement circa 1940.

== Personal life ==
Smith was deeply interested in art and was a long-time supporter and instructor of the Swain School of Design. In 1900 he became an associate of the Society of Beaux-Arts Architects, later known as the Beaux-Arts Institute of Design. For several years Smith operated a small architectural atelier in New Bedford, in association with the Institute. Smith was also a member of the Wamsutta Club and an organizer of the New Bedford Art Club, active from 1907 to 1920.

Smith married in 1897 to Alice M. Adams of New Bedford. They had one daughter.

Though an architect by profession, Smith was also a painter who exhibited in New Bedford and elsewhere.

Smith died in New Bedford in 1943.

== Legacy ==
Several buildings built to Smith's designs have been listed on the United States National Register of Historic Places, and others contribute to listed historic districts.

== Architectural works ==
=== Nat. C. Smith, 1893-1913 ===
- 1894 - Union for Good Works Building, 12 Market St, New Bedford, Massachusetts
- 1895 - William H. Wood House, 408 County St, New Bedford, Massachusetts
- 1896 - Quequechan Club, 306 N Main St, Fall River, Massachusetts
- 1896 - Thomas A. Thornton House, 114 Hawthorn St, New Bedford, Massachusetts
- 1897 - Dunbar Street School House (George H. Dunbar School), 338 Dartmouth Street, New Bedford, Massachusetts
- 1897 - Slocum Building, 908 Purchase St, New Bedford, Massachusetts
- 1898 - Edward H. Abbe Houses (6), Clinton Pl, New Bedford, Massachusetts
  - A planned cul-de-sac.
- 1898 - William L. Chadwick House, 117 Mill St, New Bedford, Massachusetts
- 1898 - New Bedford Textile Institute, 1213 Purchase St, New Bedford, Massachusetts
- 1899 - Union Baptist Church, 109 Court St, New Bedford, Massachusetts
- 1900 - John Duff House (Remodeling), 479 County St, New Bedford, Massachusetts
- 1902 - Bartholomew Gosnold Monument, Cuttyhunk, Massachusetts
- 1902 - Y. M. C. A. Building, 199 N Main St, Fall River, Massachusetts
- 1903 - Jennie Smith Grinnell House, 32 Maple St, New Bedford, Massachusetts
- 1909 - New Bedford Free Public Library (Remodeling), 613 Pleasant St, New Bedford, Massachusetts
- 1910 - Nathaniel C. Smith House, 1 Howland Ter, New Bedford, Massachusetts
  - Home of the architect.
- 1912 - Brockton Public Library, 304 Main St, Brockton, Massachusetts
- 1913 - The Whaleman, New Bedford Free Public Library

=== Smith & Howland, 1913-1919 ===
- 1913 - Ulrich C. Collette Building, 1566-1570 Acushnet Ave, New Bedford, Massachusetts
- 1914 - Thomas B. Wilcox, Jr. House, 9 Maple St, New Bedford, Massachusetts
- 1915 - Cummings Building, 96 William St, New Bedford, Massachusetts
- 1916 - Henry Watson House, 383 W Clifton St, New Bedford, Massachusetts
- 1917 - Office Building, Oak Grove Cemetery, New Bedford, Massachusetts

=== Nat. C. Smith, from 1919 ===
- 1919 - J. V. O'Neil House, 572 Rockdale Ave, New Bedford, Massachusetts
- 1921 - Clarence A. Cook School (Old), 91 Summer St, New Bedford, Massachusetts
- 1922 - Charles L. Neild House, 554 Rockdale Ave, New Bedford, Massachusetts
- 1923 - Tifereth Israel Synagogue (Old), 42 S 6th St, New Bedford, Massachusetts
- 1927 - Crapo Memorial Gallery, Swain School of Design, 19 Hawthorn St, New Bedford, Massachusetts
- 1934 - Warming House, Buttonwood Park, Oneida St, New Bedford, Massachusetts
