= William Jackson (minister) =

American minister and abolitionist (1818–1900)

- Born: August 16, 1818; Norfolk, Virginia, US
- Died: May 19, 1900 (aged 81); New Bedford, Massachusetts
- Burial place: Oak Grove Cemetery; New Bedford, Massachusetts
- Occupation: Minister

William Jackson (August 16, 1818 – May 19, 1900) was an American abolitionist, Underground Railroad agent, Baptist minister, and Union army chaplain. In 1859, Jackson founded the Salem Baptist Church, an African American congregation in New Bedford, Massachusetts. As chaplain of the 55th Massachusetts Infantry Regiment in 1863, he may have been the first Black man to receive a US army commission.

== Early life and naval service ==
Jackson was born on August 16, 1818, in Norfolk, Virginia, to Henry Jr. and Keziah Jackson. His free Black parents had been born into slavery but manumitted prior to his birth. Jackson's father was a river pilot who owned his own boat and reputedly ran British blockades during the War of 1812. In the wake of Nat Turner's Rebellion in 1831, the Jackson family relocated to the relative safety of Philadelphia, located in the free state of Pennsylvania. As a teenager during the 1830s, Jackson enlisted in the United States Navy. He served on the USS Vandalia and USS Grampus, which combated piracy and the slave trade across the Caribbean and Florida. His diaries recount severe storms and pursuits at sea. After leaving the Navy, Jackson returned to Philadelphia, where he worked briefly as a domestic servant before being called to the ministry.

== Life in Philadelphia ==
On September 16, 1842, Jackson was ordained a Baptist minister. For 12 years, he preached at the Oak Street Baptist Church, now Monumental Baptist Church in West Philadelphia, except for leaves to serve parishes in Newburgh, New York, and Wilmington, Delaware. He preached at Second Baptist Church in New Bedford, Massachusetts, in 1850 and later pastored the church in 1851–52. His wife and children remained in Philadelphia during these itinerant periods.

A lifelong abolitionist, Jackson served as a station agent on the Underground Railroad, helping freedom seekers to escape north to Canada. In 1854, he led a band of parishioners to liberate another member of the church, a freedom seeker who had been arrested by US marshals. The man was disguised and whisked away to freedom in Canada, but Jackson was arrested and spent time in the city jail. Supported by other Philadelphia ministers and notables, Jackson was soon released on a writ of habeas corpus. His actions had made Philadelphia too hot to hold him, so he relocated hastily and permanently to New Bedford, a city he knew well.

== Life in New England ==
In antebellum New Bedford, Jackson befriended Frederick Douglass and continued to work on the Underground Railroad, becoming a founding member of the New Bedford Vigilance Aid Society. He spoke against the mission of the American Colonization Society.

Jackson became pastor of the Second Baptist Church in New Bedford, serving from 1855 to 1859. His wife and children joined him, and the family settled into a house on Smith Street. With 95 parishioners, he left the Second Baptist Church in on December 7, 1858, to form the Salem Baptist Church, which he served as pastor until 1870. (The churches reunited in 1895 to form the Union Baptist Church.) He aided the formation of the American Baptist Missionary Convention in 1848 and the New England Missionary Baptist Convention in 1874. Both were influential, mostly Black Baptist communities that would coalesce into the National Baptist Convention. From 1870 to 1878, Jackson served as pastor of Congdon Street Baptist Church in Providence, Rhode Island, and subsequently of the Bethany Baptist Church in Newark, New Jersey. He retired from the ministry in 1884 and returned to New Bedford.

In 1871, Jackson purchased a summer home at 12 Central Avenue in Oak Bluffs, a resort community on Martha's Vineyard. After his retirement, he divided his time between New Bedford and Oak Bluffs. He was a respected member of the Martha’s Vineyard Camp Meeting Association and one of the first African Americans to own a home there. He hosted Frederick Douglass at his Oak Bluffs home in July 1876. In retirement, he moonlighted as town crier, walking the streets, ringing a bell, and announcing the news.

== Union army service ==
During the American Civil War, Jackson served as post co-chaplain of the African American 54th Massachusetts Infantry Regiment, alongside African Methodist Episcopal minister William Grimes, while the 54th was training in Readville. On July 14, 1863, Jackson joined the Union army as official chaplain of the 55th Massachusetts Infantry Regiment. Jackson may have been the first Black man to receive a US army commission. He accompanied the regiment when it deployed to Charleston, South Carolina, later that year. He resigned his commission in January 1864, reportedly because of ill health, and returned to his ministry in New Bedford.

== Family and legacy ==
On May 25, 1837, Jackson married Jane Adora Major (1814–1888), a Black woman originally from coastal Virginia, at a ceremony in Philadelphia. They had met at the Oak Street Baptist Church, where both were congregants. The Jacksons went on to have five sons and four daughters, only three of whom survived to adulthood: Emma, Mary, and Edgar. When the Civil War broke out in 1860, Jane Jackson convened a sewing circle of New Bedford women to make clothing and raise funds to supply Union troops. Circa 1900, her sewing group became the 11th Auxiliary Sewing Circle of the Grand Army of the Republic, a Civil War veterans' organization.

Rev. Jackson died in New Bedford on May 19, 1900. He, his wife, and four generations of Jacksons are buried in New Bedford's Oak Grove Cemetery. His papers, including his personal journal, are held in the collections of the New Bedford Whaling Museum.
