= Swain School of Design =

Design School in Massachusetts (1881–1988)

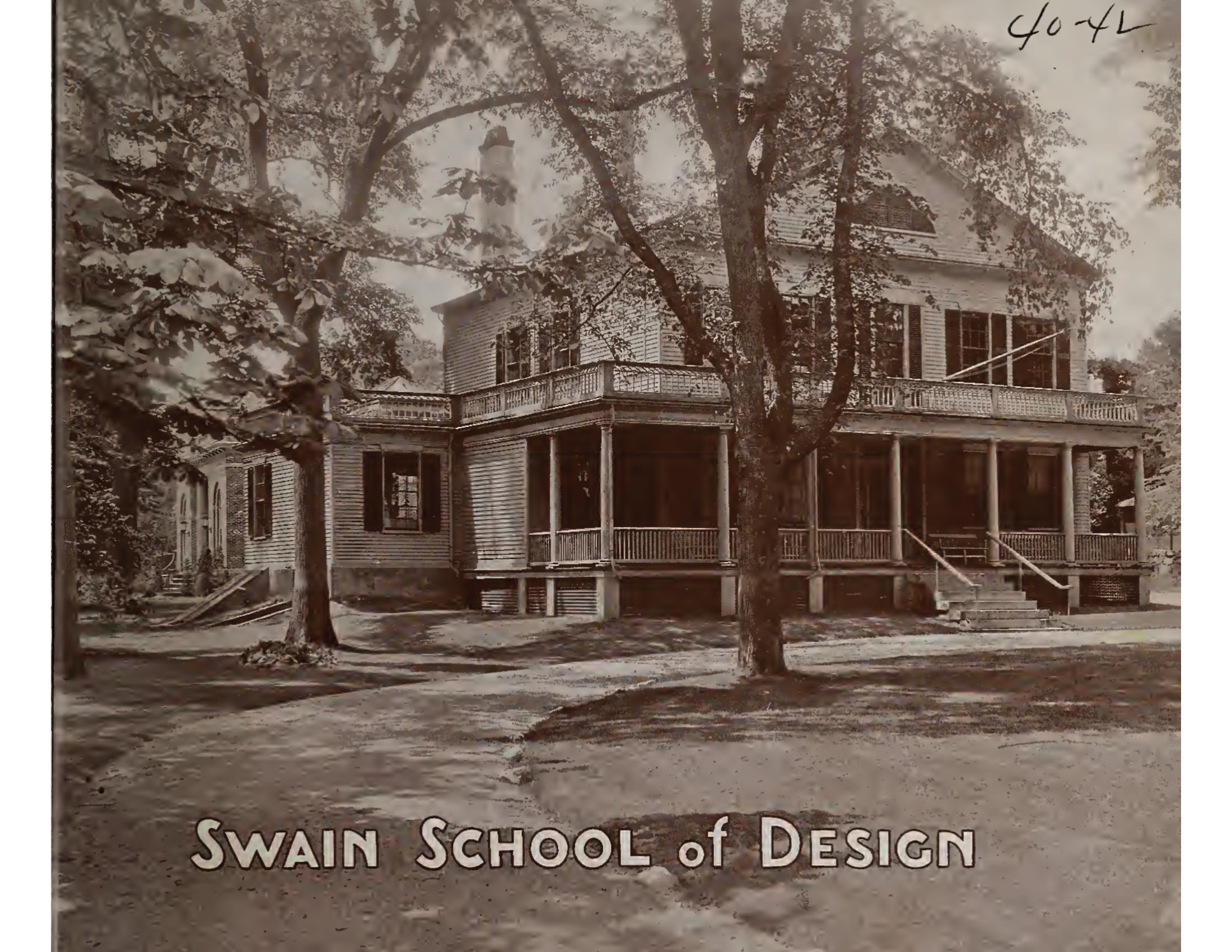
- The Swain bequest, the first of 13 campus buildings, burnt to the ground in 1948.
- Former names: Swain Free School (1881-1902), Swain Free School of Design (1903-1920)
- Distinction: 12th oldest U.S. art school
- Merged: 1988
- Notable faculty: Sigmund Abeles, Ron Kowalke, Alphonse Mattia, Joyce Reopel, Nathaniel Cannon Smith, Mel Zabarsky
- Type: Fine arts school
- Established: March 18, 1881
- Founder: William W. Swain
- Location: New Bedford, Massachusetts
- Campus: Historic architecture, including the Rodman Building on the National Register of Historic Places

The Swain School of Design (1881–1988) was an independent tuition-free non-profit school of higher learning in New Bedford, Massachusetts. It first defined its mission as a "school of design" for the "application of art to the industries" in 1902, making it the 12th oldest art school in the United States. By then, the 19th-century whaling capital of the world was already in a textile boom, one that required designers. In response, Swain's trustees developed a meticulous program of study. In the first year, students would train for 40 hours a week in "Pure Design" to prepare them for a second year in "Historic Design." Applied skills spanned a panoply of techniques, involving the design of picture frames, book and magazine covers, illuminations, lettering, stained glass, metalwork, architectural moldings and the "application of ornament to prints." Within a generation, that foresight had made New Bedford, with nearly 70 mills and 41,000 mill workers, the richest city per capita in the U.S.

In 1921, the school removed the word "free" from its name, instituted a range of fees, and began providing options for diplomas and certificates. That's also when they created a teacher training program, and an Atelier Swain, modeled on the principles of instruction at the influential École des Beaux-Arts in Paris, with multiple annual competitions. In 1925, they built the William W. Crapo Gallery, where frequent exhibitions and lectures were held, featuring well-known artists. The school's mission was no longer limited to providing applied training in the arts to the city's poor, but also to "rais[e] the standard of artistic knowledge, and appreciation" for its wealthy potential benefactors.

But the boom was effectively over by the 1930s. A glut of mills and growing competition from the South had decreased profits. Lower profits meant lower wages, and led to strikes. By the 1940s, America was back at war, fabrics were rationed, and the mills were repurposed for the military.

In the 1950s and 1960s, Swain focused on the fine arts during a post-war surge of interest in American Art. The school created new undergraduate degree programs in painting, printmaking, sculpture and graphic design. Then they hired professional artists, with European or émigré training and exhibition histories, to staff them. The new faculty included Sigmund Abeles (1934–), Ron Kowalke (1936–2021), Alphonse Mattia (1947–2023), Joyce Reopel (1933–2019), Nathaniel Cannon Smith (1866–1943), Mel Zabarsky (1932–2019). By 1969, New York City's Parsons School of Design was accepting more than 40 percent of Swain's students in its graduate programs. In response, Swain created a Bachelor of Fine Arts (BFA) degree, and graduated its first dozen BFAs the following year.

In 1985, Swain created more degree programs: undergraduate and graduate degrees in "ceramics, fiber, metal, and wood as part of a transfer agreement with Boston University's Program in Artisanry." In the same year, Swain introduced a one-year certificate and a baccalaureate program in Architectural Artisanry, which was aimed at both novice students as well as those seeking retraining. But the program never took off. In 1988, spurred by low enrollment and a financially struggling city, the school sold its New Bedford campus, and merged with Southeastern Massachusetts University's College of Visual and Performing Arts in nearby North Dartmouth.

Swain's archives are now part of the since renamed University of Massachusetts Dartmouth archive. In 1999, the New Bedford Art Museum curated an exhibition of notable Swain student and faculty work called "Swain Resurgent."

== History ==
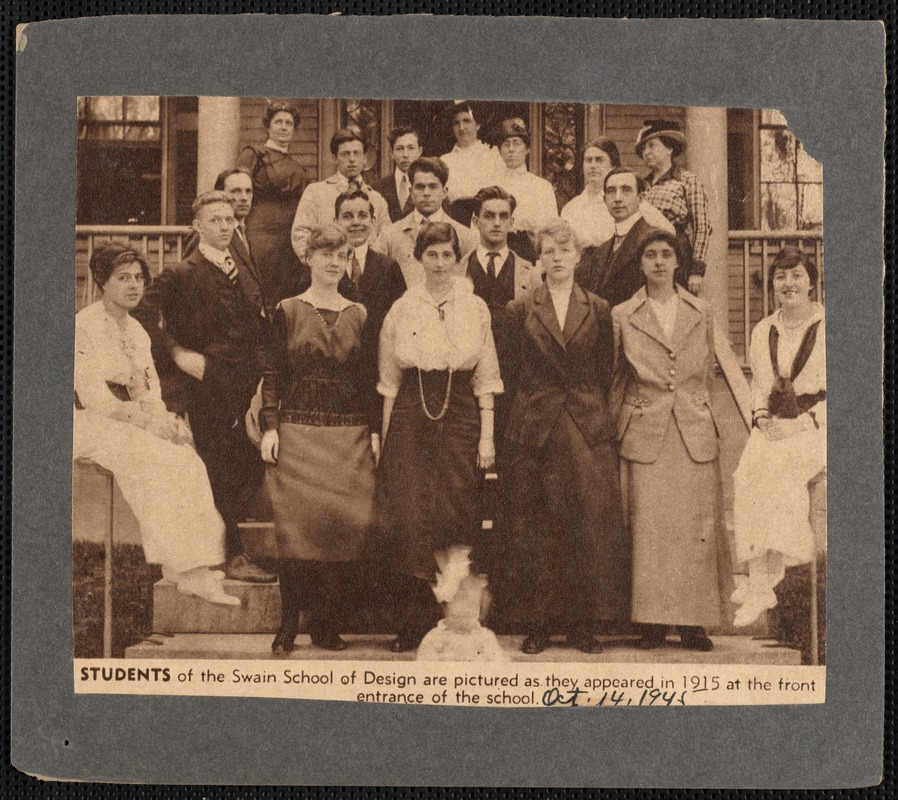
Students in 1915 at the front entrance of the Swain School of Design, New Bedford, MA.

=== Liberal arts (1882–1902) ===
The "Swain Free School" was founded in 1881 through the provisions of the estate of William W. Swain (1793–1858), a shipping-and-oil magnate. Swain had already bequeathed his mansion to the school in 1858, and that served as Swain's first building until it burned to the ground in 1948. Ultimately, however, the campus would comprise some thirteen buildings, including the purpose-built New Bedford Textile School, two residence halls and the Rodman Mansion, listed on the National Register of Historic Places.

In 1882, the Board of Trustees appointed Francis F. Gummere as the school's first president, and the school opened on October 25 of that year. For its first 20 years, the school provided a well-rounded liberal arts instruction in languages, literature, history, education, art and chemistry. Aimed at local residents without means, students' only financial obligation to the school was a mandatory deposit of $10 per semester as a measure of good faith.

Once the "whaling center of the world," there were slow but steady signs that New Bedford might also become the textile center of the world. The first mill was built in New Bedford in 1835. By the mid-19th century, housing was being built adjacent to the mills in "mill districts," and the city was attracting large numbers of immigrants seeking work. Once the "richest city per capita in the United States, if not in the world, during the whaling boom, the town fathers determined that to achieve that level of prosperity all over again, textiles required textile designers, and that was the need Swain School sought to meet.

=== Design (1902–1930s) ===
In 1902, the trustees set a course for Swain as a "school of design." With a rigorous curriculum requiring 40 full-time hours a week, students were trained in "Pure Design" in the first year to prepare for the second in "Historic Design." Annual catalogues, then called "circulars," were student-designed and competitively selected every year, and exhibitions and lectures were free, frequent and focused on well-known artists. The second year curriculum focused on mastering technique in historically correct ways: the design of picture frames, book and magazine covers, illuminations, lettering, stained glass, metalwork, architectural moldings and the "application of ornament to prints." This approach lasted a generation.

By 1920, however, the city had grown richer per capita than during its whaling days. The 1921–22 circular showed the school's leadership no longer sought to attract only the people without means, but also sought to build the city's cultural appreciation, in a manner appropriate for a city with immense wealth. Although the circular still described the tuition as "free," the word was no longer included in the school's formal name, the endowment was described as "limited," and fees between $5 and $25 were introduced, depending on whether students attended day, evening or Saturday morning classes. In the book 100 Boston Artists, the late painter and photographer Steven Trefonides (1926–2021) mentioned trading campus labor for classes at age 12, which could reflect that he did not meet the required admission age of 14 or could not afford the fees — or both.

The circular described the school's expanded mission this way:

The Swain School of Design is directing a limited endowment toward raising the standard of artistic knowledge, and appreciation in this community. It aims to give its pupils a knowledge of the fundamental principles of artistic design, a skill of hand and a facility of invention. It seeks to accent the relation of Art and Industry. Many of the Courses of Study are planned to practically teach the theory of design that the pupils may apply the principles of Art to the requirements of Trade and Manufacture.

The school's revised approach to art study offered general studies in art and design, teacher training, arts and crafts, architecture, jewelry and metal, ceramics, painting and sketching. In addition to frequent exhibitions, an Art Club was created, with attached models' fees. After a year-long course, students were eligible to earn a certificate and, after three, a diploma.

In 1925, the school built the William W. Crapo Gallery. On the main floor, it had a large central exhibition hall and student lounge. Programs included a series of lectures on art and important exhibitions of 19th and 20th century masterpieces, a yearly drawing show and surveys of the work of significant contemporary artists. An "Atelier Swain," had already been introduced by then. Modeled on the principles of instruction at the influential École des Beaux-Arts in Paris, its aim was to organize thirty-five competitions a year, which were showcased at the gallery.

As it turned out, however, 1920 was the peak of New Bedford's textile boom. By the 1930s, too many northern cities had built too many mills, and work was migrating to the less expensive South. Wages plummeted, and labor unrest followed, as did another war.

=== Fine arts (1950s–1960s) ===
In the post-war 1950s and 1960s, the school took a turn toward the fine arts by hiring artists to staff new programs "in painting, printmaking, sculpture, graphic design and the Bachelor of Fine Arts curriculum." The new faculty, all professional artists, with exhibition experience in Boston and New York City, helped make Swain "one of finest small art schools in America," generating more than 40 percent of the graduate students at New York City's Parsons School of Design. By then, the abstract expressionists had made a name for New York City, and suddenly New York had replaced Paris as the influential global center of Western art. Boston, meanwhile, had a vibrant art scene of its own.

=== Certificates, artisanry and fine arts degrees (1970s–1988) ===
Starting in the mid-1960s, and extending until the early 1980s, civil rights marches, anti-war protests and steady inflation contributed to a growing mistrust of traditional authority and chronological history, and which had a negative impact on Swain's fortunes. By the 1970s, Swain only had 100 students enrolled at any given time, despite graduating a dozen students with a BFA a year after the program was created. As the 1980s ushered in a pro-business pop culture era, Swain doubled down on its instruction in the skills of master craftsmen, creating undergraduate and graduate degrees in "ceramics, fiber, metal, and wood as part of a transfer agreement with Boston University's Program in Artisanry in 1985, the same year they introduced both a certificate program and a bachelor's degree program in Architectural Artisanry."

In keeping with Swain's century-long approach to the applied arts and contextualized by a city with both an historic district and a central historic district, both of which are listed in the National Register of Historic Places, the focus was on providing a complex array of highly specialized artisanry, meant to serve the entire gamut of building trades: architectural restoration, rehabilitation or new construction. Thus, the curriculum included training for "ornamental plasterers; metal workers; decorative brick, stone and concrete masons; wood cabinet makers; ornamental carpenters; architectural ceramic artists." But only three years later, due to high costs and low enrollment, Swain shut its doors. In 1988, the school merged with Southeastern Massachusetts University's College of Visual and Performing Arts. Its archive is now part of the University of Massachusetts Dartmouth, within the College of Visual and Performing Arts and the Claire T. Carney Library.

== Notable faculty ==
- Sigmund Abeles
- Jacqueline Block
- Jim Bobrick
- Nathaniel Cannon Smith
- Tom Corey
- Russell Daly
- Dick Dougherty
- Severin Haines
- Leo Kelly
- Nicolas Kilmer
- Ron Kowalke
- Ed Lazansky
- David Loeffler Smith
- Benjamin Martinez
- Alphonse Mattia^{[1][2]}
- John Osbourne
- Joyce Reopel
- Marc St. Pierre
- Robin Taffler
- Steven Trefonides
- Melvin Zabarsky

== Notable alumni ==
- Dennis Broadbent
- Eliza (Lidie) Collins
- Meredith Wildes-Cornell
- William D'Elia
- Richard Dougherty
- Leonard Dufresne
- Severin (Sig) Haines
- John Hopkins
- Robert (Tex) Lavery
- Scattergood Moore

== Gallery ==
(Note: Selections are from student-designed catalogues. Images in color are from 1986 to 1987, and images in black-and-white are from 1908 to 1909.

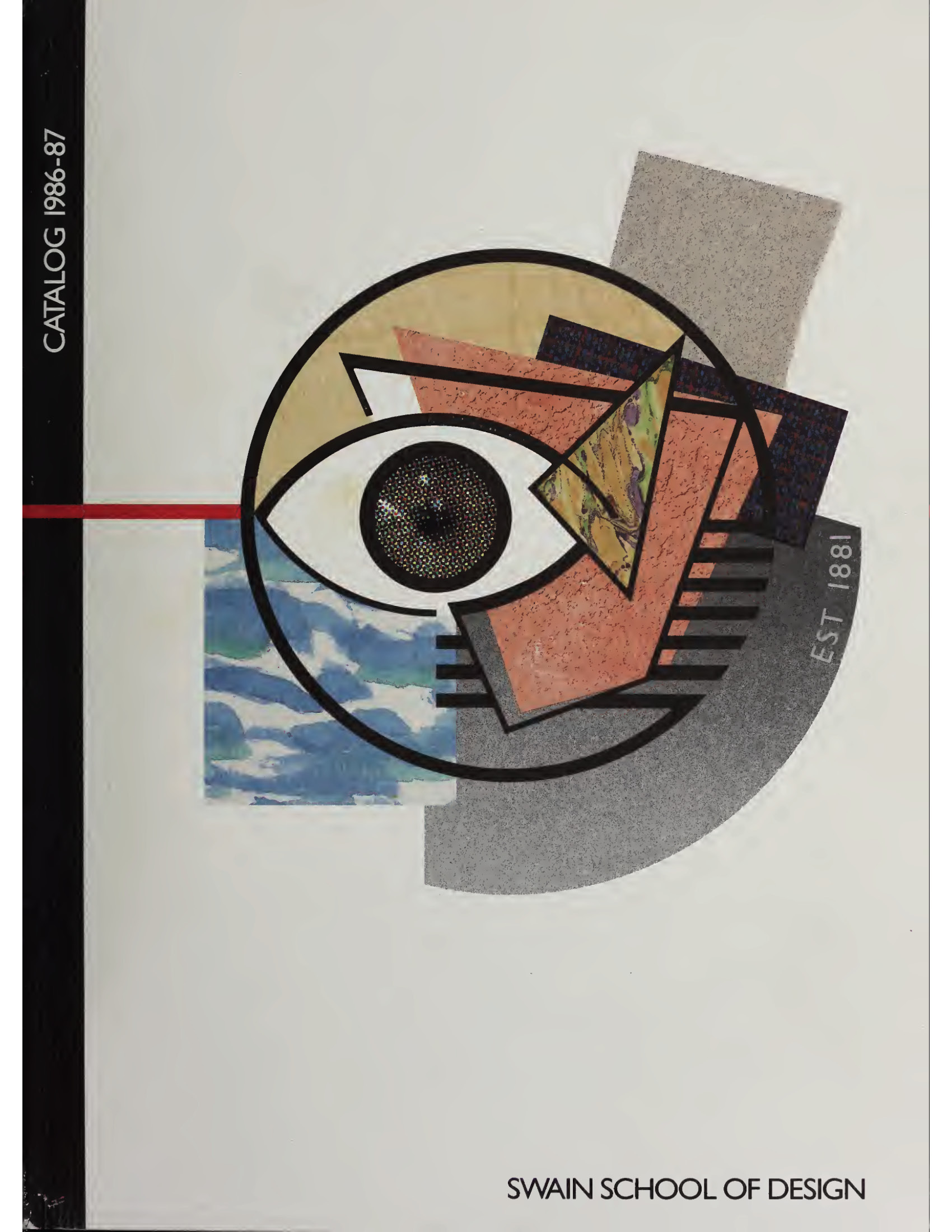
Cover from the 1986-87 catalogue.

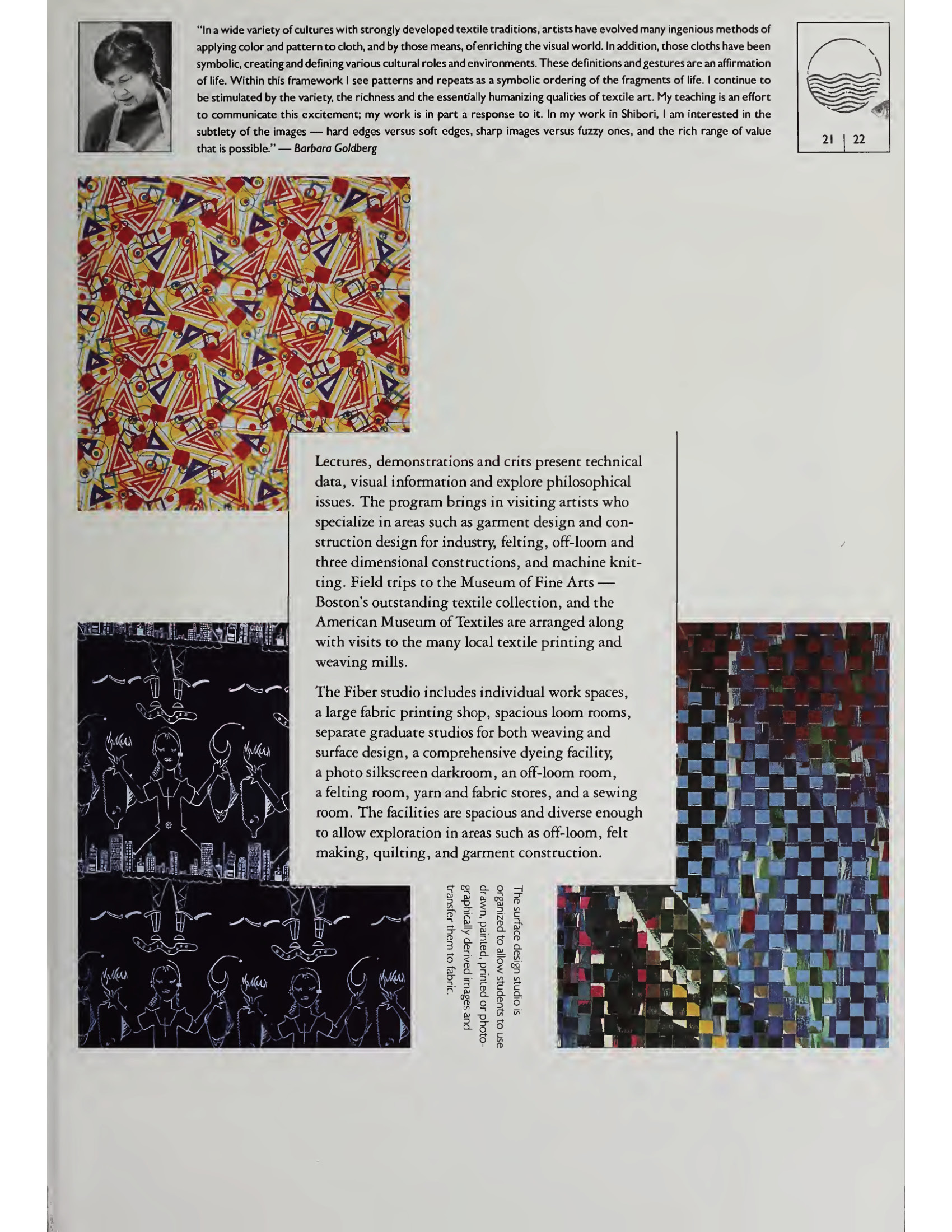
Fiber art from the 1986-87 catalogue.

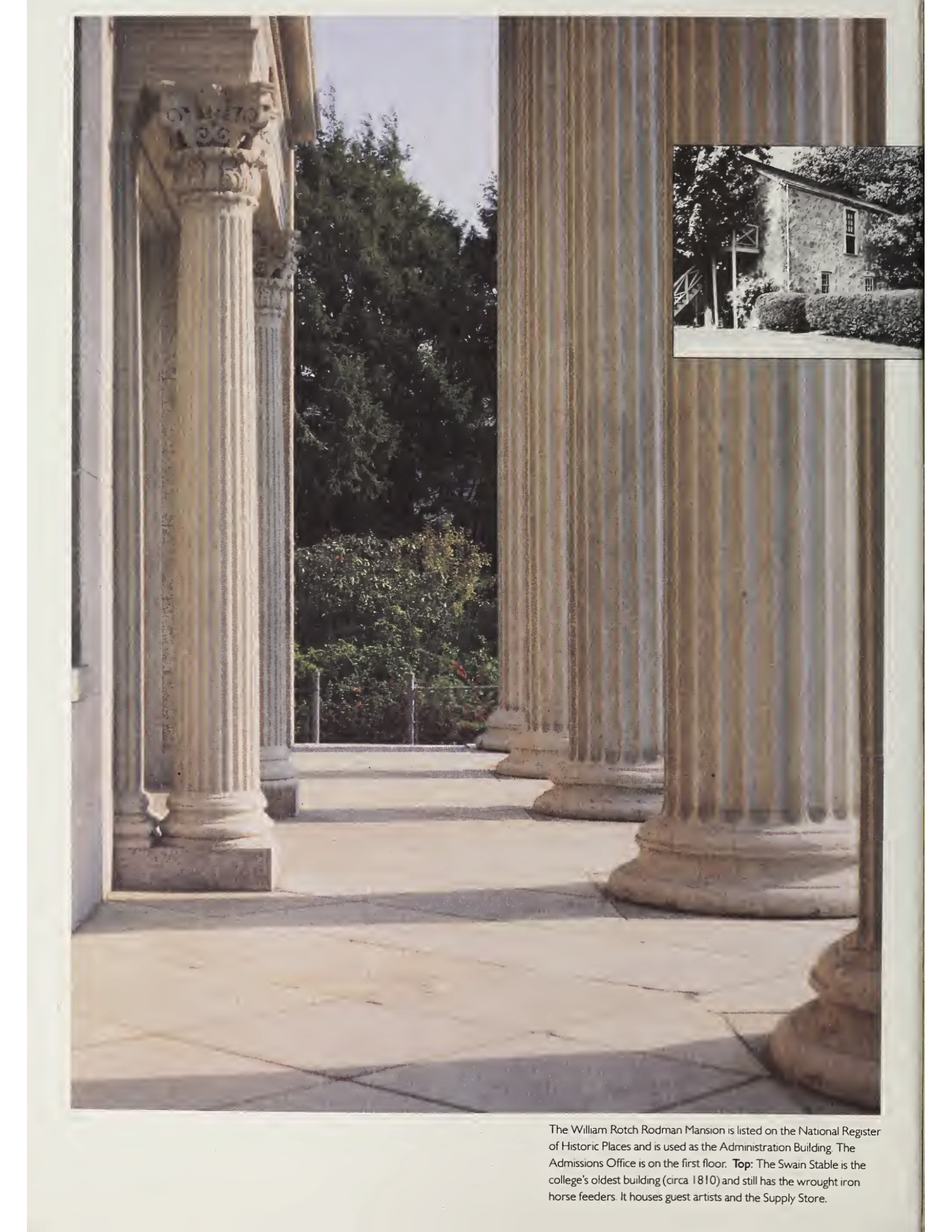
The Rodman mansion is on the National Register of Historic Places.
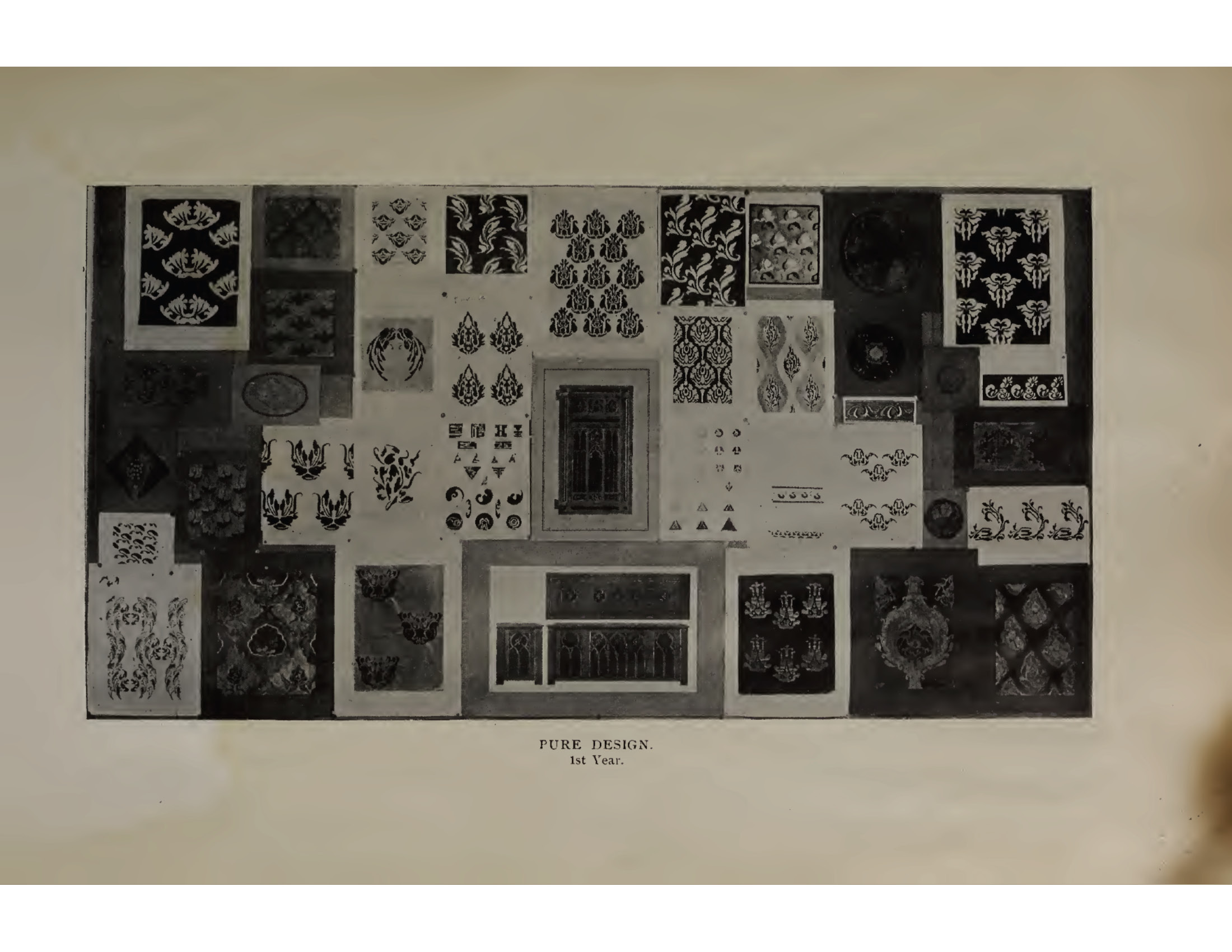
Year 1 — "Pure design" teaches the fundamentals and is a prerequisite before putting work in historic context.

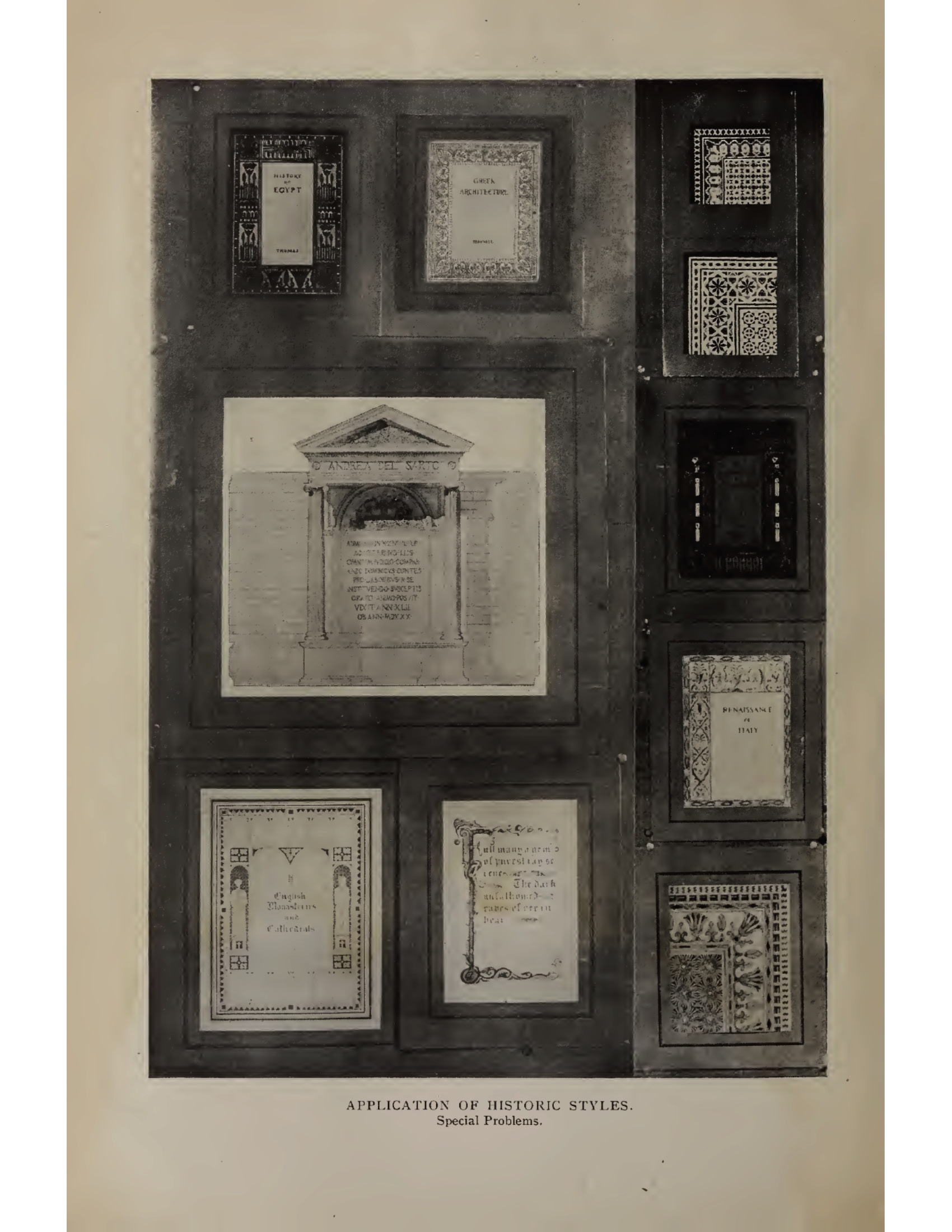
Year 2 — Historic "applied design" to several "special problems."

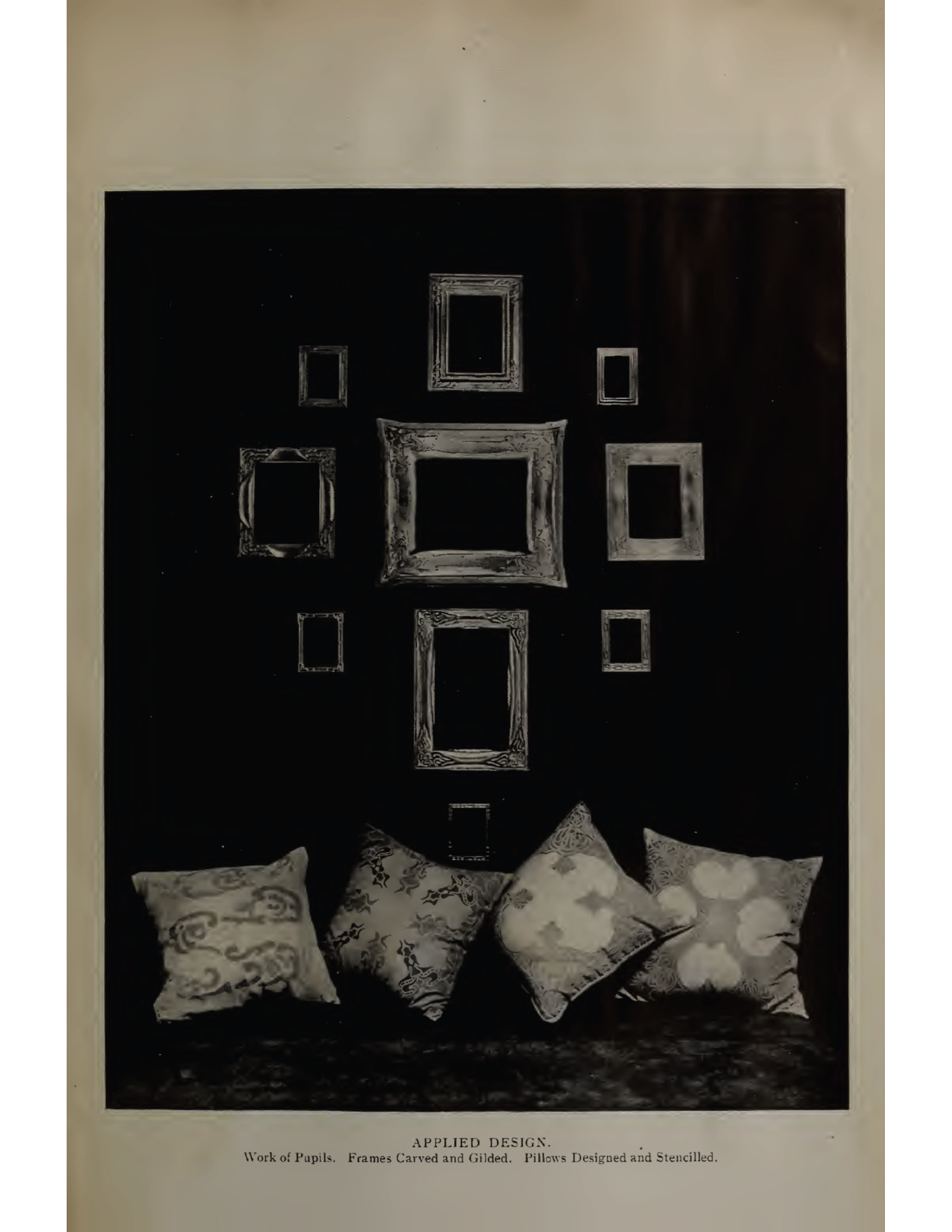
Year 2 — Historic "applied design" of carved, gilded frames and stenciled pillows.

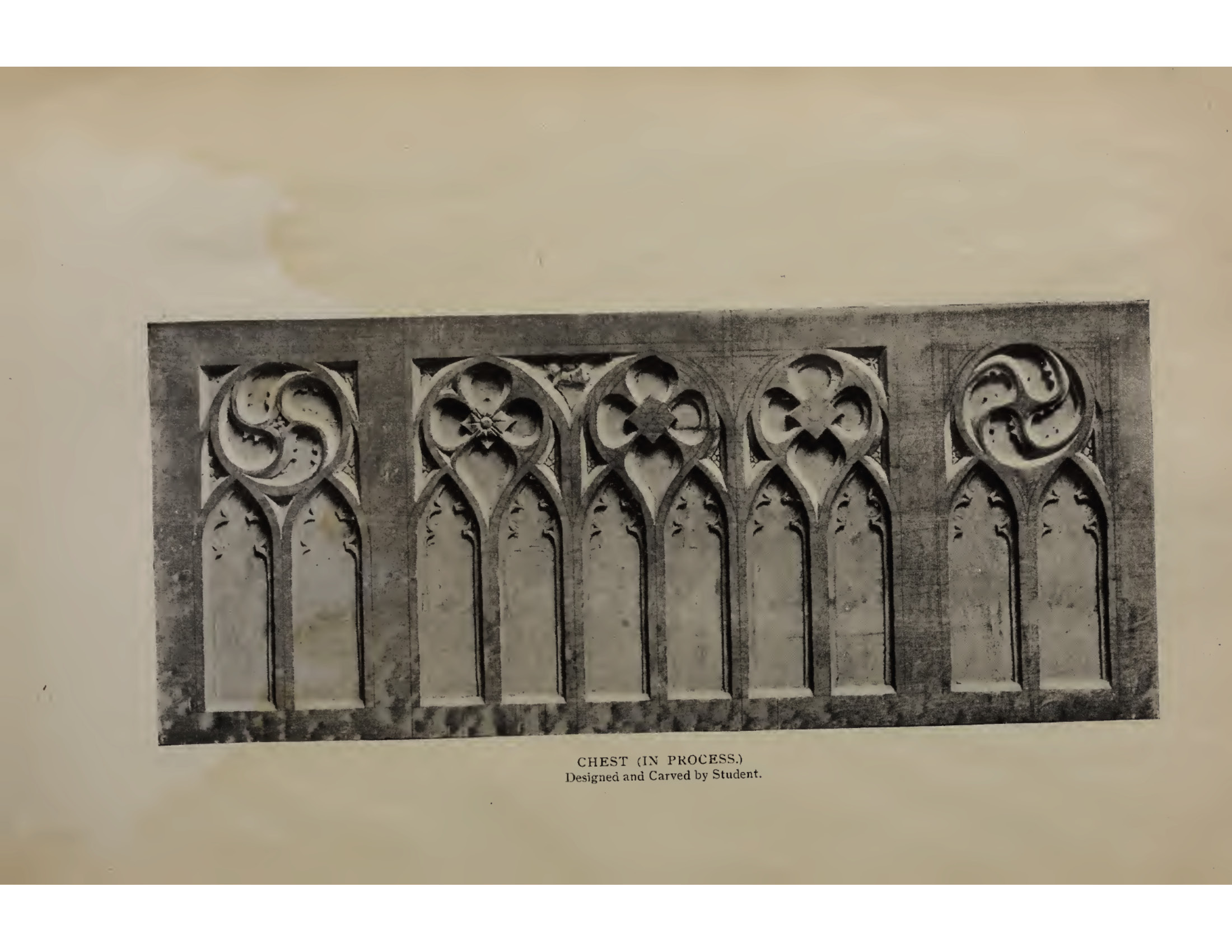
Year 2 — Historic "applied design" on hand-carved trunk (in process).

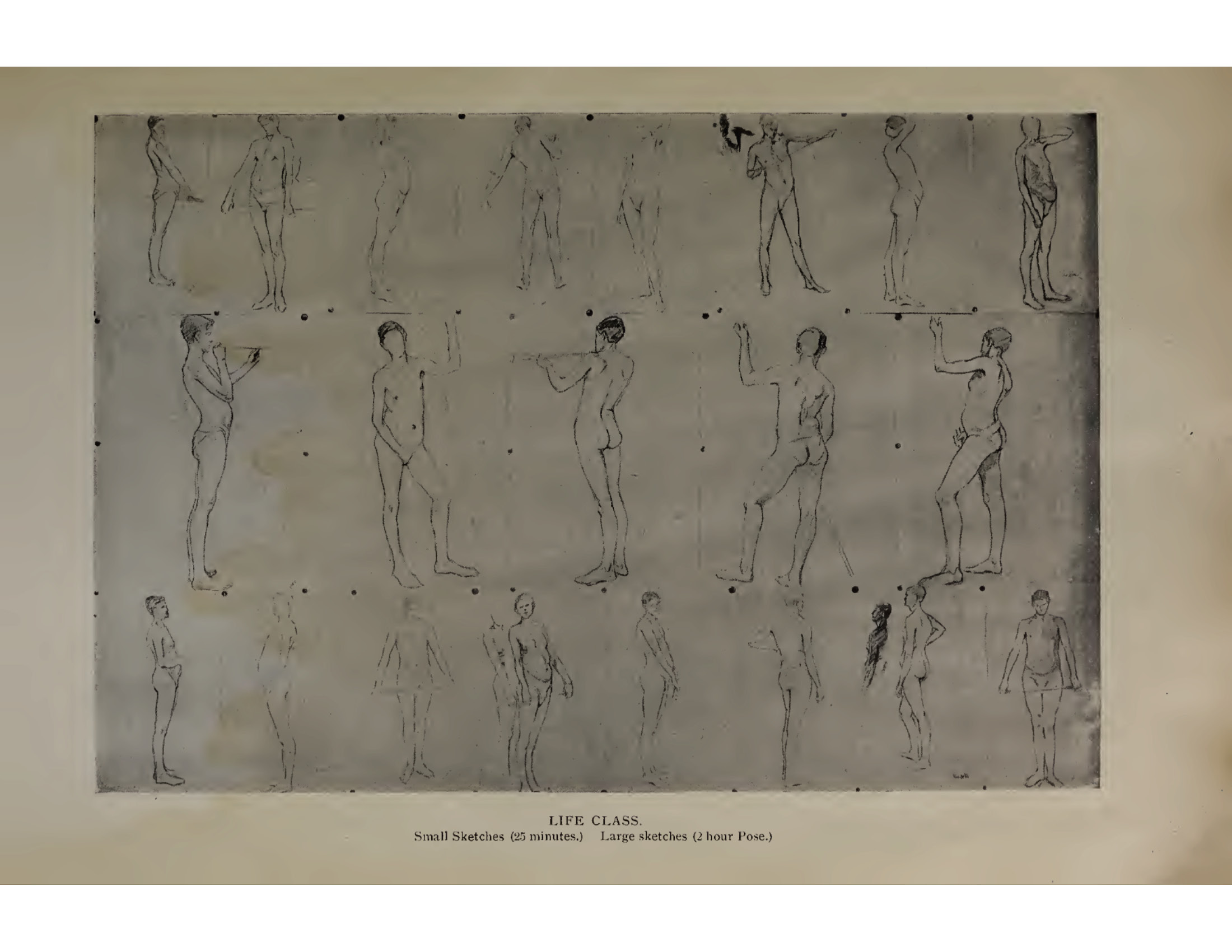
Year 2 — Historic "applied design" figurative sketches.

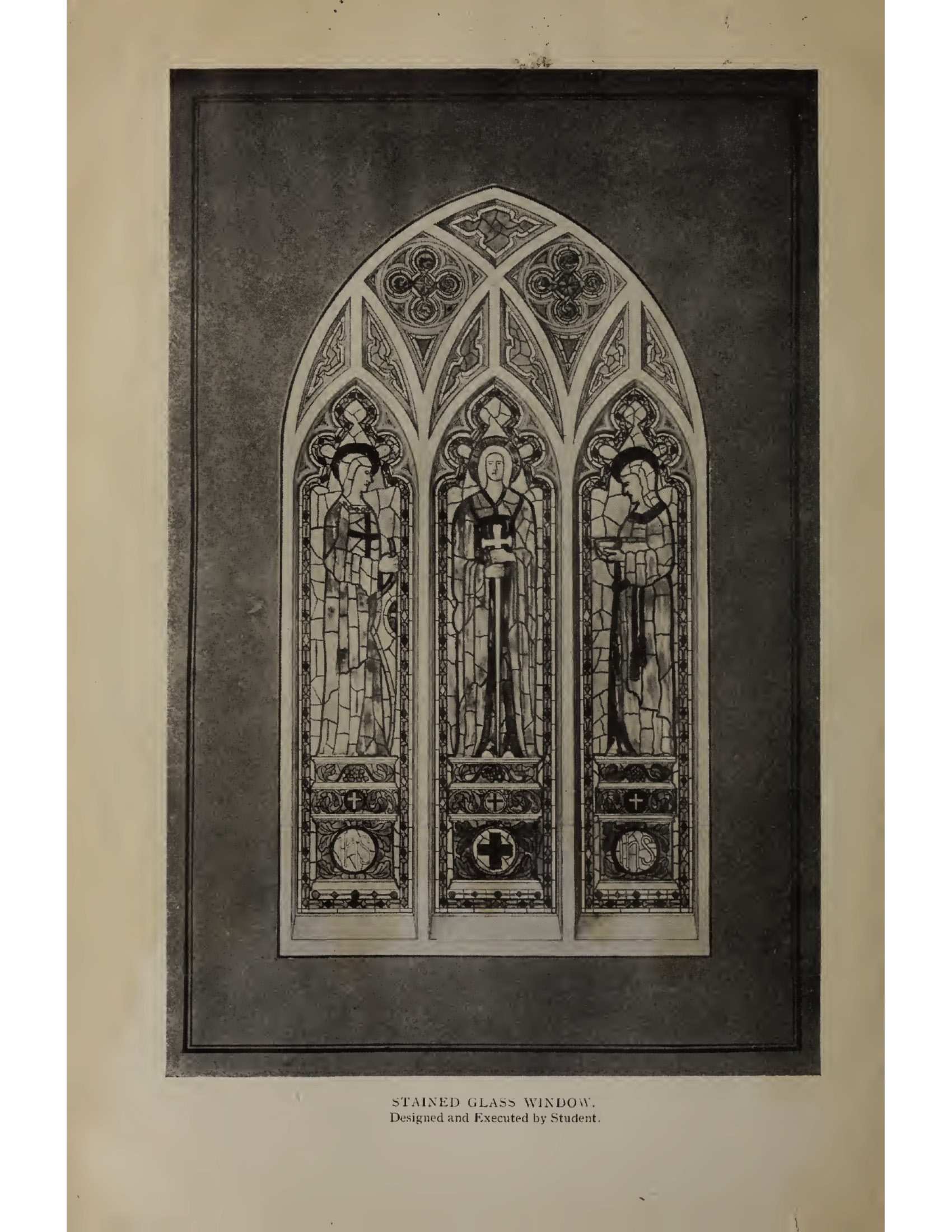
Year 2 — Historic "applied design" of stained glass.

== See also ==
- Catalogues through the Decades (Archive.org)
- Facebook Group—Swain School of Design (Facebook Group)
- News link—Rodman Mansion Tour (News link)
- Overview—Swain School of Design (Archive.org)
- Website—Alumni Gallery
- UMass Dartmouth—Swain School of Design
