= Oak Grove Cemetery (New Bedford, Massachusetts) =

Historic cemetery in Massachusetts, United States

- U.S. National Register of Historic Places
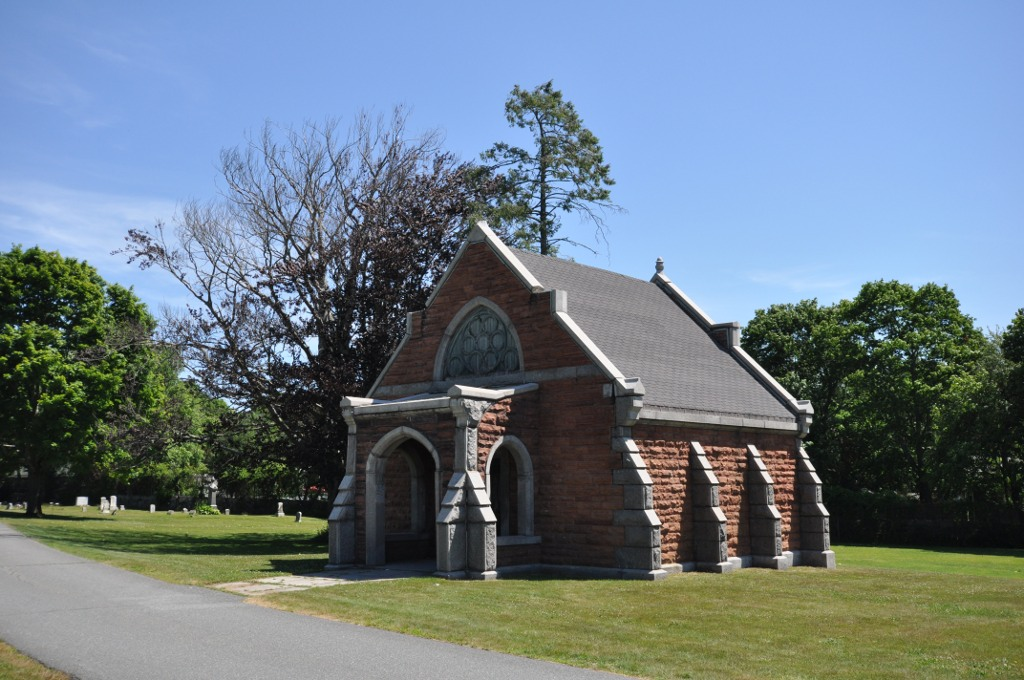

- Location within Massachusetts Location within the United States
- Location: Parker St., New Bedford, Massachusetts
- Coordinates: 41.6437°N 70.942°W
- Area: 31 acres (13 ha)
- Built: 1843 (relocated burials date to 1798)
- NRHP reference No.: 14000176
- Added to NRHP: April 28, 2014

The Oak Grove Cemetery is a historic cemetery on Parker Street in New Bedford, Massachusetts. It consists of two parcels, separated by Parker Street, northwest of the city's central business district. The older portion of the cemetery, that south of Parker Street, was established in 1843, while the northern section was acquired and developed between 1870 and 1896. Most of the cemetery is laid out in the then-fashionable rural cemetery style of winding lanes, although the northernmost section has a more open layout, made partly due to complaints about the cluttered nature of the rural cemetery style.

The cemetery was listed on the National Register of Historic Places in 2014.

== Notable burials ==
- William P. Brownell (1839–1915), Union soldier and Medal of Honor recipient
- Richard Albert Canfield (1855–1914), businessman and gambler
- William Harvey Carney (1840–1908), Union soldier and Medal of Honor recipient
- John Duffey (1836–1923), Union soldier and Medal of Honor recipient
- Thomas D. Eliot (1808–1870), US Congressman
- William Jackson (1818–1900), minister and abolitionist
- Harry Stovey (1856–1937), professional baseball player

== See also ==
- National Register of Historic Places listings in New Bedford, Massachusetts
