= Azorean Maritime Heritage Society =

The Azorean Maritime Heritage Society (AMHS) is a U.S. nonprofit organization whose mission is to promote Azorean culture and whaling heritage by raising awareness and pride within New England's Azorean-American community and recognizing the rich maritime heritage commonly shared for more than 150 years between New Bedford, Massachusetts and the Azores, nine islands in the North Atlantic Ocean about 1,360 km (850 mi) west of continental Portugal. The Society maintains three authentic Azorean whaleboats — Pico, Faial, and Bela Vista — which were built in the post-whaling era using traditional techniques and used for cultural, historical, and recreational events. Currently, there are only 63 Azorean whaleboats in the world; these are the only three in the United States.

First held in 2004 in New Bedford, the Azorean Maritime Heritage Society's International Azorean Whaleboat Regatta is a major regional event and attraction. It alternates every other year between New Bedford and the Azores and attracts spectators and wooden boat enthusiasts, civic leaders, and dignitaries from the U.S., Azores, and mainland Portugal. The Regatta week is packed with whaleboat rowing and sailing races, as well as cultural presentations, lectures, and dinners.

In 2017, the International Azorean Whaleboat Regatta week celebrated the Society's 20th Anniversary and the 20th birthday of the first Azorean whaleboat launched in America – the Bela Vista, as well as the opening of an exhibition at the New Bedford Whaling Museum by photographers Gemina Garland-Lewis and O. Louis Mazzatenta of a “then and now” picture of Azorean whaling and the men who were a part of this unique world, in Azorean Whalemen: A Photographic Retrospective. The New Bedford Whaling Museum and the Society have been unwavering partners since the Society's founding in 1997 and have worked together to promote Portuguese maritime history and culture in the community.

Throughout the year, AMHS participates in many local events, including the world's largest Portuguese Feast, Feast of the Blessed Sacrament, the Working Waterfront Festival, and regattas with local rowing clubs. They also hold an annual wine tasting, Sails of Portugal, and a scholarship dinner to raise funds for college-bound high school students.
