= Quequechan Club =

- U.S. National Register of Historic Places
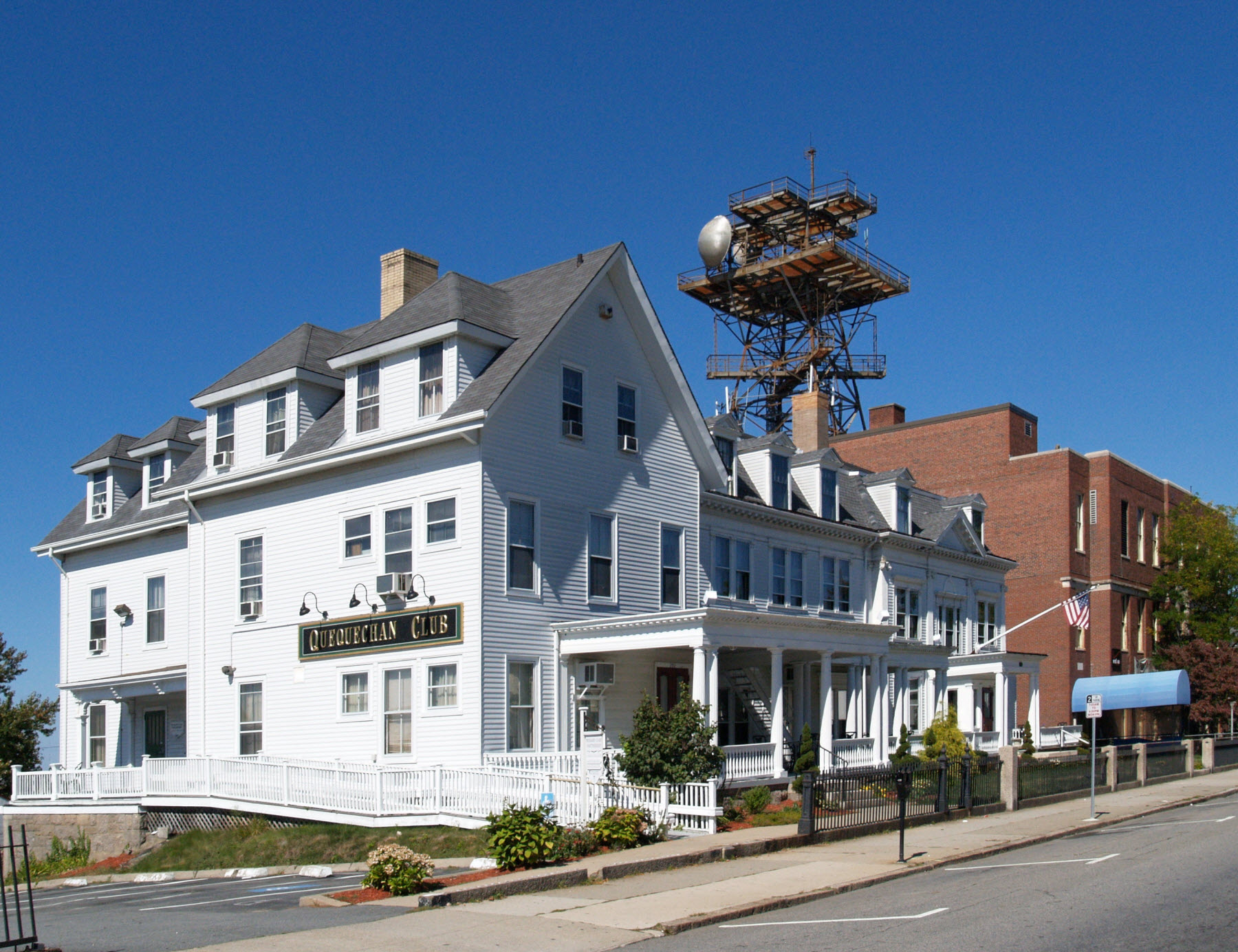

- Location within Massachusetts Location within the United States
- Location: Fall River, Massachusetts
- Coordinates: 41°42′21.4″N 71°9′18.1″W
- Built: 1861; 165 years ago
- Architect: N. C. Smith; Angell & Swift
- Architectural style: Colonial Revival
- MPS: Fall River MRA
- NRHP reference No.: 83000708
- Added to NRHP: February 16, 1983

The Quequechan Club is a historic building at 306 North Main Street in Fall River, Massachusetts, United States.

The building was built in 1861 and added to the National Register of Historic Places in 1983.

The Quequechan club was originally a gentlemen's club in the late 19th century that was run by all of the members. The bedrooms upstairs were used as a bed and breakfast. During the early 20th century the club turned more into a restaurant, and banquet hall for members. It was not until the 1970s that women were allowed to enter the dining room unescorted. The club is no longer member-operated and was owned by sole proprietor Dan Silva. It closed in 2012. The club has been reported to be haunted, and mediums and ghost hunters have visited the premises. Solid proof has yet to be found.

== See also ==
- National Register of Historic Places listings in Fall River, Massachusetts
