= Times and Olympia Buildings =

- U.S. National Register of Historic Places
- U.S. Historic district – Contributing property
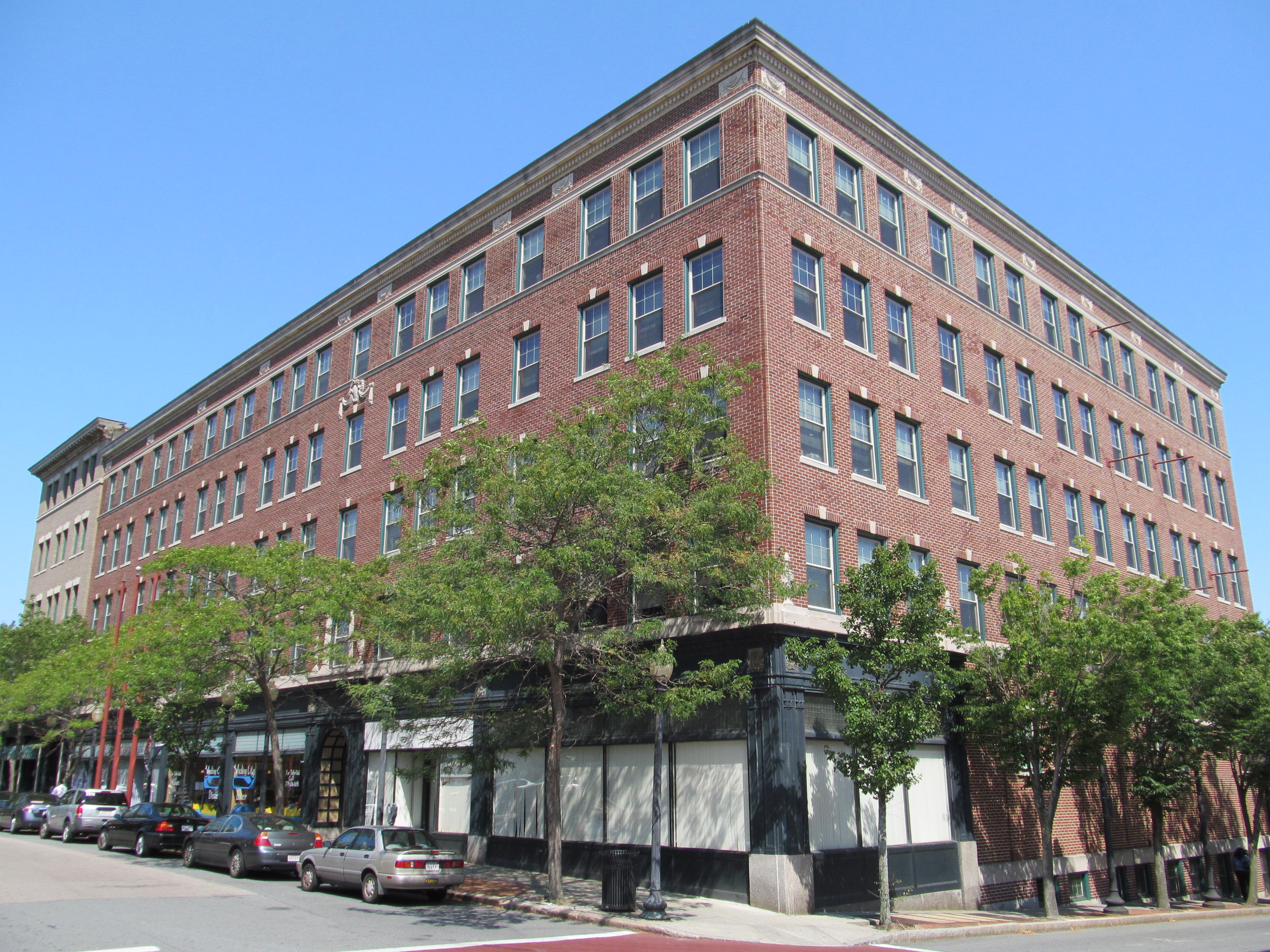
- Times and Olympia Buildings

- Location within Massachusetts Location within the United States
- Location: 908–912 and 880–898 Purchase Street, New Bedford, Massachusetts
- Coordinates: 41°38′11″N 70°55′36″W
- Built: 1897
- Architect: Nat. C. Smith; Mowll & Rand
- Architectural style: Colonial Revival
- Part of: Central New Bedford Historic District (ID80000430)
- NRHP reference No.: 83000725

Significant dates
- Added to NRHP: July 7, 1983
- Designated CP: April 24, 1980

The Times and Olympia Buildings are a pair of historic buildings in central New Bedford, Massachusetts. The Times Building, also known as the Slocum or Evans Building, stands at 908–912 Purchase Street, and was built in 1897 to a design by Nat. C. Smith. Originally a furniture store, it was home to the New Bedford Times until the 1950s. The Olympia Building stands next door; it was designed by Mowll & Rand of Boston and built in 1921. It is a four-story brick building, with shops on the ground floor and offices above.

The buildings were listed on the National Register of Historic Places in 1983.

== See also ==
- Union Baptist Church (New Bedford, Massachusetts), also designed by Smith and NRHP-listed

== See also ==
- National Register of Historic Places listings in New Bedford, Massachusetts
