= The Whaleman =

Public statue in New Bedford, Massachusetts, U.S.

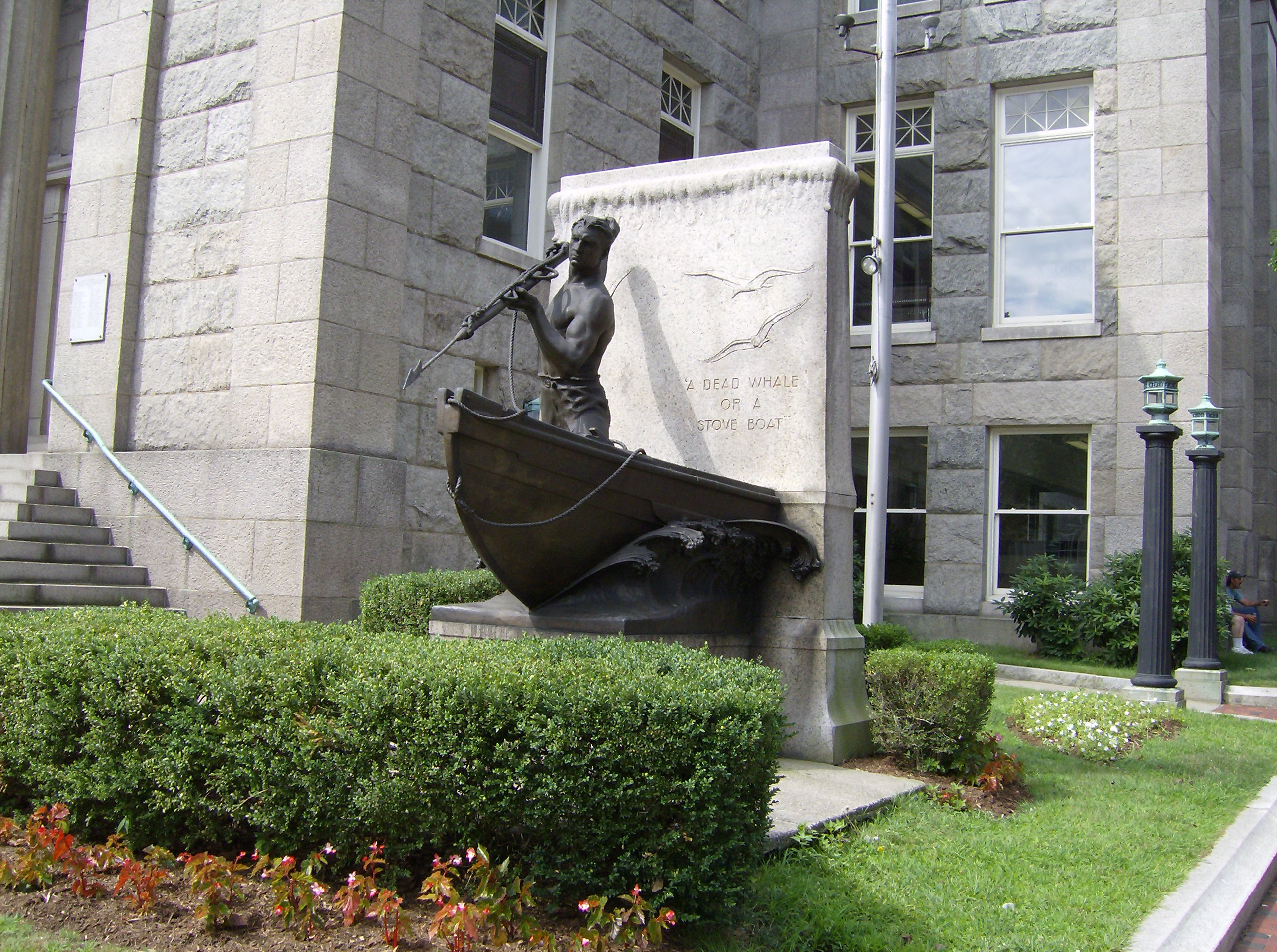
- The monument in 2006
- Interactive map of The Whaleman
- Location: New Bedford Free Public Library, New Bedford, Massachusetts, United States
- Coordinates: 41°38′6.5″N 70°55′38″W
- Designer: Bela Pratt (sculptor); Nathaniel Cannon Smith (architect)
- Type: Statue
- Material: Bronze (statue); Granite (base)
- Length: 7 ft 10 in (2.39 m)
- Width: 7 ft 6 in (2.29 m)
- Height: 11 ft (3.4 m)
- Beginning date: 1912
- Completion date: 1913
- Dedicated date: June 20, 1913
- Dedicated to: Whalers from New Bedford

The Whaleman is a public statue located in New Bedford, Massachusetts, United States. It was commissioned in 1912 by William W. Crapo, a former member of the United States House of Representatives, as a gift for the city, in recognition of its whaling industry. It was dedicated the following year in front of the New Bedford Free Public Library. The bronze statue was designed by sculptor Bela Pratt, while Nathaniel Cannon Smith, who had also designed the library, served as the monument's architect. Since its unveiling, the monument has been considered a symbol of the city, and its image has been widely reproduced.

== Design ==
The monument consists of a bronze sculpture and a granite base and wall. The sculpture, which emerges from the wall, depicts a shirtless man standing at the bow of a boat that is surrounded by ocean waves. The man holds a harpoon, positioned over his right shoulder, which he is aiming downwards, in front of the boat. Markings on the sculpture indicate the foundry that cast it ("The Gorham Co. Founder, Providence, RI.") and both its designer ("B.L. Pratt 1912"). The front of the wall features images of seagulls and the inscription "A Dead Whale or a Stove Boat", which is a quote from Captain Ahab of the novel Moby-Dick. On the rear is the following inscription:

IN HONOR OF THE WHALEMEN WHOSE / SKILL HARDIHOOD AND DARING BROUGHT / FAME AND FORTUNE TO NEW BEDFORD / AND MADE ITS NAME KNOWN IN EVERY / SEAPORT THE GLOBE / GIFT OF W.W. CRAPO / 1913

The rear of the wall also features a commemorative plaque that bears the inscription "New Bedford Port / LUCEM DIFFUNDO".

The sculpture has a height of 10 feet (3.0 meters), while the wall is 11 ft (3.4 m) tall. Additionally, the granite base has area dimensions of 7 ft 10 in (2.39 m) by 7 ft 6 in (2.29 m).

== History ==
=== Creation ===
The monument was the idea of William W. Crapo, a well-known resident of New Bedford and former member of the United States House of Representatives, who intended for it to be a gift from him to the city. On February 8, 1912, Crapo wrote a letter to Charles S. Ashley, New Bedford's mayor, requesting that preparations be made for the unveiling of a monument in recognition of the city's whaling industry. In the letter, he specified that he wished for the monument to be located in front of the city's public library and that he had already requested sculptor Bela Pratt to design a model. Ashley responded to Crapo later that month that he supported his plan. This was not the first time that Crapo had been involved in the historic preservation of the whaling industry in the city, as several years earlier in 1906 he had helped to established what would later be known as the New Bedford Whaling Museum.

Pratt was commissioned by Crapo in 1912, the same year that he began work on the sculpture. According to an ancestor of Crapo's, Pratt had been difficult to commission but was ultimately able to convince him to accept the project, for which he was paid $25,000 (equivalent to $834,000 in 2025). Richard Lewis McLachlan, a boatsteerer who was a New Bedford local, served as Pratt's model for the whaleman, posing in a whaleboat at the Old Dartmouth Historical Society. Crapo had reached out to a whaling agent to find a whaleman for Pratt to use as a model, with the first individual sent to him being a native of Cape Verde. However, he was rejected, as the monument's planners wanted to use a white person instead. The statue was cast in 1913 by the Gorham Manufacturing Company. (Note: In a 2013 article, The Standard-Times reported that records at the public library showed that casting was performed by Roman Bronze Works. However, the Smithsonian Institution Research Information System entry for this monument states that the casting for the sculpture was performed by the Gorham Manufacturing Company. In the entry, it is also noted that foundry marks present on the sculpture note "The Gorham Co." as the company that created the sculpture.) Meanwhile, Nathaniel Cannon Smith served as the architect for the project, designing the granite base and a drainage system for the boat. Smith had previously designed the library which the monument was to be installed in front of.

The monument was dedicated on June 20, 1913, in a ceremony that attracted several thousand spectators. The monument was unveiled by George Baker, a sea captain who was the oldest living whaling master in New Bedford. During the ceremony, Crapo gave an introductory address, while the monument was accepted on behalf of the city by Mayor Ashley. Other speakers at the event included Edmund Wood (the president of the Old Dartmouth Historical Society), the Reverend Charles S. Thurber, P. C. Headley Jr. (a representative for the local Board of Trade), and Otis S. Cook (a trustee for the library).

=== Later history ===
In 1987, the sculpture was cleaned via sandblasting. Several years later, in 1993, the monument was surveyed as part of the Save Outdoor Sculpture! program. In December 1998, the harpoon from the sculpture went missing, with a replacement installed the following year.

In September 2011, Mayor Scott W. Lang ordered that a wrought iron fence be erected around the monument. The fence, which was installed without the consultation of either the library's board of trustees or the city council, drew the ire of several councilors and historic preservationists. Per the mayor's office, the fence was erected at the same time that repairs had been made to the monument's base, which it was discovered were undermined. Lang later stated that the fence was added as a safety measure to prevent people from hurting themselves with the sculpture's harpoon and that the changes had been made with consultation of other city officials, including a historic planner. In January 2012, Mayor Jon Mitchell said that he did not believe that the fence interfered with the appearance of the monument and thought that it was necessary for safety. Despite this, the city council announced that they would be looking into possibly removing the fence. However, as of 2013, the fence was still present. In May of that year, the sculpture's harpoon was bent in an act of vandalism.

In June 2013, the city hosted a centennial ceremony for the monument at the library that included several elected officials, including Mayor Mitchell and Antonio Cabral of the Massachusetts House of Representatives, and descendants of both Crapo and Pratt.

In 2024, the harpoon broke off of the sculpture, prompting plans for a largescale restoration of the monument. This occurred the following year, with Daedalus Conservation, Inc. reattaching the harpoon and applying an acrylic coat to the sculpture to hinder corrosion.

== Legacy and historical analysis ==
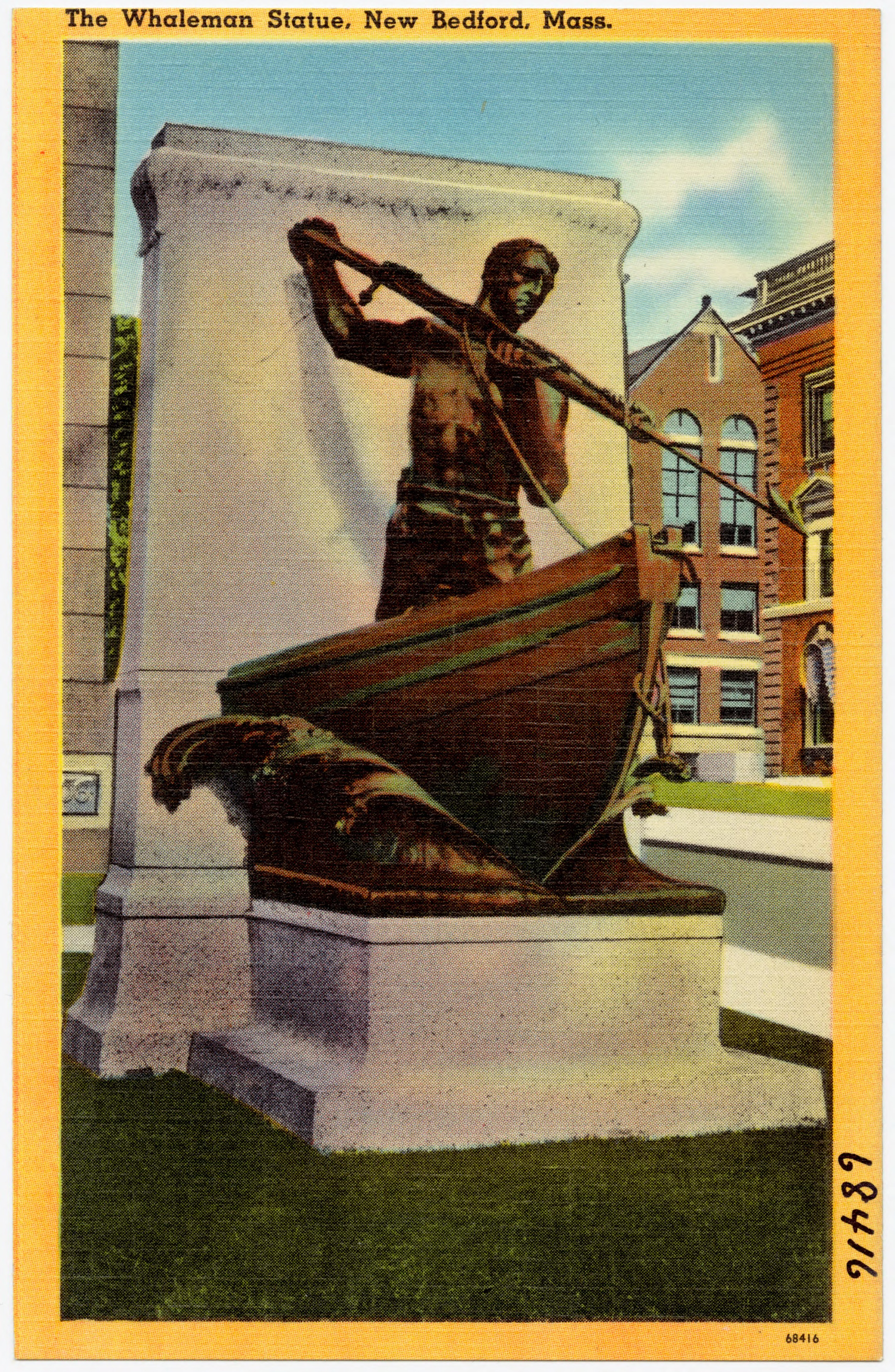
A postcard of the monument, c. 1930–1945

Since its erection, the monument has become a widely known emblem of the city of New Bedford, with The Standard-Times reporting in 2013 that the statue was "a worldwide symbol of the city". This sentiment was echoed by local historian Peggi Medeiros, who has called the statue "probably the greatest gift the city has ever been given". The image of the monument has been widely reproduced in souvenirs, including Christmas ornaments and postcards.

Discussing the historical context for the monument, Janice Hodson, the curator for art at the New Bedford Free Public Library, said in 2013 that it was "a paean to a romanticized past". Per Hodson, the statue was dedicated during a time when New Bedford's economy was in transition from one reliant on whaling to one more reliant on the textile industry, which had supplanted whaling during the latter half of the 19th century to be the dominant industry in the city. In a 2013 article celebrating the centennial of the monument, Matt Camara of The Standard-Times stated, "The statue has drawn fire over the years for everything from how the man depicted holds his harpoon to its portrayal of a white whaler when many whalers were men of color." Similar controversy was noted by Auditi Guha in the newspaper several months prior. In a 2023 book, academic Jamie L. Jones noted that the portrayal of the whaler as a white person was a conscientious decision by the monument's planners, as many of the harpooners during the time in New Bedford would have been Portuguese, while the harpooners featured in Moby-Dick, which was often cited during the development of the monument, were either black or indigenous.

== See also ==
- New Bedford Whaling National Historical Park

== Sources ==
- Anderson, Charis (January 30, 2012). "New fence around Whaleman statue could get harpooned". The Standard-Times. Gannett. ISSN 0745-3574. OCLC 22392728. Archived from the original on January 31, 2026.
- Camara, Matt (June 21, 2013). "New Bedford celebrates 100th anniversary of 'The Whaleman'". The Standard-Times. Gannett. ISSN 0745-3574. OCLC 22392728. Archived from the original on July 6, 2022.
- Gallerani, Kathryn (August 14, 2025). "'Whaleman' statue gets a glow-up. Check out the newly restored New Bedford landmark". The Standard-Times. Gannett. ISSN 0745-3574. OCLC 22392728. Archived from the original on August 14, 2025.
- Gifford, Daniel (2020). The Last Voyage of the Whaling Bark Progress: New Bedford, Chicago and the Twilight of an Industry. Jefferson, North Carolina: McFarland & Company. ISBN 978-1-4766-4007-5. LCCN 2020018369. OCLC 1243563597.
- Guha, Auditi (March 24, 2013a). "'The Whaleman' to celebrate 100th birthday in June". The Standard-Times. Gannett. ISSN 0745-3574. OCLC 22392728. Archived from the original on January 31, 2026.
- Guha, Auditi (March 24, 2013b). "Additions to iconic statue remain a controversy". The Standard-Times. Gannett. ISSN 0745-3574. OCLC 22392728. Archived from the original on January 31, 2026.
- Jones, Jamie L. (2023). Rendered Obsolete: Energy Culture and the Afterlife of US Whaling. Chapel Hill, North Carolina: University of North Carolina Press. ISBN 978-1-4696-7483-4. LCCN 2023010440. OCLC 1393305593.
- Pereira, Peter (August 14, 2025). "Iconic 'Whaleman' statue restored to original condition in New Bedford". The Standard-Times. Gannett. ISSN 0745-3574. OCLC 22392728. Archived from the original on August 15, 2025.
- The Presentation of the Whaleman Statue to the City of New Bedford by William W. Crapo and the Exercises at the Dedication, June Twentieth, Nineteen Hundred and Thirteen. Old Dartmouth Historical Sketches, No. 38. New Bedford, Massachusetts: E. Anthony & Sons, Inc. 1913. OCLC 902996876.
- Rios, Simón (May 17, 2013). "Whaleman's statue harpoon is bent — again". The Standard-Times. Gannett. ISSN 0745-3574. OCLC 22392728. Archived from the original on January 31, 2026.
- Salmond, John A. (2002). The General Textile Strike of 1934: From Maine to Alabama. Columbia, Missouri: University of Missouri Press. ISBN 978-0-8262-6342-1. LCCN 2002024567. OCLC 56424876.
- "The Whaleman Statue, (sculpture)". Smithsonian Institution Research Information System. Archived from the original on January 31, 2026.
