= KOBO (whale) =

Blue whale killed by a tanker in 1998

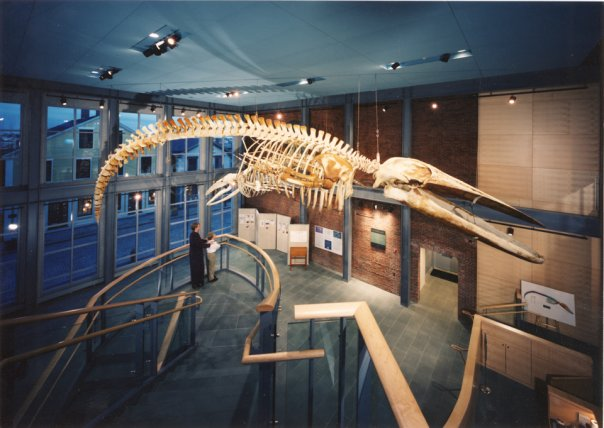
- KOBO hanging in the Jacobs Family Gallery at the New Bedford Whaling Museum.
- Species: Blue whale (Balaenoptera musculus)
- Sex: Male
- Born: c. 1992–1994
- Died: March 1998 (aged 4–6)
- Weight: 40 short tons (36 t)
- Height: 66 ft (20 m)

KOBO (King of the Blue Ocean) is the skeleton of a 66-foot-long (20 m) juvenile blue whale on display at the New Bedford Whaling Museum in New Bedford, Massachusetts. The whale was accidentally struck and killed by a tanker and brought ashore in Rhode Island in March 1998. It was named by New Bedford sixth-grade student Katie Hallett and put on display in 2000. It shares the gallery with three other whale skeletons: a 37-foot (11 m) male humpback named Quasimodo, a 49-foot (15 m) female North Atlantic right whale named Reyna who was pregnant at the time of her death, and Reyna's female fetus.

== Discovery and necropsy ==
KOBO was found on March 3, 1998 when the crew of a pilot boat in Narragansett Bay, Rhode Island spotted a dead whale draped across the bulbous bow of the 486-foot (148 m) tanker Botany Triumph. The tanker's crew appeared unaware that they had struck a whale, and the tanker reversed thrust to remove it from the bow. Several days later, scientists identified it as a juvenile male blue whale between 4 and 6 years of age. This was an extremely rare find, as there are only an estimated 500 blue whales in the North Atlantic, and there had not been a recorded stranding of a blue whale on the East Coast since 1891.

After identification, the Coast Guard towed the carcass to Second Beach near Sachuest Point National Wildlife Refuge in Middletown, Rhode Island. There, a necropsy was performed, and the whale was dissected. Parts of the whale were donated to scientific institutions around the world for research on genetics, toxicology, vision, hearing, respiration, and other subjects. The necropsy found that the whale's jaw was broken and deeply cut. The whale was also bruised around its midsection, but had been relatively healthy prior to its injuries. Researchers concluded that the whale had been first struck by a propeller, possibly belonging to a different ship, and then was killed when the Botany Triumph collided with it. The exact location and date of its death is uncertain, but it was estimated that the whale was struck off the southeast coast of Nova Scotia around March 1, 1998 and was stuck on the ship's bow until several days later, when it was discovered in Narragansett Bay.

== Skeleton preparation ==
After dissection, the National Marine Fisheries Service entrusted the whale to the New Bedford Whaling Museum, which agreed to display the entire skeleton free of charge to the public in its lobby gallery. The carcass was first brought to the New Bedford landfill, where volunteers and scientists removed the flesh from the bones. Sections of carcass were then placed in 22 specially-built cages and submerged for five months in New Bedford harbor so that marine life could clean the bones naturally. Finally, the bones were brought to the museum courtyard for drying and sun-bleaching. The 18-foot (5.5 m) skull and lower jaw alone weighed 1.5 tons and required a special shelter and workshop. It was also discovered that some of the vertebrae were badly damaged in the collision. The museum borrowed sample vertebrae from Harvard University and made fiberglass casts that were then painted to replicate the appearance of the original bones.

Blue whale bones are extremely oily, and while the skeleton was being prepared, the oil caused the bones to turn yellow and smell unpleasant. To account for this, the bones were soaked in a biodegradable leather-curing solution. Nevertheless, the skeleton has continued leaking oil, even years after the whale's death. The museum has responded by setting up tubing which collects the oil and deposits it in a beaker, where visitors can view it and learn about whale oil.

== Naming ==
In 2000, the New Bedford Whaling Museum held a children's essay contest to name the skeleton. They received about 1,200 entries, and the winner was New Bedford sixth-grader Katie Hallet, who chose the name KOBO, short for King of the Blue Ocean. The name was announced on June 5, 2000.

== Display ==
In July 2000, KOBO was put on display in the New Bedford Whaling Museum's entrance gallery, the Jacobs Family Gallery. It shares the gallery space with three other whale skeletons: a 37-foot (11 m) male humpback named Quasimodo, a 49-foot (15 m) female North Atlantic right whale named Reyna who was 10 months pregnant at the time of her death, and Reyna's female fetus. The museum uses the skeletons to teach visitors about whale conservation and the history of whaling in the United States.

== See also ==
- List of individual cetaceans
