= Union Baptist Church (New Bedford, Massachusetts) =

Historic church in Massachusetts, United States

- U.S. National Register of Historic Places
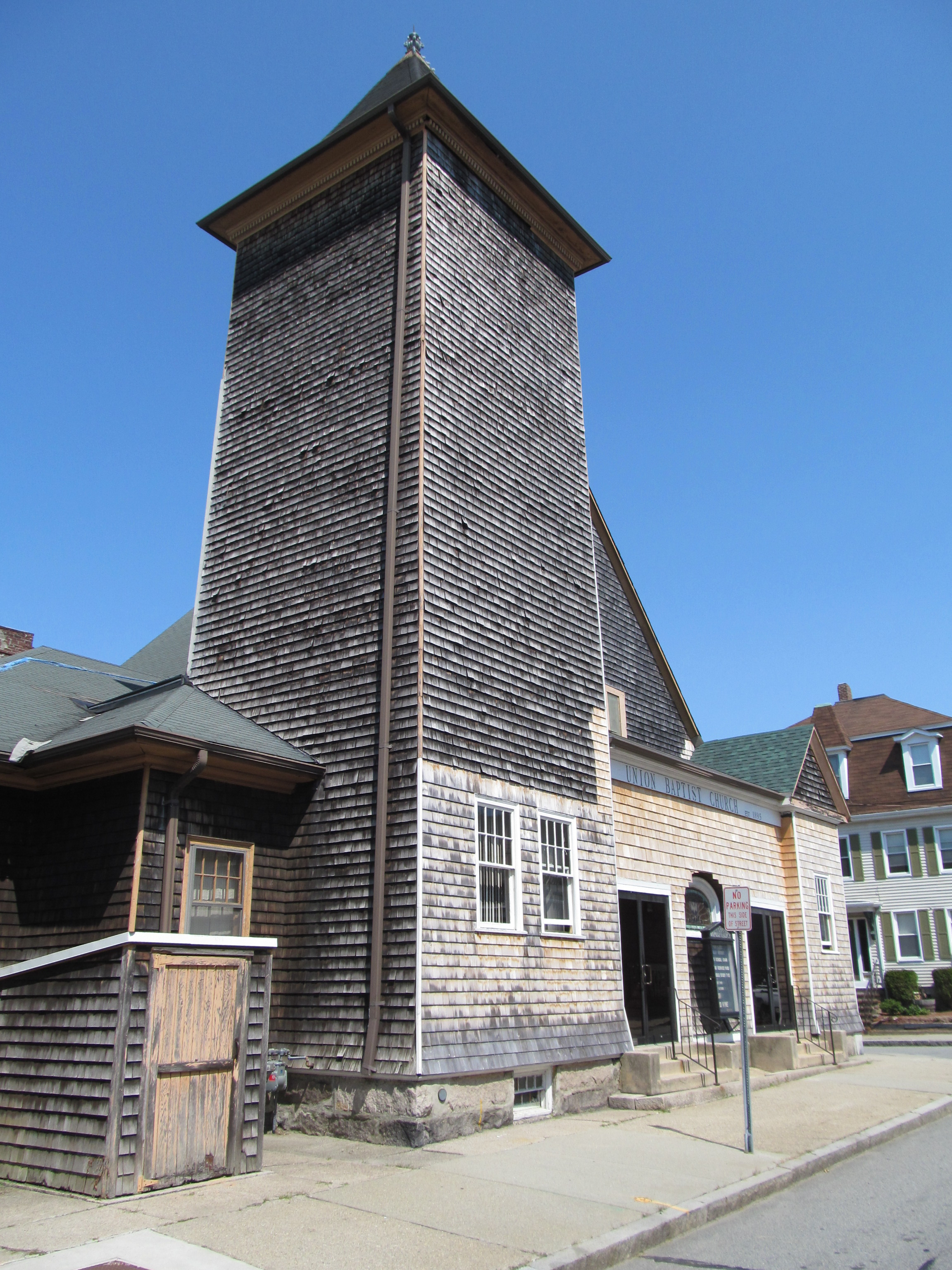
- Union Baptist Church

- Location within Massachusetts Location within the United States
- Location: 109 Court St., New Bedford, Massachusetts
- Coordinates: 41.63423°N 70.93473°W
- Area: less than one acre
- Built: 1899
- Architect: Smith, Nathaniel Cannon
- Architectural style: Shingle Style
- NRHP reference No.: 08000532
- Added to NRHP: June 16, 2008

Union Baptist Church is a historic church at 109 Court Street in New Bedford, Massachusetts, USA. It was built in 1899 to a design by Nathaniel Cannon Smith in Shingle Style architecture. The congregation was founded in 1895 by a merger of two African American congregations that had split in 1859 into the Second Baptist Church and Salem Baptist Church, the latter under the leadership of Rev. William Jackson. The Second Baptist Church was a leading New Bedford institution associated with the assistance of fugitive slaves in the pre-Civil War period.

The building was listed on the National Register of Historic Places in 2008.

== See also ==
- Times and Olympia Buildings, also designed by Smith in New Bedford and NRHP-listed.
- National Register of Historic Places listings in New Bedford, Massachusetts
