= Ron Kowalke =

Galactic Sculpture #2 by Ron Kowalke, 1981, Honolulu Museum of Art

Ron Leory Kowalke (born 1936, died February 26, 2021) was an American painter, printmaker, sculptor, and art educator born in Chicago. He attended the Art Institute of Chicago and the University of Chicago, but earned his BA from Rockford University in 1959. He received an MFA from Cranbrook Academy of Art in 1960. He taught at Northern Illinois University and the Swain School of Design before joining the faculty of the University of Hawaii. He taught in Hawaii from 1969 until his retirement as a professor emeritus in 2000.

His works often explored extreme linear perspective and multiple framings, as in Galactic Sculpture #2. The Auckland Art Gallery, the Boston Public Library, the Fogg Museum, the Hawaii State Art Museum, the Hessel Museum of Art, the Honolulu Museum of Art, the Library of Congress, the Metropolitan Museum of Art, the Museum of Modern Art (New York), and the Yale University Art Gallery are among the public collections holding work by Ron Kowalke.
