= John Duffey (soldier) =

- Born: March 17, 1836; New Bedford, Massachusetts
- Died: August 21, 1923 (aged 87); New Bedford, Massachusetts
- Burial place: Oak Grove Cemetery, New Bedford, Massachusetts
- Military career
- Allegiance: United States of America
- Branch: United States Army
- Service years: 1863 - 1865
- Rank: Private
- Units: Company B, 4th Massachusetts Volunteer Cavalry Regiment
- Awards: Medal of Honor

John Duffey (March 17, 1836 – August 21, 1923) was an American soldier who fought in the American Civil War. Duffey received the country's highest award for bravery during combat, the Medal of Honor, for his action at Ashepoo River in South Carolina on 24 May 1864. He was honored with the award on 21 January 1897.

== Biography ==
Duffey was born in New Bedford, Massachusetts on 17 March 1836. He joined the Army from New Bedford in December 1863 and mustered out with his regiment in November 1865. Duffey died on 21 August 1923, and his remains are interred at Oak Grove Cemetery in New Bedford.

== Medal of Honor citation ==
Volunteered as a member of a boatcrew which went to the rescue of a large number of Union soldiers on board the stranded steamer Boston, and with great gallantry assisted in conveying them to shore, being exposed during the entire time to a heavy fire from a Confederate battery.

== See also ==
- List of American Civil War Medal of Honor recipients: A–F
