= William P. Brownell =

- Born: July 12, 1839
- Died: April 26, 1915 (aged 75)
- Burial place: Oak Grove Cemetery
- Military career
- Allegiance: United States of America
- Branch: United States Navy
- Rank: Coxswain
- Unit: (New York (state))
- Conflicts: Battle of Grand Gulf; Siege of Vicksburg
- Awards: Medal of Honor

Coxswain William P. Brownell (July 12, 1839 – April 26, 1915) was an American soldier who fought in the American Civil War. Brownell received the country's highest award for bravery during combat, the Medal of Honor, for his action aboard the USS Benton during the Battle of Grand Gulf on 2 May 1863 and the Siege of Vicksburg at New Bern on 22 May 1863. He was honored with the award on 16 April 1864.

== Medal of Honor citation ==
Served as coxswain on board the U.S.S. Benton during the attack on Great Gulf Bay, 2 May 1863, and Vicksburg, 22 May 1863. Carrying out his duties with coolness and courage, Brownell served gallantly against the enemy as captain of a 9-inch gun in the attacks on Great Gulf and Vicksburg and as a member of the Battery Benton before Vicksburg.

== See also ==
- List of American Civil War Medal of Honor recipients: A–F
