= William W. Crapo =

American politician (1830–1926)

William Wallace Crapo
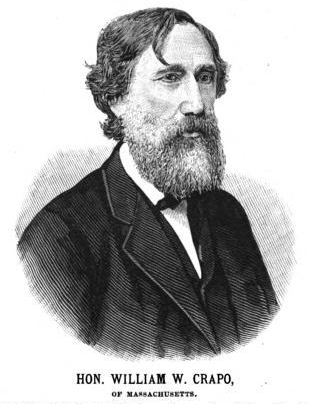

Member of the U.S. House of Representatives from Massachusetts's 1st district
- In office November 2, 1875 – March 3, 1883
- Preceded by: James Buffinton
- Succeeded by: Robert T. Davis

Personal details
- Born: May 16, 1830 Dartmouth, Massachusetts, U.S.
- Died: February 28, 1926 (aged 95) New Bedford, Massachusetts, U.S.
- Party: Republican
- Education: Yale University; Dane Law School
- Profession: Attorney

William Wallace Crapo (May 16, 1830 – February 28, 1926) was a member of the United States House of Representatives from Massachusetts. He was elected to fill the vacancy caused by the death of James Buffinton. He served slightly more than three terms in congress from November 2, 1875 to March 3, 1883

Born in Dartmouth, Massachusetts, died in New Bedford, Massachusetts. Crapo is interred in the Rural Cemetery. He was a prominent attorney in New Bedford. Among his clients was Hetty Green.

William Wallace Crapo was a brother of the Alpha Delta Phi fraternity in his undergraduate years at Yale University. He graduated in 1852 and was a member of Skull and Bones. On April 15, 1851, Crapo visited Brown University, on which date he is credited with initiating 17 members of the provisional chapter there, re-activating the ten-years-dormant Brunonian Chapter.

In 1903, Crapo (pronounced cray-poe) was a founding member and first president of the Old Dartmouth Historical Society, governing body of the New Bedford Whaling Museum.

== Personal life ==
Crapo was the son of Governor of Michigan Henry H. Crapo (1804–1869), who also served as the mayor of Flint, Michigan and in the Michigan State Senate. His mother, Mary Ann (Slocum) Crapo (1805–1875), was a descendant of William Hutchinson (Rhode Island judge) and his wife Anne Hutchinson, daughter of Francis Marbury. His second cousin, three times removed is Mike Crapo, who served as a United States representative from Idaho 1993-1999 and has served as a United States senator from Idaho since 1999. His nephew was William C. Durant, co-founder of General Motors.

Crapo married Sarah Ann Davis Tappan (October 6, 1831 in Newburyport, MA-December 13, 1893 in New Bedford, MA) on January 20, 1857 in New Bedford. They had four children:

- Henry Howland Crapo II (January 5, 1862 in New Bedford, MA-November 26, 1951 in Leesburg, FL)
- George Tappan Crapo (March 16, 1864 in New Bedford, MA-September 12, 1865 in New Bedford, MA)
- Stanford Tappan Crapo (June 13, 1865 in New Bedford, MA-January 26, 1939 in Tryon, NC); married Emma Caroline Morley (January 6, 1872 in Fort Scott, KS-November 27, 1937 in Detroit, MI) on October 10, 1894 in Painesville, OH
  - William Wallace Crapo II (1895–1991)
  - Catherine Tappan Crapo (1897–1977); married Capt. John Morgan Bullard, US Army (1890–1965)
    - Dr. John Crapo Bullard (1921–2002); married Katherine G. Kilburn (1922–2005)
      - John Kilburn Bullard (1947-; served as Mayor of New Bedford, Massachusetts from 1986 to 1992
    - Sarah Bullard (1924–1942)
  - Mary Morley Crapo (1912–2003); married 1st Donald Frizell Hyde (1909–1966); married 2nd David Eccles, 1st Viscount Eccles
    - Anne Howland Hyde (1941–1941)
- Anna Almy Crapo (November 20, 1866 in New Bedford, MA-April 27, 1867 in New Bedford, MA)

== See also ==
- The Whaleman - A monument in New Bedford commissioned by Crapo

U.S. House of Representatives
| Preceded by James Buffinton | Member of the U.S. House of Representatives from Massachusetts's 1st congressional district November 2, 1875 – March 3, 1883 | Succeeded by Robert T. Davis |
