= New Bedford Whaling Museum =

Museum in New Bedford, MA

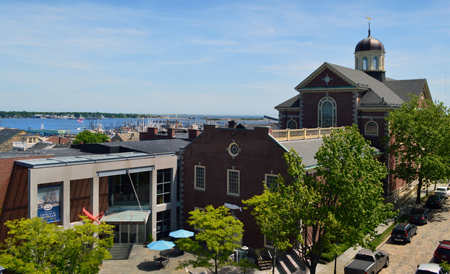
- New Bedford Whaling Museum and New Bedford Harbor

- Location within Massachusetts Location within the United States
- Established: 1903
- Location: 18 Johnny Cake Hill, New Bedford, Massachusetts
- Coordinates: 41.63530°N 70.92318°W
- Collection size: 750,000 items
- President: Amanda D. McMullen
- Website: www.whalingmuseum.org

The New Bedford Whaling Museum is a museum in New Bedford, Massachusetts, United States that focuses on the history, science, art, and culture of the international whaling industry, and the colonial region of Old Dartmouth (now the city of New Bedford and towns of Acushnet, Dartmouth, Fairhaven, and Westport) in the South Coast of Massachusetts. The museum is governed by the Old Dartmouth Historical Society (ODHS), which was established in 1903 "to create and foster an interest in the history of Old Dartmouth." Since then, the museum has expanded its scope to include programming that addresses global issues "including the consequences of natural resource exhaustion, the diversification of industry, and tolerance in a multicultural society." Its collections include over 750,000 items, including 3,000 pieces of scrimshaw and 2,500 logbooks from whaling ships, both of which are the largest collections in the world, as well as five complete whale skeletons. The museum's complex consists of several contiguous buildings housing 20 exhibit galleries and occupying an entire city block within the New Bedford Whaling National Historical Park, although operated independently.

The museum also houses a collection of fine art, including works by major American artists who lived or worked in the New Bedford area, such as Albert Bierstadt, William Bradford, and Albert Pinkham Ryder, as well as a collection of locally produced decorative art, glassware, and furniture associated with the rise of New Bedford as a whaling port in the 19th century.

The museum's Bourne Building houses the Lagoda, a half-scale model of a whaling ship that was commissioned in 1916 and is the world's largest model whaling ship.

== History ==
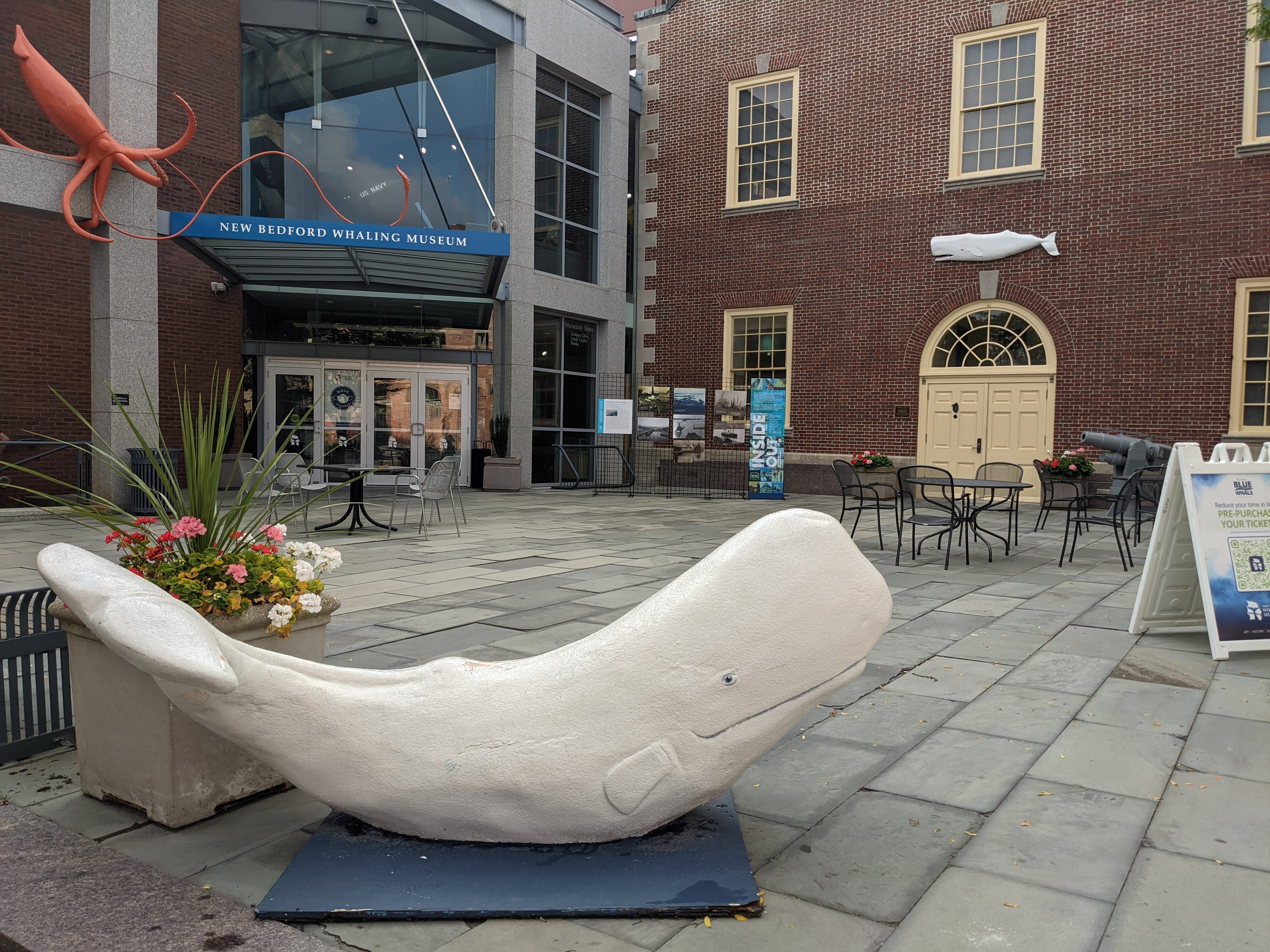
The entrance to the New Bedford Whaling Museum

On January 7, 1903, Ellis L. Howland, a news reporter for the Evening Standard, presented a paper urging the establishment of a historical society and a museum:

I believe that the need of a historical society arose not recently but generations ago when the history of New Bedford and vicinity commenced. Today we are suffering from the omission and if it is in the least deplorable it will be doubly a breach of our duty toward posterity to allow the lack to exist any longer ... True, there are a few old log books stored away in the public library or here and there in the closet of some private collector, but when one contemplates the tons and tons of them that have been ground up into wrapping paper of prosaic fiber wash tubs, the absence of a historical society becomes in our minds almost a crime.

On 22 July 1903, the 100 founding constituents of the Old Dartmouth Historical Society selected William W. Crapo, a local lawyer and congressman, as their president. At first, the museum rented rooms to display and store artifacts in the Masonic Lodge on the corner of Pleasant and Union Streets. By 1904, their membership had grown to almost 700, and collections had been expanded to include some 560 artifacts.

In 1906, Henry Huttleston Rogers donated the Bank of Commerce Building on Water Street to the ODHS for the purpose of establishing a museum. One year later, the New Bedford Whaling Museum was opened.

The New Bedford Whaling Museum grew considerably during the 1910s and 1920s. In 1914, the ODHS appointed Frank Wood as the curator and first full-time staff member. In 1915, Emily Bourne donated the Bourne Building in memory of her father, Jonathan Bourne Jr. She also contributed funds for the construction of a half-sized model of her father's ship Lagoda, which was built inside the Bourne Building in 1916. Nationwide interest in whaling history was raised by the 1922 film Down to the Sea in Ships, which was filmed in New Bedford and featured many New Bedford locals dressed up in their grandparents' clothing as extras.

By the 1930s, the New Bedford Whaling Museum was attracting four to ten thousand visitors a year, most of whom were from out of town. The museum further expanded with the bequest of the Wood Building by Annie Seabury Wood in 1935. In 1936, the museum acquired its first whale skeleton, a three-year-old humpback whale known as Quasimodo. In the words of curator William Tripp, "We are no longer a whaling museum without a whale, as some in the past have chosen to call us."

In 1953, the whaling film, All the Brothers Were Valiant, premiered in New Bedford.

The anti-whaling movement of the 1970s led Curator of Ethnology John R. Bockstoce to research and compile the most complete data on the bowhead whale to date, reestablishing the importance of the preservation of historical whaling documents.

In 1996, the museum played a large role in establishing a New Bedford Whaling National Historic Park, a national park that includes several New Bedford historical sites, including the Seamen's Bethel, which is located across the street from the Whaling Museum. The museum features a twenty-minute short film titled The City that Lit the World courtesy of the National Park Service. 1997 was the year of the first annual Moby-Dick Marathon Reading.

In 1998, the New Bedford Whaling Museum collaborated with the Azorean Maritime Heritage Society to build the Azorean Whaleman Gallery, an exhibition devoted to the contributions of Azorean sailors and whaleboat builders to US whaling history. In August 2000, the Jacobs Family Gallery was built thanks to the donation of Irwin and Joan Jacobs. The humpback whale skeleton Quasimodo was moved to the new Jacobs Family Gallery and suspended alongside a new juvenile blue whale skeleton, named KOBO (King of the Blue Ocean).

In October 2001, negotiations began to merge the Kendall Whaling Museum, which was founded in 1955 by Henry P. Kendall and opened in 1956, with the New Bedford Whaling Museum. The merger was finalized in October 2001, and the Kendall Whaling Museum's artifacts were moved to the New Bedford Whaling Museum by November 2002. As a result, the museum added some 70,000 artifacts to its collections, effectively doubling its size. To accommodate all these artifacts, the museum acquired a former bank building on Purchase Street three blocks west of the museum campus on Johnny Cake Hill. The Purchase Street Building housed the museum's Research Library for several years; in 2017 it moved to a new building on the main museum campus.

In 2002, the New Bedford Whaling Museum partnered with the Melville Society, and it now houses their extensive Melville collection in the Research Library.

In 2002, the museum acquired the skeleton of a sperm whale, and in 2008, it acquired the skeleton of a North Atlantic right whale which was pregnant at the time of its death.

In 2012, the Whaling Museum was featured in an episode of Four Weddings on TLC as one of the brides had her wedding reception at the museum.

== Permanent exhibits ==
=== Lagoda ===
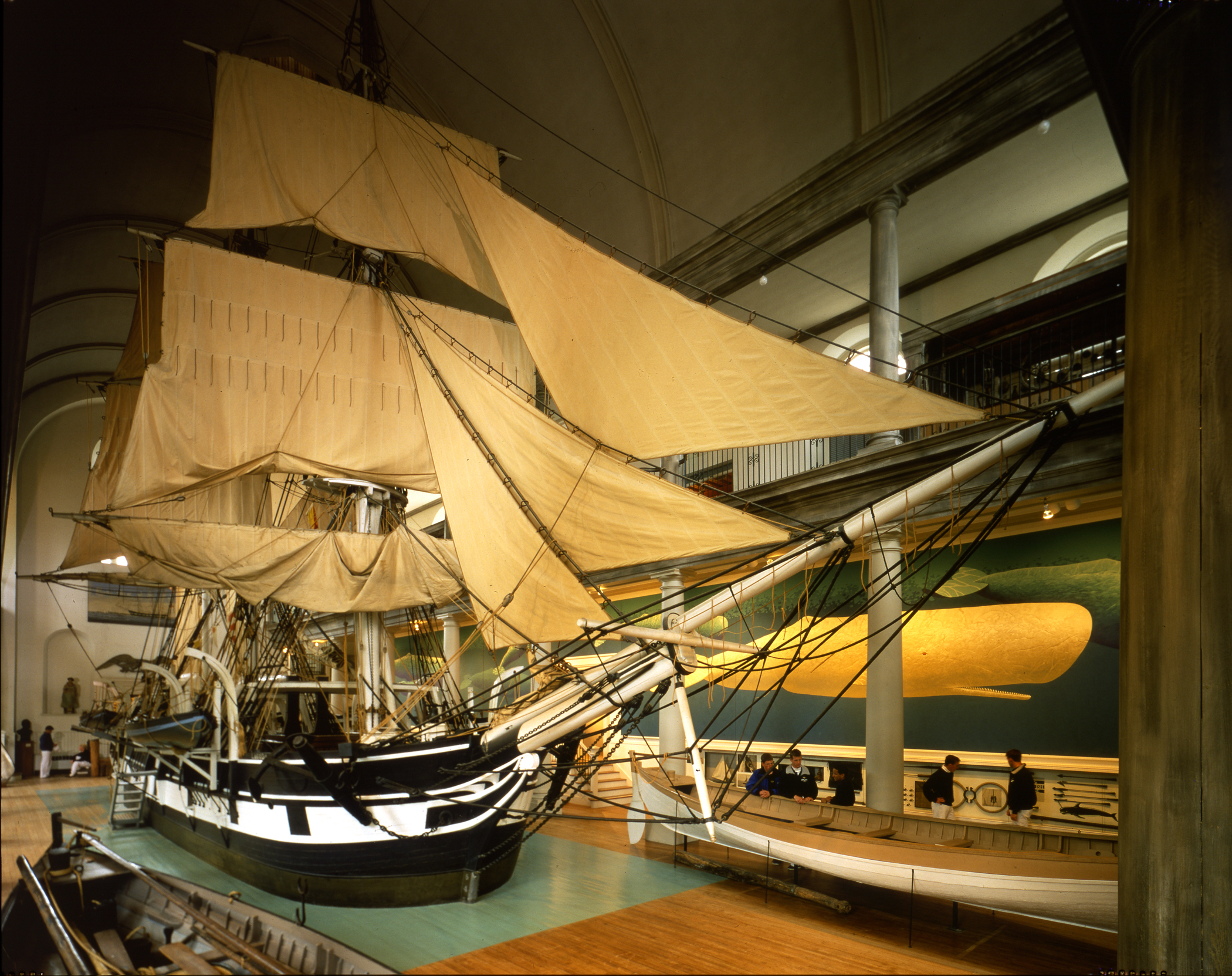
The Lagoda in the Bourne Building of the New Bedford Whaling Museum

The museum's Jonathan Bourne Building houses the Lagoda, a half-scale model built in 1916 of the ship Lagoda owned by Jonathan Bourne Jr. The Lagoda is 89 feet (27 m) in length and has a mainmast 50 feet (15 m) in height, making it the world's largest model whaling ship. It is fully rigged and showcases some of the supplies needed for an extended whaling voyage.

=== Azorean Whaleman Gallery ===
The Bourne Building also houses a permanent installation that explores the Azorean impact on the growth and development of Southern New England and of New Bedford in particular, which is home to a vibrant Azorean community. The exhibit contains many artifacts related to whaling in the Azores and the islanders' journey to a new life in the US via a "bridge of whale ships." The exhibit features a half-scale model of an Azorean whaleboat and a vigia, an Azorean whaling lookout.

=== Skeletons of the Deep ===
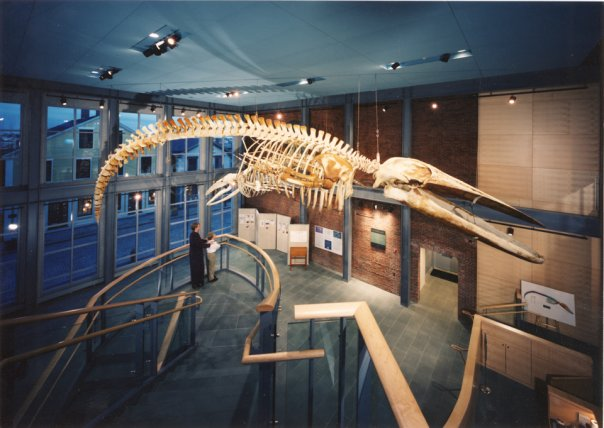
The blue whale skeleton known as KOBO (King of the Blue Ocean) at the New Bedford Whaling Museum

The museum is home to five fully articulated whale skeletons: a blue whale, a humpback whale, a sperm whale, and a pregnant mother and fetus North Atlantic right whale. All of the specimens came from animals that either died accidentally or by undetermined circumstances, and were not killed as a result of whaling. The first skeleton to be acquired was a 37-foot (11 m) three-year-old male humpback whale named Quasimodo, which died in 1932. The blue whale is a 66-foot (20 m) juvenile male named KOBO. The sperm whale is a 48-foot (15 m) 30-year-old male. The right whales include a 49-foot (15 m) 15-year-old female named Reyna that was ten months pregnant and her fetus.

=== Harbor Hope in Old Dartmouth, 1602–1827 ===
This exhibit explores the region of Old Dartmouth from the 1602 landing of English explorer Bartholomew Gosnold to the dominance of New Bedford in the whaling industry. It explores themes related to religion, geography, and maritime commerce, which combined to influence the colonial growth of southeastern Massachusetts and the ultimate success of the port of New Bedford, which surpassed Nantucket as the US's largest whaling center around 1827.

== Publications ==
- Bulletin from Johnny Cake Hill. A magazine published triannually by the New Bedford Whaling Museum and distributed to members. The magazine's topics include whaling history, local history, marine and landscape painting, decorative arts, exhibitions, and lectures.
- Blanchette, David. (2013). Xico: A Boy, A Rat, and a Whaleship. New Bedford, Massachusetts: Old Dartmouth Historical Society–New Bedford Whaling Museum.
- Blasdale, Mary Jean. (2012). American Landscape and Seascape Paintings. New Bedford, Massachusetts: Old Dartmouth Historical Society–New Bedford Whaling Museum.
- Frank, Stuart M. (2012). Ingenious Contrivances, Curiously Carved: Scrimshaw in the New Bedford Whaling Museum. Boston, Massachusetts: David R. Godine in association with the New Bedford Whaling Museum.
- Kauppila, Keith (2014). Benjamin Russell: Whaleman-Artist, Entrepreneur. New Bedford, Massachusetts: Old Dartmouth Historical Society–New Bedford Whaling Museum.
- Kugler Richard C. (1975). New Bedford and Old Dartmouth: A Portrait of the Region's Past. New Bedford, Massachusetts: Old Dartmouth Historical Society–New Bedford Whaling Museum.
- Kugler, Richard C. (1978). William Allen Wall: An Artist of New Bedford. New Bedford, Massachusetts: Old Dartmouth Historical Society–New Bedford Whaling Museum.
- Lapides, Michael. (2013). The Arctic Regions: Illustrated with Photographs Taken on an Art Expedition to Greenland by William Bradford. Boston, Massachusetts: David R. Godine in association with the New Bedford Whaling Museum.
- Lund, Judith N., et al. (2010). American Offshore Whaling Voyages, 1667–1927, Vol. I and II. New Bedford, Massachusetts: Old Dartmouth Historical Society–New Bedford Whaling Museum.
- Lund, Judith N.; Wall, R. Michael. (2013). Ship Models: Art and Artifacts from the New Bedford Whaling Museum. New Bedford, Massachusetts: Old Dartmouth Historical Society–New Bedford Whaling Museum.
- Monica, Maria F. (2013). The Dabneys: A Bostonian Family in the Azores, 1806–1871. New Bedford, Massachusetts: Luso-American Development Foundation in cooperation with the Old Dartmouth Historical Society–New Bedford Whaling Museum.
- Old Dartmouth Historical Society Sketches. (1903–1994). Topics related to the history of Southeastern Massachusetts by various authors. New Bedford, Massachusetts: Old Dartmouth Historical Society–New Bedford Whaling Museum.

== See also ==
- New Bedford Whaling National Historical Park
- List of maritime museums in the United States
- The Whaleman
