= Abolition Row =

Neighborhood in New Bedford, Massachusetts, US

Coordinates: 41°37′59.16″N 70°55′41.7″W

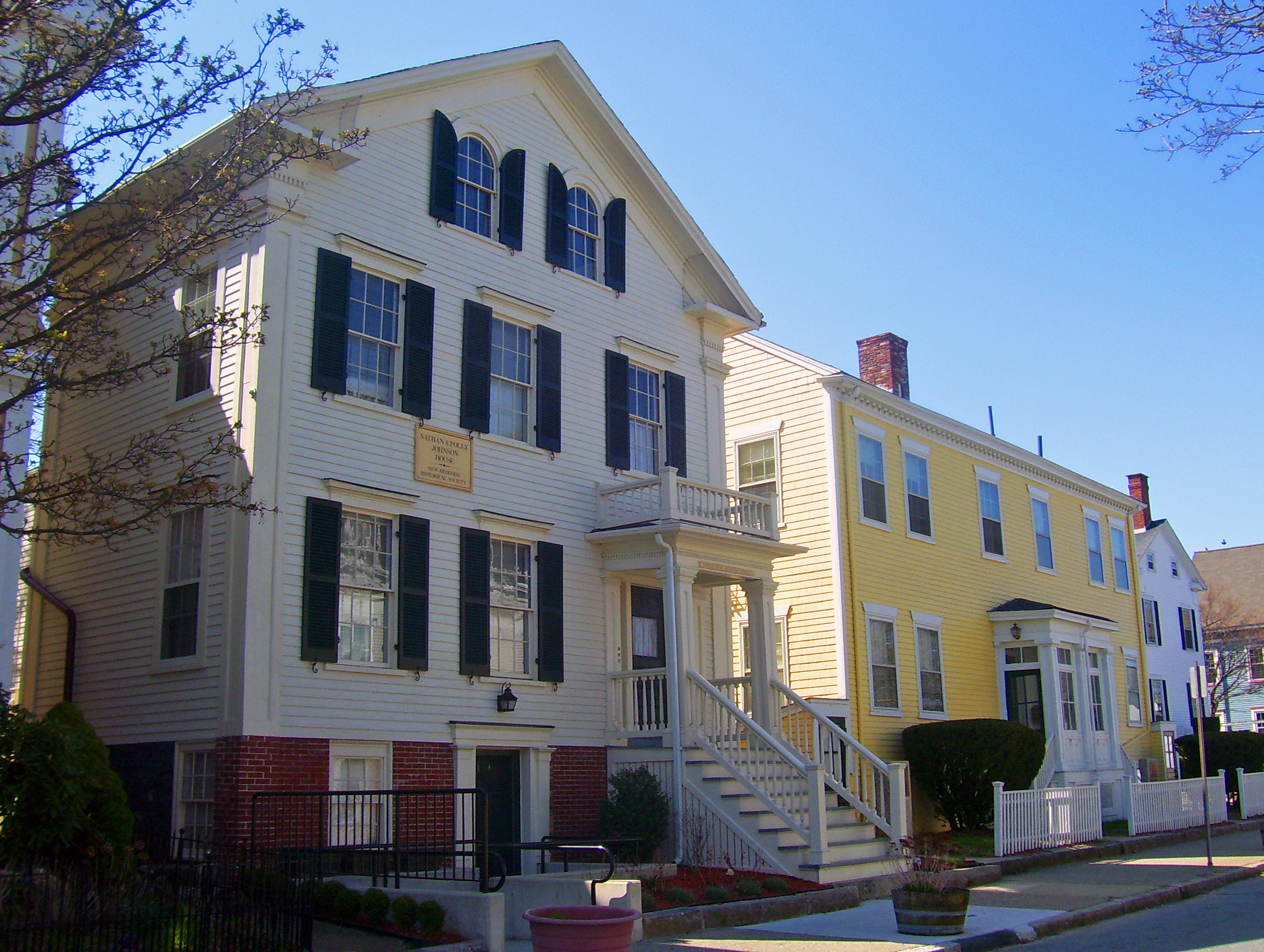
Nathan and Mary (Polly) Johnson properties, 21 Seventh Street, New Bedford, Massachusetts

Abolition Row is a neighborhood in New Bedford, Massachusetts. A number of the families that founded the town of New Bedford lived on Sixth and Seventh Streets and were active members of the Abolition movement in New Bedford. They also represent the whaling industry employers who employed a diverse workforce. It is located near the New Bedford Whaling National Historical Park.

== Overview ==
The one-square-mile neighborhood was the home to white and black abolitionists, including formerly enslaved people. Located on Seventh Street, abolitionists Nathan and Mary Johnson lived among their business partners and other anti-slavery advocates. Formerly enslaved people, Lewis Temple and Frederick Douglass, lived in Abolition Row. Although Massachusetts abolished slavery in 1783, federal laws like the Fugitive Slave Act of 1850 allowed enslavers to capture and re-enslave those that escaped bondage. New Bedford, however, had a network of abolitionists who worked to prevent peoples' re-enslavement. The neighborhood's houses are of Federal, Greek Revival, Gothic Revival and early Italian architecture.

There, in New Bedford, the black man's children—although anti-slavery was then far from popular—went to school side by side with the white children, and apparently without objection from any quarter. To make me at home, Mr. Johnson assured me that no slaveholder could take a slave from New Bedford; that there were men there who would lay down their lives, before such an outrage could be perpetrated. The colored people themselves were of the best metal, and would fight for liberty to the death. ... [they] are educated up to the point of fighting for their freedom, as well as speaking for it.

— Frederick Douglass, My Bondage and My Freedom (1855)

== Abolition Row Park ==
Abolition Row Park, developed by the New Bedford Historical Society, is located at Seventh and Spring Streets, near downtown New Bedford. It is in the Seaport Cultural District, where the Friends Meeting House (1820) and Nathan and Polly Johnson properties (1810) are located. The Johnson House was an Underground Railroad station and the first residence of Frederick Douglass and Anna Murray-Douglass. Both buildings are on the National Register of Historic Places. They were influential during the days of the Underground Railroad and the anti-slavery movement in New Bedford.

By late 2018, an archaeological dig was conducted at the site of the Abolition Row Park by the Plymouth Archaeological Rediscovery Project.

In 2017, a ground-breaking was conducted for the park, which will have a statue of abolitionist Frederick Douglass, a gazebo, a community garden, a border of Cherry trees, and markers about the historical significance of the Abolition Row area. In June 2019, the Mass Cultural Council (Cultural Facilities Fund) awarded The New Bedford Historical Society a grant of $180,000 to fund the memorial statue of Frederick Douglass and the development of the park. This is in addition to a grant from the Community Preservation Act of New Bedford for $125,000 and other grants from the U.S. Conference of Mayors Foundation, the Demoulas Foundation, and the Island Foundation. The grants meet the funding needed by The New Bedford Historical Society and the City of New Bedford. Representative Antonio F.D. Cabral and Senator Mark Montigny provided support for the Abolition Row Project. The park is scheduled to be completed in the summer of 2020.

== Exhibit ==
The University of Massachusetts Dartmouth Art Gallery held an exhibit from November 2018 through January 2019 of Abolition Row entitled "Black Spaces Matter: Celebrating New Bedford's Abolition Row". It included documentary films, virtual-reality tours of the neighborhood, historic photographs and maps, illustrations, and 3-D print models.
