= Lewis Temple =

Lewis Temple may refer to:

- Lewis Temple (inventor) (1800–1854), American abolitionist, blacksmith, and inventor
- Lewis Temple (footballer) (born 2005), Irish footballer

== See also ==
- Lew Temple (born 1967), American actor
