= Frank J. Webb =

African-American novelist, poet and essayist (1828-1894)

- Born: March 21, 1828; Philadelphia
- Died: 1894 (aged 65–66)
- Occupations: Novelist, poet, and essayist
- Spouse(s): Mary Espartero; Mary Rodgers

Francis Johnson Webb (March 21, 1828 – 1894) was an American novelist, poet, and essayist from Philadelphia, Pennsylvania. His novel, The Garies and Their Friends (1857), was the second novel by an African American to be published, and the first to portray the daily lives of free blacks in the North.

== Biography ==
=== Early life and family ===
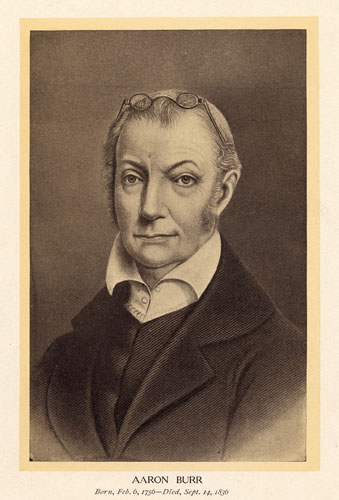
Aaron Burr, Webb's maternal grandfather

Frank Webb was born in Philadelphia on March 21, 1828. He was the fifth and youngest child of Francis Webb (1788–1829) and Louisa Burr Webb (c. 1785–1878). His maternal grandfather, which was confirmed via DNA in 2018, is former U.S. Vice President Aaron Burr.

Webb had one brother, John (1823-1904), and three sisters, Elizabeth (1818–1888), Ann (1820–1884), and Mary (1824–1826). His parents and older siblings were among thousands of free African Americans who had left the United States in 1824 and returned in 1826, as part of the failed Haitian emigration experiment.

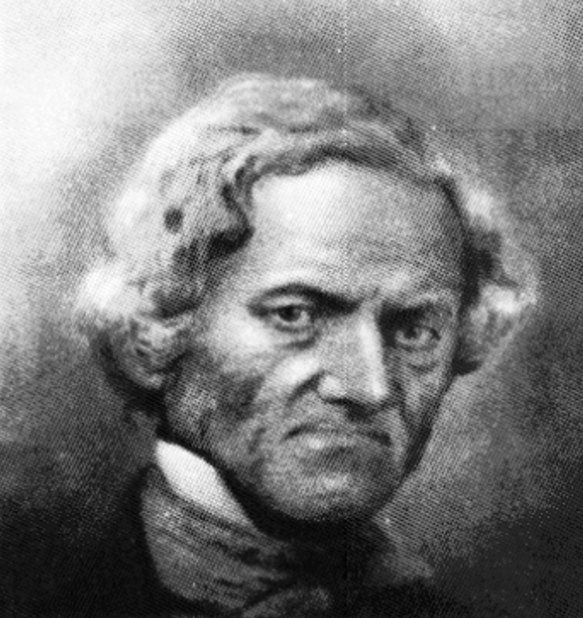
John Pierre Burr, uncle of Frank Webb

Webb's mother, Louisa Burr, was a daughter of Aaron Burr. She and her brother John Pierre Burr, a prominent activist in Philadelphia's black community, were born to a Bengali mother from Calcutta, India named Mary Emmons, who served in Burr's household as a governess. Louisa Burr Webb worked most of her life for Mrs. Elizabeth Powel Francis Fisher, a prominent Philadelphia society matron closely connected to the oldest Philadelphia families, and mother of prominent Philadelphia businessman Joshua Francis Fisher. After Francis Webb's death, Louisa remarried and became Louisa Darius.

Webb's father, Francis Webb, served in Philadelphia as an elder in the First African Presbyterian Church, a parishioner at the African Episcopal Church of St. Thomas, a founding member of the Pennsylvania Augustine Education Society formed in 1818, and secretary of the Haytien Emigration Society organized in 1824. He worked as the Philadelphia distribution agent for Freedom's Journal from 1827 to 1829. While living in Port au Platt, Haiti, from 1824 to 1826, he served on the Board of Instruction of a joint Episcopal-Presbyterian church school. He died of unknown causes in 1829, a year after Frank's birth.

=== Marriage and early career ===
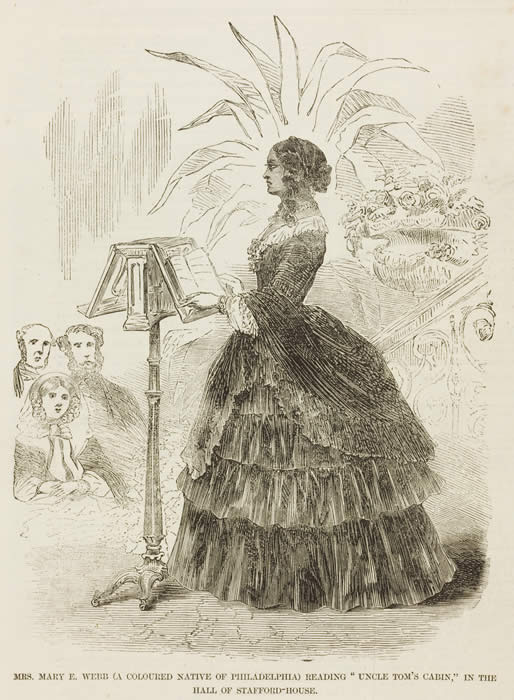
Mary E. Webb performing a dramatic reading in London, 1856

As a young man, Frank Webb worked in Philadelphia's vibrant community of free African Americans as a commercial artist. In 1845, at the age of 17, Webb married Mary Espartero, who had been born in New Bedford, Massachusetts in 1828, shortly after her mother had escaped from slavery in Virginia. Her father was described as "a Spanish gentleman of wealth [who] had made many efforts to purchase the freedom of her mother". Through her mother's efforts, Mary was admitted to a school where her education included poetry and dramatic literature, and developed a talent for performance. As an adult in Philadelphia, she studied elocution.

Mary soon gained renown for her dramatic readings of works by Shakespeare, Longfellow, and Philip Sheridan. She attracted the attention of Harriet Beecher Stowe and other prominent literary abolitionists. Stowe was so impressed by the readings that she acted as her patron, adapting scenes from her best selling novel Uncle Tom's Cabin expressly for Mary Webb's performance. In late 1855 and 1856, Mary Webb toured the north-eastern United States, including a performance of Uncle Tom attended by Longfellow, who wrote, "A striking scene, this Cleopatra with a white wreath in her dark hair, and a sweet, musical voice, reading to a great, unimpassioned, immovable Boston audience."

Stowe then helped to arrange a transatlantic tour for the Webbs, and provided a letter of introduction which included her own praise and a postscript that Longfellow had been "much pleased with Mrs. Webb's reading of his new poem Hiawatha". The Webbs traveled to England in 1856, where Mary's dramatic readings garnered further acclaim. The couple received a warm welcome from many British nobles. While in London, Webb asked his friend, Charles Sumner, to write an introductory letter for his wife during her reading tour in Liverpool.

In 1857, when Frank Webb was 29, the London firm of G. Routledge and Company published his first and only novel, The Garies and Their Friends. Webb dedicated his book to supporter Lady Noel Byron, who had encouraged him, and Henry, Lord Brougham wrote an enthusiastic introduction. It was published with an additional preface by Stowe.

The international tour had taken a severe toll on Mary Webb's health, and on the advice of physicians who recommended a warmer climate, the Webbs made an extended visit to Cannes in 1857–1858. The Webbs then relocated in 1858 to Kingston, Jamaica, where Webb's British friends secured him a job with the postal service. However, Mary Webb died there on June 17, 1859.

=== Later career and second family ===
Frank Webb continued to live in Jamaica for over ten years, from 1858 to 1869, and remarried before returning to the United States. Webb's second wife was Mary Rosabelle Rodgers (b. 1845), the daughter of a Jamaican merchant. They had four children before moving in 1869 to the United States, where they had two more children.

From late 1869 through 1870, Webb lived in Washington, DC, where he resumed writing. Webb published several essays, poems, and two novellas for the African American journal The New Era. The weekly had been founded in Washington, DC and was taken over that year by Frederick Douglass, who published it through 1874.

While in Washington writing for The New Era in 1869–1870, Webb lived with his niece, teacher Sara Iredell, who had recently married Christian Fleetwood, recipient of the Medal of Honor for his military service during the Civil War. Fleetwood was then a clerk for the Freedmen's Bureau, established during the Reconstruction era after the American Civil War.

Later in 1870, the Webbs moved to Galveston, Texas, which had developed a vibrant black community after the Civil War. In 1876, Webb served as an alternative delegate to the Republican state convention.

Webb worked in Galveston first as a newspaper editor, then as a postal clerk, and finally for thirteen years as principal of the Barnes Institute, a segregated school for "colored children".

He died in Galveston, Texas in 1894.

Webb had six children, all of whom were from his second marriage. They were:

- Dr. Frank J. Webb Jr. (1865–1901), an 1895 graduate of Howard University Medical School
- Evangeline Webb (1866–1945)
- Ruth M.A. Webb (1867–1930)
- Clarice Webb (1869–1962)
- Ethelind Webb (1874–1969)
- Thomas Rodgers Webb (1877–1964)

== The Garies and Their Friends ==
=== Literary significance ===
Webb was the second African American, after William Wells Brown, to publish a novel. Although The Garies and Their Friends received favorable reviews in England, it went relatively unnoticed in the United States during the 19th century, receiving little attention until editions were published in 1969 and 1997.

Although he did not publish another novel after The Garies and Their Friends, Webb wrote poems, articles, and two novellas, which were published in 1870 in The New Era, a weekly publication based in Washington, D.C., which had recently been taken over by Frederick Douglass as publisher. Webb is not known to have published any other works.

In the later 20th century, following the Civil Rights Movement and renewed appreciation for the works of minority authors, Webb's novel was reprinted in 1969 and critically appraised. (It was published in a new edition in 1997.) It was the first novel by an African American to focus on the lives of free blacks in the North, rather than those in slavery. It was the first "to treat passing in great depth and the first to show white mob violence against blacks in the North."

Its critique of northern white racism, including its satirical portraits of several "benevolent-minded" but patronizing white Philadelphians, may have made it unpalatable in the nineteenth century to the readers who had made sentimental abolitionist works like Uncle Tom's Cabin best sellers. Its frank and sympathetic portrayal of the Garies' mixed-race "marriage" would likely have offended progressive readers on both sides of the color line.

Critical perspectives on the novel since its 1969 republication have been mixed. While Webb is often faulted for his sentimentalism and his apparent embrace of white middle-class values, he has also been credited for his realistic portrayal of the tense relations between whites and blacks in Philadelphia, one of the most racially integrated cities in the United States at mid-century and one with an active abolitionist movement. It had been a major destination of Irish immigrants since the mid-century and, faced with their own struggles against discrimination, they competed with blacks for jobs, housing, and respect. Webb specifically features enmity of the Irish toward the blacks in Philadelphia in his novel; they form a mob attack against blacks and abolitionists.

Gardner believes the novel demonstrates that Webb was well-educated, as it shows influences from literature and Anglo-American culture, as well as a large sense of black history, both in the United States and the Caribbean. For instance, he notes that Webb discusses Toussaint Louverture, leader of the slave revolt in Haiti, in early passages of the book. Walters keeps a portrait of the leader on his wall. Gardner notes that Webb deeply explores the phenomenon of "passing" through the experiences of different characters in the North and South, and others' reactions to them.

Bernard Bell noted that Webb placed faith in blacks' working to achieve social mobility, gaining respect by amassing economic gains, rather than through appeals to Christian values. While recognizing that Webb rewards virtue over villainy in his novel, in a way characteristic of a historical romance, he notes the nuanced characterization. For instance, Webb portrays both Charlie Ellis and his friend Kinch as having a "healthy variety of human traits." While thoroughly demonstrating white racial prejudice, Webb also shows white persons who are redeemed by changing their attitudes through personal encounters and interaction with several of the characters in the novel, and leave prejudice behind.

=== Synopsis ===
The narrative features two families: Clarence Garie, a wealthy white planter and slave holder in Georgia, and his common-law wife Emily, his mulatto slave mistress; in contrast to a free working-class black family in Philadelphia, headed by Charles and Ellen Ellis. The Garies are prohibited from marrying by state law but have a loving relationship and two children, Clarence and Emily. Because their mother is a slave, the children are legally slaves, although their father and master is raising them as his own. Both children look white. He cannot readily free them under Georgia law. As the novel opens, the couple are visited by Emily's cousin George Winston, a mixed-race man who was educated and freed when young and is now passing for white.

The Garies are initially contrasted with a working class African American family living in Philadelphia: carpenter Charles Ellis, his wife Ellen, and their three children: Esther, Caroline (also called Caddy), and Charlie. Winston had worked as a boy for Ellis in Savannah, before he moved North, and encounters him again in Philadelphia.

Worried that she and her children might suffer in slavery if anything happened to Clarence Garie, Emily persuades him to move to Philadelphia so they can gain freedom and what she believes will be better education and opportunity. Her cousin Winston has reported on the city favorably, especially following his reconnection with Ellis and his family. He tells the Garies about the community of free blacks, who had established a library, independent churches, thriving businesses, and many services. A white friend warns Garie that while his circle in the South may accept men with their mixed-race mistresses, he will encounter more prejudice as a couple in the North.

After getting settled in Philadelphia, the Garies do begin to struggle. Neighbors, an attorney known as "Slippery George" Stevens and his wife Mrs. Stevens, pull back from early friendliness when they see that Emily is of mixed race. The first minister Garie engages to officially marry him and Emily refuses when he sees that she is of African descent. Learning that the Garie children are enrolled at the same school as hers, Mrs. Stevens severely pressures the school mistress, a single woman supporting her mother, by threatening to withdraw her children and tell other parents of the Garies' race. That would close the school.

On another front, attorney Stevens arranges with an Irish man he is defending to have attacks made against blacks in their neighborhood and mob action to drive down property values; he intends to buy property there and profit later from it. He makes a list of properties to be attacked, including that of Walters, a black man who has become one of the wealthiest businessmen in the city, abolitionists, and Garie, even contracting for him to be murdered. Learning of the plot from a list of properties to be attacked, Walters tells the mayor about it and asks for protection, but the mayor says he does not have enough forces, and the area of action is south of the city boundaries. Walters stores up arms and fortifies his house; the Ellises seek safety with him, and other friends arrive to help. With the community warned by Walters, many blacks leave the area for refuge in the upper city.

In the mob attacks, the Ellises' home is burned and totally destroyed; Ellis is attacked by the mob and severely injured while trying to warn Garie. He is brain damaged and never works again. Garie is shot and killed as the mob attacks his house; his wife Emily dies in childbirth in hiding with their children, who survive. The families are nearly destroyed by Stevens' plot. The boy Charlie Ellis has been spared from the events, as he has been in the country for the summer at the home of Mrs. Bird, a wealthy white woman who acts as his patron. Receiving letters from his older sister and a friend about the attacks, he returns to his family in the city, who are staying with Walters.

He goes to work to help his family, encountering prejudice as he applies for apprenticeships but secures a good position finally. Walters and Balch, a white attorney advising him, provide for the orphaned Garie children whom Walters takes in, and work to gain some of their due inheritance. Their father died without a will and Stevens claims the estate, as a first cousin through Garie's sister. Balch threatens Stevens with legal action over the mob riot to secure money. Walter and Balch reluctantly decide, in order to give Clarence every advantage, to enroll him as a white student in a distant academy and have him enter white society. They instruct him not to reveal his "colored" ancestry.

Years later that decision has complicated his life. Although he visits his sister Emily, there is distance between them as their lives have gone in separate directions. He becomes engaged to Anne Bates, a white woman whose family prejudice against blacks causes him grief. Emily has become engaged to Charlie Ellis. Esther Ellis has married Walters and has two children with him. Her sister Caddy becomes engaged to Kinch, Charlie's childhood friend and now a prosperous dandy.

Clarence's secret is revealed at the Bates' by a chance visit from George Stevens, Jr. who recognizes him and, after Clarence leaves, tells Anne's father of his past. Stevens and Bates go to Clarence's hotel room, ordering him never to see Anne again and to return her letters to her father. He is destroyed but has a long life to get through.

More events bring Stevens Sr. and McCloskey to a kind of justice at the end of their lives. McCloskey confessed before his death to Balch and a magistrate, turning over to them the original Garie will. Stevens' daughter had overheard McCloskey's blackmail threats and her father talked with her about turning over his ill-gotten fortune to the Garie children as rightful heirs. Stevens jumps out a window to his death to avoid arrest for the murder of Garie and others.

Clarence declined, cut off from white society as news spread about him, and cutting himself off from those he left before. He dies spiritually and finally returns to Philadelphia to his sister and Charlie. He sends word to Anne to see him again; she has also lost heart after following her father's wishes and never stopped loving Clarence. She goes to him but reaches him just after his death. She dies a few years later, "passed away to join her lover, where distinctions in race or colour are unknown, and where the prejudices of earth cannot mar their happiness."

== Works ==
- The Garies and Their Friends (novel, 1857)
- "None Spoke a Single Word to Me" (poem, The New Era, 1870)
- "Waiting" (poem, 1870)
- "International Exhibition" (editorial, The New Era, 1870)
- "The Mixed School Question" (editorial, The New Era, 1870)
- "An Old Foe with a New Face" (editorial, The New Era, 1870)
- Two Wolves and a Lamb (novella, The New Era, 1870)
- Marvin Hayle (novella, The New Era, 1870)
