= Mary Emmons =

Mistress of Vice President Aaron Burr (c. 1760–c. 1832)

- Born: c. 1760; Calcutta, India
- Died: c. 1832; Philadelphia, United States
- Children: Louisa Charlotte Burr; John Pierre Burr

Mary Emmons (c. 1760 – c. 1832), also known as Eugénie Beauharnais, was a Haitian governess who may have been born in Calcutta, India who worked as a servant in the household of Theodosia Bartow Prevost. While working as a servant, she had a relationship with Theodosia's second husband, American Founding Father and Vice President Aaron Burr, by whom she had two children: a daughter, Louisa Charlotte, born 1788, and a son, John Pierre Burr, born 1792.

== Biography ==
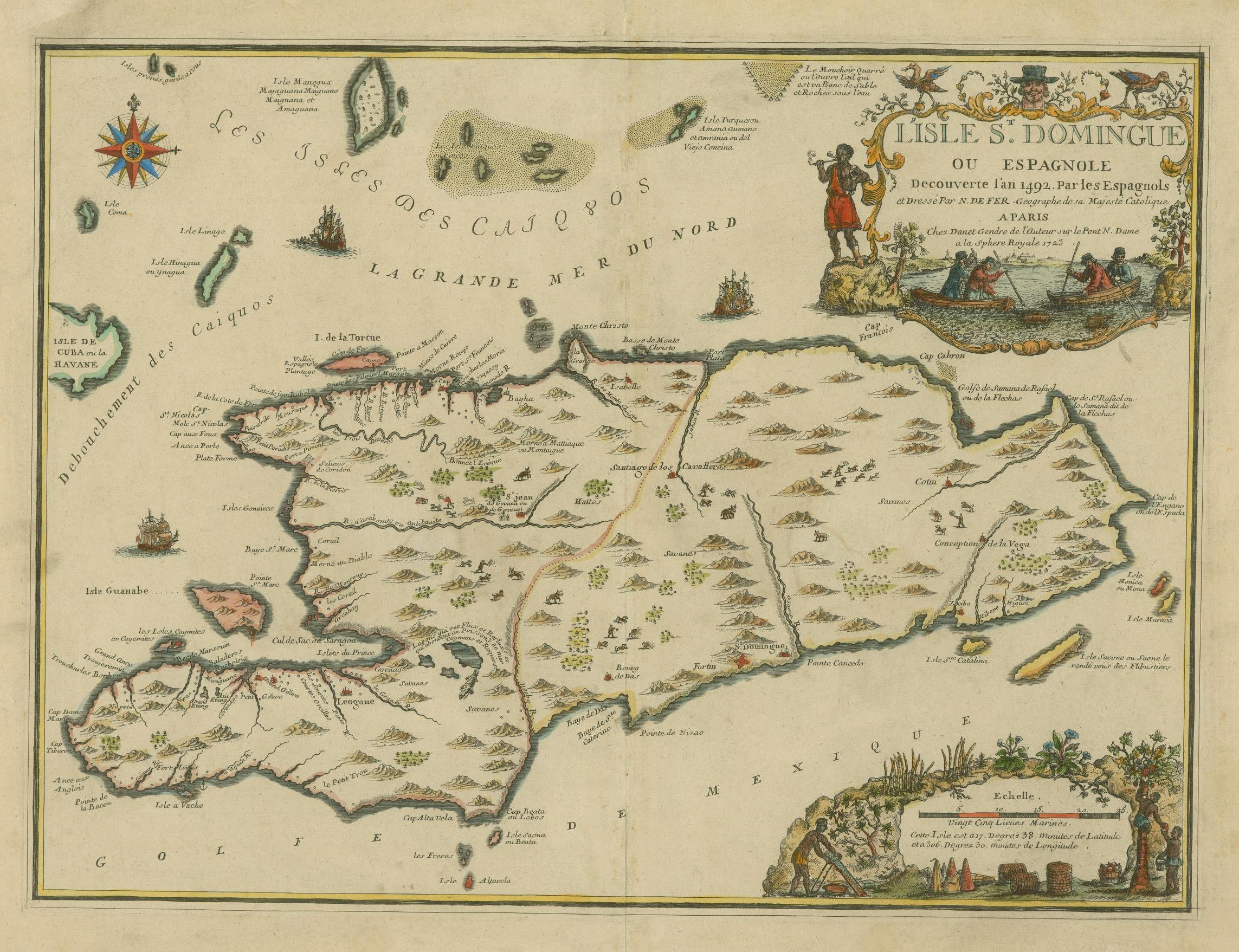
French map of Saint-Domingue

Slavery in India continued through the 18th and 19th centuries. The Portuguese imported Africans into their Indian colonies on the Konkan coast between about 1530 and 1740. Little is known about Emmons's early life. The oral history is she was a colored woman born in Calcutta, who traveled to Saint-Domingue (modern day Haiti) where she then lived and worked. Described as mulatto, she originally immigrated to the Thirteen Colonies as a servant of Theodosia Prevost and her first husband, Jacques Marcus Prevost, a British military officer who was stationed in the West Indies in the early 1770s. She changed her name to Mary Emmons upon entering the United States.

After Theodosia married Burr in 1782 (following her husband's death), Emmons entered the Burr household in New York. Emmons's first child with Burr was Louisa Charlotte Burr, born in 1788. In 1792, Emmons gave birth to her second child with Burr, John Pierre Burr, at sea while she was travelling back to the United States after a visit to Haiti.

While raising her two children, Emmons resided in Philadelphia, at the home where Burr stayed while serving in the U.S. Senate – while his wife Theodosia still lived in New York. The fact that both Theodosia and Emmons gave birth in 1788 shows that Burr was having intimate relations with both women at the same time.

Emmons died in Philadelphia in 1832.

== Children ==
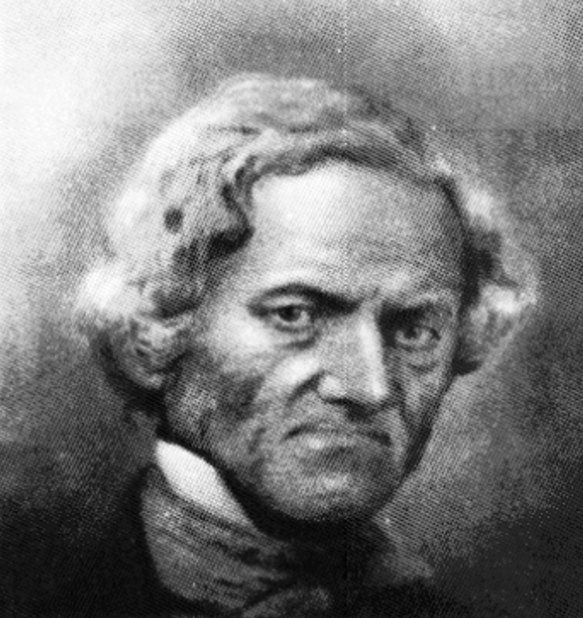
John Pierre Burr, one of Emmons's children

Emmons's daughter Louisa Charlotte married Francis Webb, a free black man in Pennsylvania, and was the mother of Frank J. Webb, an American novelist who wrote The Garies and Their Friends (1857), the second novel by an African American to be published.

Emmons's son, John Pierre Burr, married Hester (Hetty) Elizabeth Emery and was very active in the abolitionist movement. An organizer of the Pennsylvania Anti-Slavery Society, John Pierre operated a barbershop that became a station on the Underground Railroad.

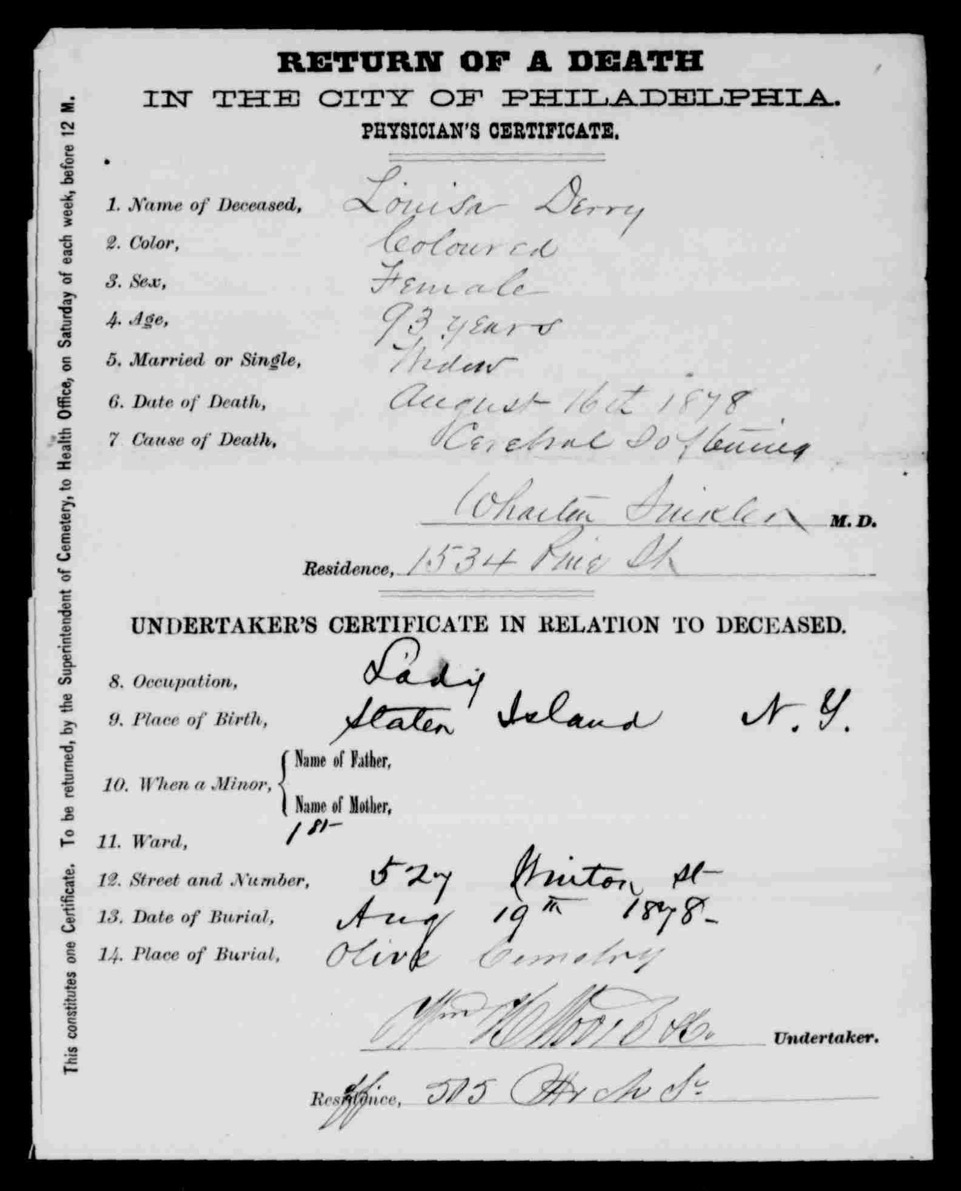
The death certificate of Emmons's daughter, Louisa Charlotte Burr

Aaron Burr never acknowledged the fact that he had a relationship or children with Emmons during his lifetime – nor did he mention his children with Emmons in his will, even though he did mention two of his other illegitimate children in it. Additionally, the death certificates of both Louisa Ann and John Pierre both leave the slots for "Mother" and "Father" blank. However, according to a descendant of Burr and Emmons, historian Dr. Allen Ballard, Emmons married Burr shortly after his first wife Theodosia's death, which would have legitimized their two children.

== Legacy ==
As Emmons was never publicly acknowledged by Aaron Burr in his lifetime, the fact of their relationship was unknown to historians and passed down as oral history throughout Emmons's descendants. One descendant, "Aunt Doll", even had a marriage certificate showing that Burr and Emmons were married, but destroyed it in frustration because of other relatives' lack of interest in the family history.

In 2005, Louella Burr Mitchell Allen notified the Aaron Burr Association that she was related to Aaron Burr and presented family documents and oral histories describing Emmons and her descendants. Although there was no opportunity at the time for DNA testing, members of the Aaron Burr Association embraced Allen as family and invited her to speak at an Association meeting about the oral history she had.

In 2019, Sherri Burr, another descendant of Emmons, found more conclusive evidence of Emmons's relationship, including a letter sent from Lucia Charlotte Burr to Aaron Burr, DNA testing evidence, and a property deed involving a plot of land that Aaron Burr bought for his son John Pierre. The Aaron Burr Association then formally recognized Emmons's son John Pierre Burr as a son of Aaron Burr and installed a new headstone declaring his ancestry at his grave. Stuart Fisk Johnson, the president of the Association at the time, commented, "A few people didn't want to go into it because Aaron's first wife, Theodosia, was still alive, and dying of cancer [when Aaron fathered John Pierre] ... But the embarrassment is not as important as it is to acknowledge and embrace actual living, robust, accomplished children."

== Family tree ==
Descendants of Mary Emmons and Aaron Burr

Mary Emmons aka Eugenie Beauharnais	Aaron Burr; 1756–1836
Hetty Emery; 1795-?	John Pierre Burr; 1792–1864	Louisa Charlotte Burr; 1784–1878	Francis Webb; 1788–1829
Ann A. Webb; 1820–1884	Elizabeth S. Webb; 1818–1888	John G. Webb; 1823–1904	Frank J. Webb; 1828–1894

== Popular culture ==
In 2013, artist Camilla Huey included a portrait of Emmons as part of nine corset portraits of women in Aaron Burr's life in the exhibition "The Loves of Aaron Burr: Portraits in Corsetry & Binding."

The 2019 novel The Secret Wife of Aaron Burr by Susan Holloway Scott is a fictional account of Emmons's life. Scott writes that because so little was known about Emmons, she took the liberty of creating imagined details of her life herself.

== Bibliography ==
- Isenberg, Nancy (2007). Fallen Founder: The Life of Aaron Burr. Penguin Books. ISBN 978-0-14-311371-3.
- Oppenheimer, Margaret (2015). The Remarkable Rise of Eliza Jumel: A Story of Marriage and Money in the Early Republic. Chicago Review Press. ISBN 978-1-61373-383-7.
- Stillwell, John E. (1928). The History of the Burr Portraits, Their Origin, Their Dispersal and Their Reassemblage. New York? : s.n.
