= John Pierre Burr =

American abolitionist and community leader (1792–1864)

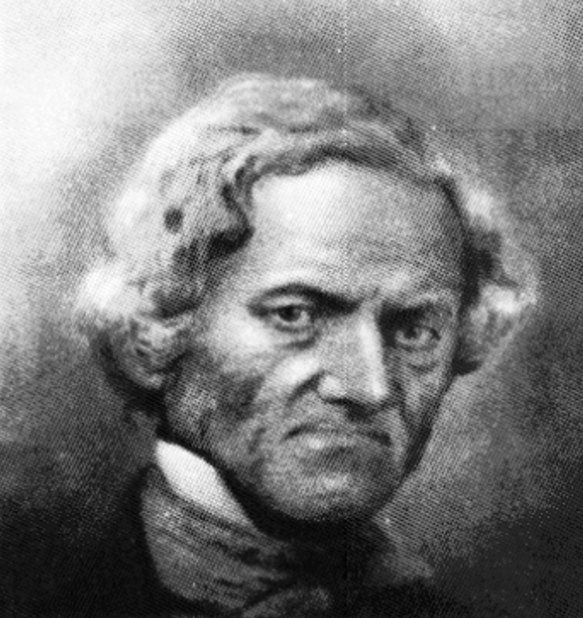
- John Pierre Burr
- Born: June 1792; New Jersey or Pennsylvania, U.S.
- Died: April 4, 1864 (aged 71); Philadelphia, Pennsylvania, U.S.
- Spouse: Hester Elizabeth Emory
- Children: 9
- Parents: Aaron Burr; Mary Emmons

John Pierre Burr (June 1792 – April 4, 1864) was an American abolitionist and community leader in Philadelphia, Pennsylvania, active in education and civil rights for African Americans. He was an illegitimate child of Aaron Burr, the third U.S. vice president, and Mary Emmons, a Haitian governess who may have been born in Calcutta, India.

== Early life and education ==
Based on accounts of some of Burr's contemporaries, as well as oral tradition and family histories maintained by Burr's descendants, politician Aaron Burr fathered two illegitimate children with a Haitian governess named Mary Emmons, who may have also been Bengali, who worked in his household in Philadelphia during his first marriage. John (or Jean) Pierre Burr, the younger of the two, was born in 1792 in either New Jersey or Philadelphia to Mary Emmons, a.k.a. Eugénie Beauharnais, a servant or governess in the household of politician Aaron Burr and his first wife Theodosia Bartow Prevost. Before being brought to Philadelphia, Mary/Eugénie was said to have lived and worked in Haiti or Saint-Domingue; an early source said that she was born there, while other sources suggest that she was from Calcutta. She may have been brought to Philadelphia by Theodosia's first husband, Jacques Marcus Prevost, a British military officer who was stationed in the West Indies in the early 1770s.

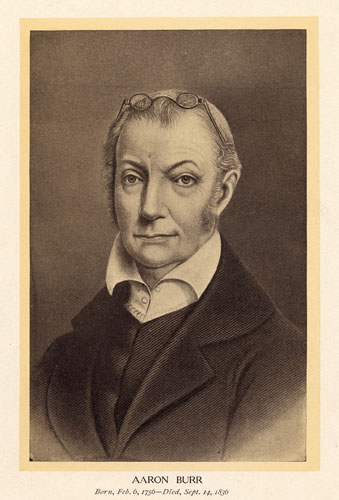
A later portrait of Aaron Burr, c. early 1800s

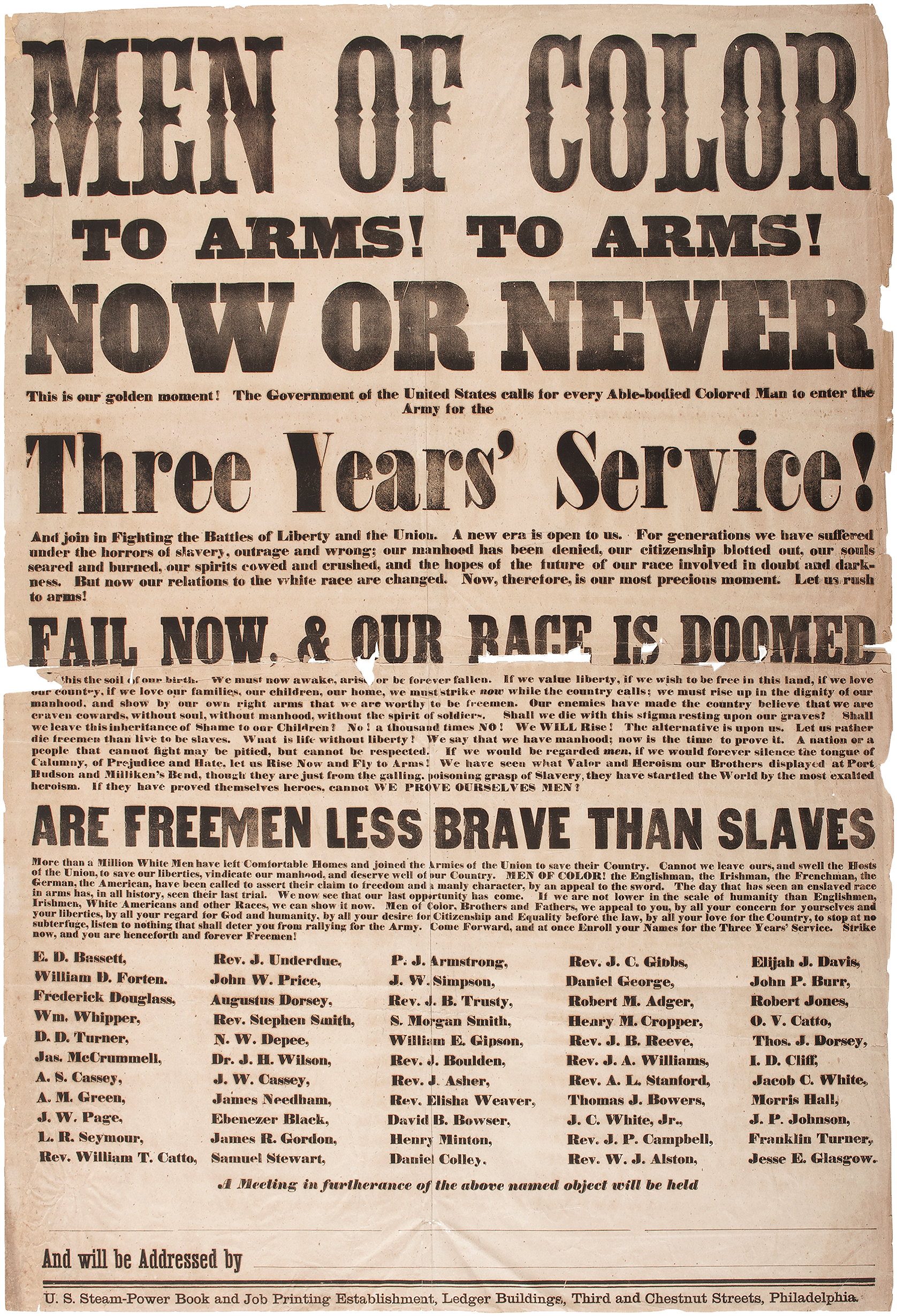
1863 broadside, listing Burr as a speaker, calling men of color to arms.

Burr had an older sister, Louisa Charlotte Burr, born 1788, also the daughter of Aaron Burr and Mary Emmons. Louisa Burr worked most of her life as a domestic servant in the household of Philadelphia society matron, Elizabeth Powel Francis Fisher, and after her death, in the home of Mrs. Fisher's only child, Joshua Francis Fisher. Louisa Burr married Francis Webb (1788–1829), a founding member of the Pennsylvania Augustine Education Society, secretary of the Haytien Emigration Society formed in 1824, and distributor of Freedom's Journal from 1827 to 1829. Her son (and John Pierre Burr's nephew), Frank J. Webb, wrote the second published novel by an African American author, The Garies and Their Friends, published in 1857.

== Career ==
Burr worked as a barber in the city of Philadelphia, and by 1818 had his own business, a whites-only barber shop in the front room of his home.

He was an abolitionist, and an active member of the Underground Railroad in Philadelphia. As a free state, Pennsylvania had abolished slavery after the Revolution; it offered freedom to those slaves brought to the state voluntarily by their masters. In addition, as it bordered states of the Upper South, the state and its waterways became destinations for fugitive slaves. Burr would hide runaways in his house. Because Burr was of mixed race and light-skinned, he often accompanied refugees to their next stop in the city or environs. If they were questioned by police, Burr would simply say he was taking "his man" (personal servant) out for a walk.

Burr was also an organizer of the Pennsylvania Anti-Slavery Society, one of several civil rights organizations in which he was active. Burr served on its Vigilance Committee to directly aid fugitive slaves. Together with other members of the Pennsylvania Anti-Slavery Society, Burr helped raise money for the defense of men indicted for treason in Lancaster County, Pennsylvania, for what was then called the Christiana Riot of 1851, now known as the Christiana Resistance. The mixed group of blacks and whites had resisted U.S. Marshals and slaveholders trying to capture fugitive slaves who had been living in southern Pennsylvania; this incident was part of popular resistance to the Fugitive Slave Law of 1850. After the first suspect was rapidly acquitted, the federal prosecutor dropped charges against the other defendants.

Burr's activities ranged from promoting emigration by American blacks to Haiti after it founded its republic, to serving as an agent for the abolitionist newspaper, The Liberator, published by William Lloyd Garrison in Boston and distributed nationally. He worked on civil rights, protesting disfranchisement of free blacks by the state legislature in 1838, and sheltering fugitive slaves.

As chairman of the board of the American Moral Reform Society, Burr helped publish its journal, the National Reformer. He was involved in the National Black Convention movement of the early 1830s. Burr served as an officer for the Mechanics' Enterprise Hall, the Moral Reform Retreat (a shelter for African-American women co-founded by Hetty Reckless and Hetty Burr), and the Colored Citizens of Philadelphia. He worked with other leaders such as Robert Purvis and Rev. William Catto, father of Octavius Catto.

With associates, Burr founded the Demosthenian Institute of Philadelphia at his home on January 10, 1837. First known as a literary society, its members trained young black men in their early 20s to prepare for public speaking, like a Toastmasters of its time. They took turns preparing and giving speeches, discussed current political topics, and answered questions posed by fellow members. They intended the institute to be a kind of preparatory school until members gained experience and skills in public speaking. By 1841, the Institute had 42 members, and its library had collected more than 100 scientific and historical works. The Demosthenian Shield, its weekly paper, was first published on June 29, 1841, with some guidance from staff of the Colored American, an established black newspaper of the time. Organizers collected a subscription list of more than 1,000 persons to support the paper before its first issue was published.

Burr joined the African Episcopal Church of St. Thomas in Philadelphia, founded by Absalom Jones in 1782 as the first black Episcopal congregation. Burr worked with Jones, who was ordained in 1804 as the first black Episcopal priest, to build the congregation's second church. Burr also helped develop the membership, among whom were many leaders in the black community.

With his activities and leadership skills, Burr became a member of the elite class of free blacks in Philadelphia. He was among those who signed Frederick Douglass's "Men of Color to Arms" poster for recruiting during the Civil War. He also met with members of the Quakers, many of whom supported abolition, such as John Greenleaf Whittier. The poet later wrote about Burr in his letters.

== Marriage and family ==
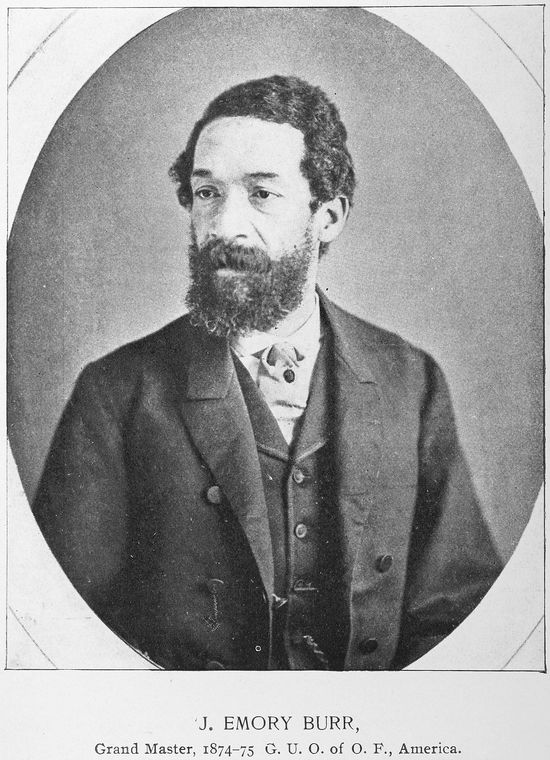
John Emory Burr, son of John Pierre Burr

In 1817, Burr married Hester Elizabeth ("Hetty") Emory at African Episcopal Church of St. Thomas in Philadelphia.

Hetty Burr was the co-founder (with Hetty Reckless) of the Moral Reform Retreat, Philadelphia's first shelter for African American women who were "victims of vice". Hetty also worked in business, having an employment office, and by 1860 was a dressmaker together with her unmarried daughters Elizabeth and Louisa.

John and Hetty Burr had at least nine children, including John Emory, Julia Matilda, David, Edward, Martin, Elizabeth, and Louisa. Edward and Martin both worked as carpenters. The family shared a commitment to the antislavery struggle.

John Emory Burr became a barber like his father, and was a Grand Master of the Grand United Order of Odd Fellows in America, a fraternal organization. He was also President of the Young Men's Union Literary Association of Philadelphia.

According to the Philadelphia Preservation Alliance, the Burr house was at Fifth and Spruce Streets, in the Society Hill area of the city. A Burr descendant places the home instead at Fifth and Locust (then Prune) Streets.

== Legacy ==
He aided many refugees from slavery on the Underground Railroad. Together with his wife and some of their children, he was active in fraternal organizations that worked for education, charity and civil rights for the African-American community.

His descendants Mable Burr Cornish and Louella Burr Mitchell Allen saved and collected documentation, photos, and oral histories that recount his period, the First African Episcopal Church of St. Thomas, and the achievements of him and his family. In 2005, the Aaron Burr Association welcomed them into the descendant family. The documents were shared with the Aaron Burr Association and historical societies, to ensure their preservation.

In 2018, Burr and his sister Louisa were formally acknowledged by the Aaron Burr Association as the children of Aaron Burr after a DNA test showed a familial link between descendants of John Pierre and Aaron Burr. In 2019, a new headstone was unveiled in Eden Cemetery, identifying John Pierre Burr as a "Champion of justice and freedom, conductor on the Underground railroad".

== See also ==
- Haitian emigration
