= Hester "Hetty" Burr =

- Born: Hester Elizabeth Emery; 1796
- Died: 1862 (aged 65–66)
- Resting place: Eden Cemetery
- Occupations: Abolitionist, clubwoman
- Known for: Abolitionism
- Spouse: John Pierre Burr
- Children: 10
- Parent(s): Sarah Emery; John Emery

Hester "Hetty" Elizabeth Burr (née Emery) (c.1796-1862) was an abolitionist and clubwoman in early America.

== Biography ==
Hester Emery was born to Sarah Emery and John Emery, a free Black man who served as a private in Pennsylvania's Fifth Regiment during the Revolutionary War. Hetty was born in about 1796. Her father died on January 19, 1809, when Hetty was about fourteen.

Hetty Emery was a dressmaker or hairdresser by trade.

On May 15, 1817, Hetty married John Pierre Burr at African Episcopal Church of St. Thomas. They had ten children together. The Burrs hid self-liberating slaves in their Philadelphia home, in their attic, a cave in the cellar, and a deep hole in the backyard at night. The runaways remained at the Burr home until John Pierre could safely transport them to their next conductor, who brought them to meet with Lucretia Mott and to Canada.

In 1831, Burr was a founding member of the Colored Female Free Produce Society, serving as the organization's treasurer. This organization promoted purchasing goods produced by free labor.

In 1833, Hetty Burr, along with twenty-eight abolitionist women, co-organized the Philadelphia Female Anti-Slavery Society after being denied membership to the American Anti-Slavery Society. In 1838, the Female Vigilant Association was founded, with Burr as a member, as an auxiliary to the Vigilant Association of Philadelphia, an underground railroad organization led by black Philadelphians. The Female Vigilant Association raised money to clothe, feed, and shelter runaways.

Burr attended the Women's Anti-Slavery Conventions in 1838 and 1839, serving on the convention's business committee. and was friends with abolitionists Sarah Moore Grimké and Angelina Grimké.

In January 1831, Burr became a founding member of the Gilbert Lyceum, an intellectual society unique in that it had both male and female members. Other founding members included Joseph Cassey, Sarah Mapps Douglass, Grace Douglass, and Harriet Purvis Jr. She also was president of one of Philadelphia's female literary societies.

In 1845, Hetty Burr, with Hetty Reckless, founded the Moral Reform Retreat, which helped "colored girls and women of the lowest and most destitute class." The Moral Reform Retreat housed nearly two hundred women, with an average stay of six weeks. Along with housing, the Moral Reform Retreat provided skill-building and education.

In 1849, Burr co-founded the Woman's Association of Philadelphia.

Burr died around 1862.
