= Charles Henry Warren =

American politician

Charles Henry Warren (September 29, 1798—June 29, 1874) was a Massachusetts attorney, politician and judge who served as President of the Massachusetts Senate in 1853.

== Biography ==
Warren was born in Plymouth, Massachusetts on September 29, 1798, the son of Henry and Mary (Winslow) Warren. He was a descendant of the prominent Warren and Winslow families, and his paternal grandparents were James Warren and Mercy Otis Warren. He attended the local schools and Sandwich Academy. Warren graduated from Harvard University in 1817, studied law with Joshua Thomas in Plymouth and Levi Lincoln Jr. in Worcester, and was admitted to the bar.

He settled in New Bedford, where he practiced law in partnership with Lemuel Williams, and later with Thomas Dawes Eliot.

Warren married Abby Burr Hedge of Plymouth on December 27, 1825.

From 1832 to 1839 Warren was District Attorney for the five southern counties of Massachusetts. In 1839 he was appointed Judge of the Common Pleas Court, and he served until 1844.

After leaving the bench, Warren moved to Boston and practiced law with Augustus H. Fiske and Benjamin Rand. In 1846 he became President of the Boston and Providence Railroad, a position in which he served until 1867.

In 1851 Warren was elected to the Massachusetts Senate as a Whig, and in 1853 he succeeded Henry Wilson as Senate President.

In 1871 Warren retired and returned to Plymouth. He died in Plymouth on June 29, 1874, and was entombed in the family vault at Burial Hill in Plymouth.
