= Mary E. Webb =

American actress and dramatic reader (1828–1859)

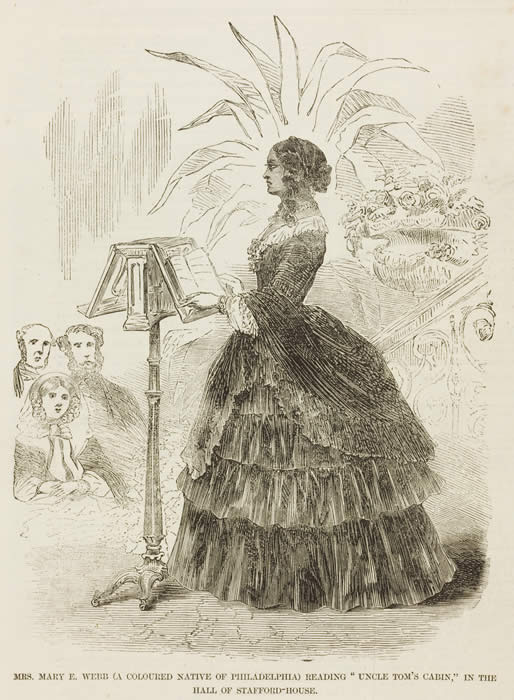
- Engraved newspaper illustration of Webb performing a dramatic reading in London, 1856
- Born: 1828; New Bedford, Massachusetts, US
- Died: June 17, 1859 (aged 30–31); Jamaica
- Occupations: Actress; orator
- Spouse: Frank J. Webb

Mary Espartero Webb (1828 – June 17, 1859) was an American actress and orator known for her dramatic readings of poetry and literature. She toured the northern United States and performed in Europe as a protégée of Harriet Beecher Stowe.

== Early life and family ==
Mary E. Webb was born in New Bedford, Massachusetts, three weeks after her mother succeeded in escaping there from slavery in Virginia. Her father, who was described as "a Spanish gentleman of wealth [who] had made many efforts to purchase the freedom of her mother", provided financial support for Webb until age 6 or 7. Through her mother's efforts, Webb was admitted to a school where her education included poetry and dramatic literature, and developed a talent for performance.

In 1845, at the age of 17, she married Frank J. Webb (1828–1894), who had been born into Philadelphia's community of free African Americans. His maternal grandfather, according to the family's oral history, was former U.S. Vice President Aaron Burr.

Frank Webb initially worked as a commercial artist, but would become known as a novelist, poet, and essayist. His novel, The Garies and Their Friends (1857), was the second novel by an African American to be published, and the first to portray the daily lives of free blacks in the North.

== Performance career ==
In Philadelphia, Mary Webb undertook voice training with a professor of elocution. She made her public debut on April 19, 1855, in the Assembly Rooms in Philadelphia, "before an audience containing a larger number of professional critics than had ever been before assembled in that city," and received unanimously favorable reviews. She soon gained renown for her dramatic readings of works by Shakespeare, Henry Wadsworth Longfellow, and Philip Sheridan.

In late 1855 and 1856, Webb toured New England, where she attracted the attention of Harriet Beecher Stowe and other prominent literary abolitionists. Stowe was so impressed by Webb's readings that she acted as her patron, adapting scenes from her bestselling novel Uncle Tom's Cabin expressly for Mary Webb's performance. One of her performances of Uncle Tom was attended by Longfellow, who wrote, "A striking scene, this Cleopatra with a white wreath in her dark hair, and a sweet, musical voice, reading to a great, unimpassioned, immovable Boston audience."

Stowe then helped to arrange a transatlantic tour for the Webbs, and provided a letter of introduction which included her own praise and a postscript that Longfellow had been "much pleased with Mrs. Webb's reading of his new poem Hiawatha". The Webbs traveled to England in 1856, where Mary's dramatic readings garnered further acclaim and the couple received a warm welcome from many British nobles.

Hoping to perform at Charles Dickens's seasonal theatre in Stafford House, Mary Webb had an interview with the novelist's wife, Catherine Dickens, at Gravesend, Kent in early April 1857. While moved by Catherine's description of Webb's "modesty" and "consumptive" state of ill health, Dickens reacted unfavorably to the idea of assisting the "poor woman" further on her reading tour, stating to the Earl of Carlisle in a letter of 15 April 1857, "I myself for example am the meekest of men, and in abhorrence of Slavery yield to no human creature—and yet I dont [sic] admit the sequence that I want Uncle Tom (or Aunt Tomasina) to expound King Lear to me. And I believe my case to be the case of thousands." Laura Korobkin interprets Dickens's dismissal of Webb, an educated African American woman, as evidence of racial and social anxiety regarding his own status.

In the wake of the Webbs' visit to England, the London firm of G. Routledge and Company published Frank Webb's first and only novel, The Garies and Their Friends, which was published with a preface by Stowe.

== Illness and death ==
The international tour had taken a severe toll on Mary Webb's health, and on the advice of physicians who recommended a warmer climate, the Webbs made an extended visit to Cannes in 1857–1858. The Webbs then relocated in 1858 to Kingston, Jamaica, where Frank's British friends secured him a job with the postal service.

Mary Webb died of tuberculosis in Jamaica on June 17, 1859. After her death, Frank Webb lived in Jamaica for over ten years, from 1858 to 1869, and remarried there before returning to the United States.

== See also ==
- Abolitionism in New Bedford, Massachusetts
