= Lemuel Williams Jr. =

American lawyer (1782–1869)

Lemuel Williams (June 5, 1782 – November 16, 1869) was an American lawyer and politician who served in the Massachusetts General Court and was a Collector for the United States Customs District of New Bedford and the Port of Boston.

== Early life ==
Williams was born on June 5, 1782, in New Bedford, Massachusetts (then part of Dartmouth, Massachusetts) to Lemuel Williams Sr. and Rebecca (Otis) Williams. He graduated from Brown University in 1804 and studied law at the Litchfield Law School. He was admitted to the bar in 1808.

== Legal career ==
Williams practiced law in New Bedford with Charles Henry Warren. After 30 years in New Bedford, Williams moved to Lowell, Massachusetts, however, he stayed for only two years. In 1840 he moved to Cambridge, Massachusetts, and opened a law office in Boston. In 1848 he moved to Worcester, Massachusetts. He retired in 1852.

== Politics ==
Williams was a member of the Massachusetts House of Representatives from 1819 to 1823. In 1820 he played a large role in passing legislation to create Massachusetts' Court of Common Pleas. He was a candidate for Speaker of the House in 1822 and finished third behind Luther Lawrence and Nathaniel Silsbee. In 1827, Williams served in the Massachusetts Senate.

Williams was a longtime friend and supporter of John C. Calhoun. Once Andrew Jackson's victory in the 1828 United States presidential election became certain, Williams publicly claimed Calhoun's friendship and joined the Jacksonians. After taking office, Jackson removed Russell Freeman from the office of Collector of Customs of New Bedford and, after Francis Baylies declined the job, appointed Williams to the position. During the campaign for the appointment, Williams and Freeman came to blows on the street. On February 17, 1830, Williams' nomination was rejected by the United States Senate 11 to 34. However, the following day Senator John Tyler moved that the vote be reconsidered and on March 8, 1830, he was confirmed by a vote of 26 to 20. Williams served as collector for 8 years. The New Bedford Customhouse was constructed during Williams's time in office.

From 1844 to 1845, Williams served as collector of customs at the port of Boston.

In 1850, Williams condemned Daniel Webster's "Seventh of March" speech and defended slavery on biblical grounds.

== Later life ==
After retiring, Williams remained in Worcester, where he died on November 16, 1869.

Government offices
Preceded by Russell Freeman	Collector for United States Customs District of New Bedford; 1829–1837	Succeeded by Robert S. Smith
Preceded by Robert Rantoul Jr.	Collector of Customs for the Port of Boston; 1844–1845	Succeeded by Marcus Morton
