= United States Customs District of New Bedford =

The United States Customs District of New Bedford was an administrative area for the collection of import duties on foreign goods that entered the United States by ship at the port of New Bedford, Massachusetts. Established in 1789, it ceased to be an independent district in 1913, but continues to operate as a port of entry.

== History ==
In 1789, New Bedford was chosen to be the administrative center of the Tenth U.S. Customs District. Colonel Edward Pope was chosen to be the district's first collector. The district consisted of the ports of New Bedford, Fairhaven, Rochester, Wareham, Westport, and Dartmouth.

By 1825, New Bedford had surpassed Nantucket as the capital of the whaling industry, a distinction it would hold for much of the nineteenth century. When New Bedford's whaling fleet was at its peak, the customs district was the fourth largest in the United States (after New York, Boston, and New Orleans) and saw an average of 450 ships and issued an average of 3,000 protection papers a year. In 1832, due to New Bedford's status as a major U.S. port, Congress appropriated $15,000 for the construction of a custom house in New Bedford. Architect Robert Mills was chosen to design the building and Seth and William Ingalls were hired as contractors. New Bedford's Customhouse was completed in 1836 at a cost of $32,000. Although the whaling industry declined in the early 20th century, the customs district still remained profitable through the collection of duties on mill machinery imported from England.

In one of the final acts of his presidency, William Howard Taft consolidated the nation's 165 customs districts into 49. All of Massachusetts' customs districts were combined into a single district. The New Bedford office would remain open, but the position of Collector would be eliminated and a Deputy Collector who reported to Boston would be put in charge. The elimination of the New Bedford district was opposed locally, as the elimination of the position of Collector meant that there would no longer be a Customs official who would actively work to have goods imported through New Bedford (the Collector received a portion of the fees collected in the district). While Taft was still considering the redistricting plan, Mayor Charles S. Ashley attended a hearing at the White House to speak out against the Customs consolidation plan. The consolidation act took effect on July 1, 1913.

Today, the New Bedford office covers an area stretching from Plymouth in the north to Martha's Vineyard and Nantucket in the south and west to east from Fall River, Massachusetts to Provincetown, Massachusetts. This area includes all of Cape Cod. The office handles duty collection and customs clearances for foreign cargo ships, cruise ships, private vessels, and airplanes that arrive into the port of entry.

== Collector ==
The position of collector was appointed by the President, subject to confirmation by the Senate. From 1820 onward, collectors were limited to four-year commissions, at the end of which they needed to be reappointed by the President. They could also be removed from office at any time at the pleasure of the President.

| Name | Entered office | Left office | First Appointed By | Notes |
|---|---|---|---|---|
| Edward Pope | 1789 | 1801 | George Washington | Namesake of Pope's Island in New Bedford. |
| Isaiah Weston | 1801 | 1814 | Thomas Jefferson | |
| John Hawes | 1814 | 1823 | James Madison | |
| Russell Freeman | 1823 | 1829 | James Monroe | Uncle of Collector Charles B. H. Fessenden. |
| Lemuel Williams Jr. | 1829 | 1838 | Andrew Jackson | Got into a physical altercation with Russell Freeman when the two were up for the position. The Custom House was constructed and opened during his tenure. |
| Robert S. Smith | 1838 | 1841 | Martin Van Buren | Left office due to issues involving his personal finances. |
| William H. Allen | 1841 | 1843 | William Henry Harrison | A member of the Whig Party, Allen was asked to resign by Democratic President John Tyler. Father of Collector John A. P. Allen. |
| Rodney French | 1843 | 1843 | John Tyler | Was not confirmed by the United States Senate. |
| Joseph T. Adams | 1843 | 1849 | John Tyler | Appointment secured by Josiah Sturgis, friend of John Tyler's son, Robert. |
| William T. Russell | 1849 | 1853 | Zachary Taylor | |
| Charles B. H. Fessenden | 1853 | 1861 | Franklin Pierce | |
| Lawrence Grinnell | 1861 | 1870 | Abraham Lincoln | |
| John A. P. Allen | 1870 | 1886 | Ulysses S. Grant | |
| Weston Howland | 1886 | 1891 | Grover Cleveland | |
| James Taylor | 1891 | 1895 | Benjamin Harrison | |
| Zephaniah W. Pease | 1895 | 1900 | Grover Cleveland | |
| George F. Bartlett | 1900 | 1905 | William McKinley | |
| Rufus A. Soule | 1905 | 1912 | Theodore Roosevelt | Died in office. Position abolished on July 1, 1913. |
