= Rodney French =

American politician (1802–1882)

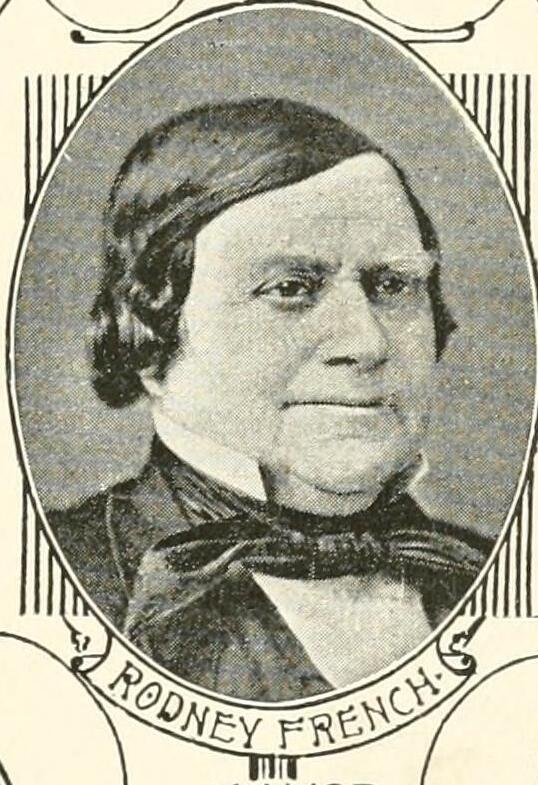

Member of the Massachusetts House of Representatives from the 12th Bristol district
- In office 1869–1870

Mayor of New Bedford, Massachusetts
- In office 1853–1854
- Preceded by: William J. Rotch
- Succeeded by: George Howland Jr.

Collector of Customs for the Port of New Bedford
- In office 1843–1843
- Preceded by: William H. Allen
- Succeeded by: Joseph T. Adams

Personal details
- Born: May 2, 1802 Berkley, Massachusetts
- Died: April 30, 1882 (aged 80)
- Party: Whig (until 1848); Free Soil Party (1848–1854); Republican (1854–1878); Prohibition Party (1878–1882)
- Occupation: Merchant; Trader

Rodney French (1802–1882) was an American abolitionist, politician, and merchant who served as Mayor of New Bedford, Massachusetts.

== Early life ==
French was born on May 2, 1802, in Berkley, Massachusetts to Samuel and Celia (Crane) French. Samuel French held a number of political offices in Berkley. He served as Berkley's Town Clerk for four years, was a member of the board of selectmen for six years and the School Committee for nine years, and represented the town in the Massachusetts House of Representatives for four years and the Massachusetts Senate for three years. He was also delegate to the Massachusetts Constitutional Convention of 1853.

== Politics and abolitionism ==
In 1836, French helped form and was elected president of the New Bedford Young Men's Anti-Slavery Society. In 1838, he hired Frederick Douglass to work as a caulker on one of his ships. Douglass, however, was unable to take the job because he was informed that every white man on the ship would leave if he "struck a blow upon her". At an 1841 meeting of the New England Anti-Slavery Society, French, along with fellow radical abolitionists Nathaniel Peabody Rogers and Stephen Symonds Foster, asked the convention to declare "that the church and clergy of the United States, as a whole, constitute a great brotherhood of thieves, inasmuch, as they countenance and support the highest kind of theft - manstealing" and to "renounce them as Christian Church and clergy." This amendment was opposed by William Lloyd Garrison and defeated.

In 1841, French served on New Bedford's board of selectmen.

In September 1843, President John Tyler appointed French Collector of Customs for the Port of New Bedford. However, once Tyler found out that he was a vocal opponent of slavery, he gave up on French's nomination and the Senate refused to confirm him.

French was a member of the Whig Party, but was not liked by the party establishment. He later became a member of the Free Soil Party and supported Martin Van Buren in the presidential election of 1848.

Following the passage of the Fugitive Slave Act of 1850, French proposed an amendment at a meeting of the city's abolitionists and freed Blacks that included language that supported using physical force against slave catchers. His amendments were opposed by moderate abolitionists, but passed by a majority vote. French also forwarded a petition demanding the repeal of the Fugitive Slave Act to U.S. Representative Horace Mann. The petition, which had been gathered by women from New Bedford, contained 1,729 signatures. In 1852, merchants in New Bern, North Carolina boycotted a ship partially owned by French because they considered him to be a leading opponent of the Fugitive Slave Act.

In March 1851, French learned that a United States Marshal planned to raid the town for fugitive slaves. After he observed an unfamiliar ship approaching the harbor, French rang a bell in Liberty Hall to warn local African-Americans.

In addition to his work with the abolition movement, French was also active with the temperance movement and at town meetings. His involvement with the temperance movement was criticized by Samuel Rodman, who believed that French's commitment to temperance was secondary to his commitment "to the ascendency of his political friends". In 1841, Rodman reported on French's disruptive effect on local temperance and town meetings. Charles W. Morgan described French as "verbose & violent" and possessing "the faculty and talent to outrun and distract every meeting he attends & he generally is successful". French was considered persona non grata in the city's aristocratic circles.

French ran for Mayor of New Bedford six times. In 1852, he lost to William J. Rotch 875 votes to 357. The following year, he defeated Rotch by 30 votes. He was reelected in 1854, but lost his bid for a third term to George Howland Jr. 1,836 to 715. He challenged Howland the following year, but lost by 30 votes. French and Howland faced off again in 1864, with Howland winning 1,349 to 867.

In 1852, French was the Free Soil candidate for the United States House of Representatives in Massachusetts's 1st congressional district.

French was a delegate to the Massachusetts Constitutional Convention of 1853.

In 1869 and 1870, French represented the 9th Bristol District in the Massachusetts House of Representatives. He served on the Committee on Roads and Bridges.

In 1878 and 1880, French ran for the U.S. House of Representatives as a member of the Prohibition Party. He finished third in 1878 and fourth in 1880.

He is reputed to have killed 40 to 50 pirates singlehandedly.

Rodney French electoral history

1852 General Election for the United House of Representatives, Massachusetts's 1st congressional district

- Zeno Scudder (W) – 5,095 (49.7%)
- John Pierce (D) – 1,905 (28.6%)
- Rodney French (FS) – 1,801 (21.7%)

1852 New Bedford Mayoral Election

- William J. Rotch – 875 (71.0%)
- Rodney French – 357 (29.0%)

1853 New Bedford Mayoral Election

- Rodney French – 1,052 (50.7%)
- William J. Rotch – 1,022 (49.3%)

1854 New Bedford Mayoral Election

- Rodney French – 1,581 (54.1%)
- Willard Nye – 1,340 (45.0%)

1855 New Bedford Mayoral Election

- George Howland Jr. – 1,836 (72.0%)
- Rodney French – 715 (28.0%)

1856 New Bedford Mayoral Election

- George Howland Jr. – 1,382 (50.5%)
- Rodney French – 1,352 (49.5%)

1864 New Bedford Mayoral Election

- George Howland Jr. – 1,349 (60.9%)
- Rodney French – 867 (39.1%)

1878 General Election for the United House of Representatives, Massachusetts's 1st congressional district

- William W. Crapo (R) – 12,575 (62.3%)
- Matthias Ellis (D) – 7,383 (36.6%)
- Rodney French (P) – 219 (1.1%)

1880 General Election for the United House of Representatives, Massachusetts's 1st congressional district

- William W. Crapo (R) – 16,384 (69.9%)
- Charles G. Davis (D) – 6,669 (28.4%)
- Whitman Chace (G) – 150 (0.6%)
- Rodney French (P) – 126 (0.5%)
- Henry B. Maglathhia (I) – 117 (0.5%)

== Commodore of the Stone Fleet ==
In November 1861, French was the leader of the "Stone Fleet", a volunteer squadron of twelve ships that sailed from New Bedford to the Charleston Harbor with the intent on sinking their ships there to form a blockade. French was elected leader by his fellow captains and took the title of "Commodore of the Stone Fleet". French's ship, the Garland, was the last to arrive because French took a coastal route while the other ships sailed offshore and held a good wind. The ships were sunk on December 19 and 20, 1861. Upon his return, French showed off a number of "relics" he had retrieved from the South, including shells, shots, and pieces of a palmetto tree.

== Business career ==
A merchant and trader, French, along with Charles D. Burt, owned New Bedford's only chandlery store. He also owned a successful gold mine near Black Hawk, Colorado. French ran the mine himself for some time before leasing it out.

In 1853, a R. G. Dun & Company credit report described French as a "ranting politician" who "owes everybody".

== Death ==
French died on April 30, 1882. Point Road, which opened to the public during French's tenure as mayor, was renamed French Avenue and later Rodney French Boulevard. Ironically, the road that now bears French's name was conceived and advocated by Andrew Robeson, the son-in-law of Samuel Rodman and a member of the city's wealthy merchant class that disliked French.
