= Lewis Temple (inventor) =

American abolitionist, blacksmith, and inventor (1800–1854)

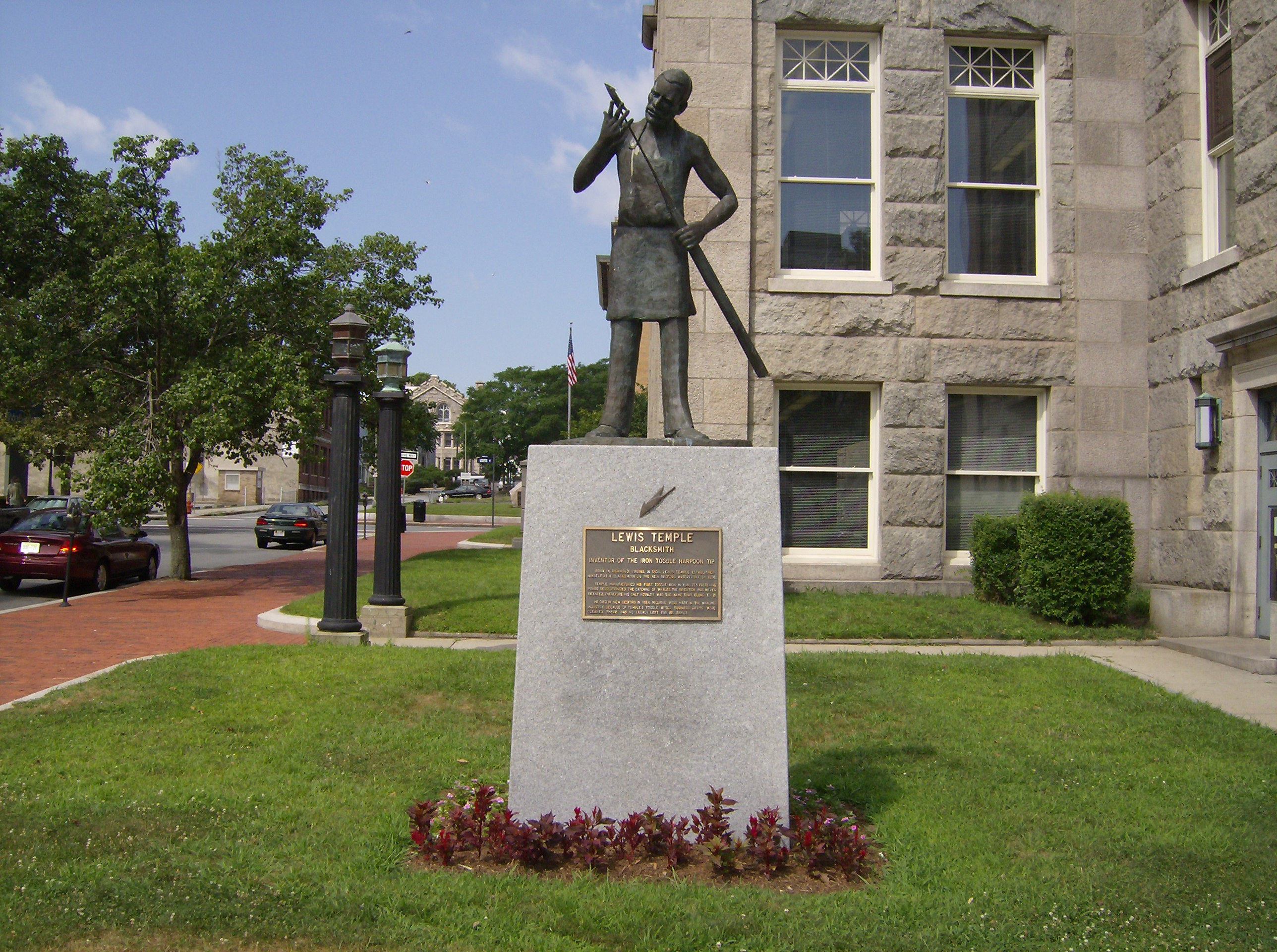
A statue of Lewis Temple in New Bedford, Massachusetts

Lewis Temple (1800 – 18 May 1854) was an American maker of items used in whaling, blacksmith, abolitionist, and inventor. He was born in slavery in Richmond, Virginia, and moved to the whaling village of New Bedford, Massachusetts during the 1820s, where he worked as a blacksmith. He married Mary Clark in 1829 and they had three children. He is best remembered for the invention of "Temple's Toggle" or "Temple's Iron" which was a harpoon toggle tip based upon Inuit and Native American harpoon tips brought back to New England by Whalers in 1835. After some trials, whalers took to the improved harpoon as it prevented the whale from pulling free. Temple never patented his invention which resulted in others copying his work and selling it as their own. Temple did live well enough to build a larger shop. Unfortunately, due to the negligence of a city construction worker, he fell and was injured. He sued the city and won two thousand dollars ($77,400 in 2025), which he never received. He died from his injuries in May 1854, aged 53. His profits from the invention went largely to paying off his debts.

== See also ==
- List of African-American inventors and scientists
- Abolitionism in New Bedford, Massachusetts
