= Southmoreland High School =

Coordinates: 40.1384°N 79.5925°W

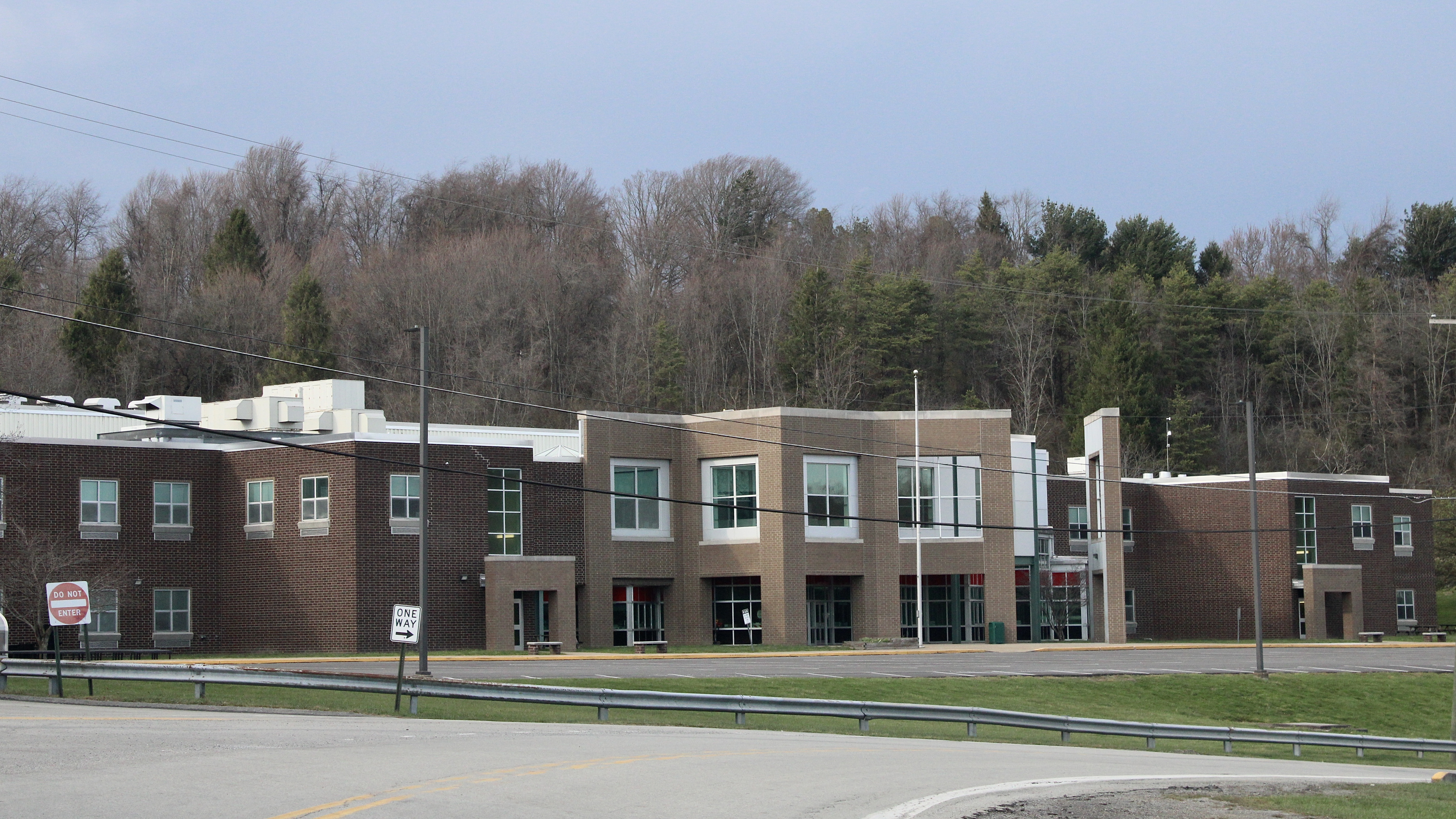
- Southmoreland Senior High School

Location
- 2351 Route 981; Alverton, Pennsylvania 15612

Information
- Type: Public
- Grades: 9–12
- Enrollment: 555 (2023–2024)
- Color
- Team name: Scotties
- Website: https://shs.southmoreland.net/

Southmoreland High School is located in East Huntingdon Township, Westmoreland County, Pennsylvania, 40 miles southeast of downtown Pittsburgh. It serves grades 9–12. The school is part of the Southmoreland School District, which covers East Huntingdon Township, Ruffs Dale, Alverton, Tarrs, Scottdale, Everson, and parts of Buckeye. The school is headed by Principal Mr. Daniel Krofcheck and Assistant Principal Mrs. Tracey Kuchar.

Advanced Placement courses are available for enrollment in the subjects of Calculus (AB), Precalculus, Chemistry, Physics 1, Physics 2, Biology, English Language and Composition, English Literature and Composition, United States Government and Politics, World History (Modern), Music Theory and Statistics.

Dual enrollment courses are available in the following subjects: English Literature, American Politics, Physics 1, and Calculus 1.

== History ==
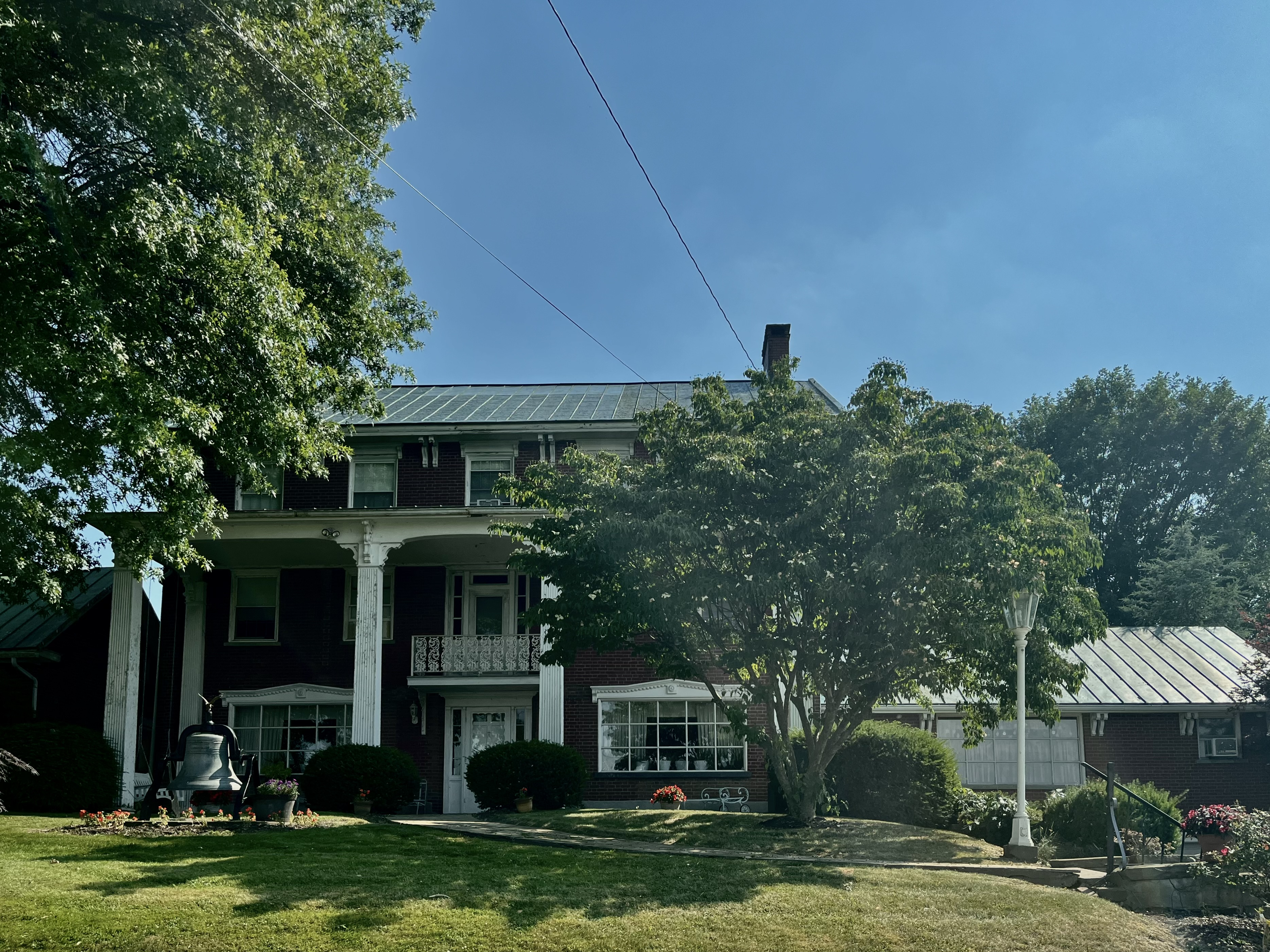
The original East Huntingdon school building from 1805.

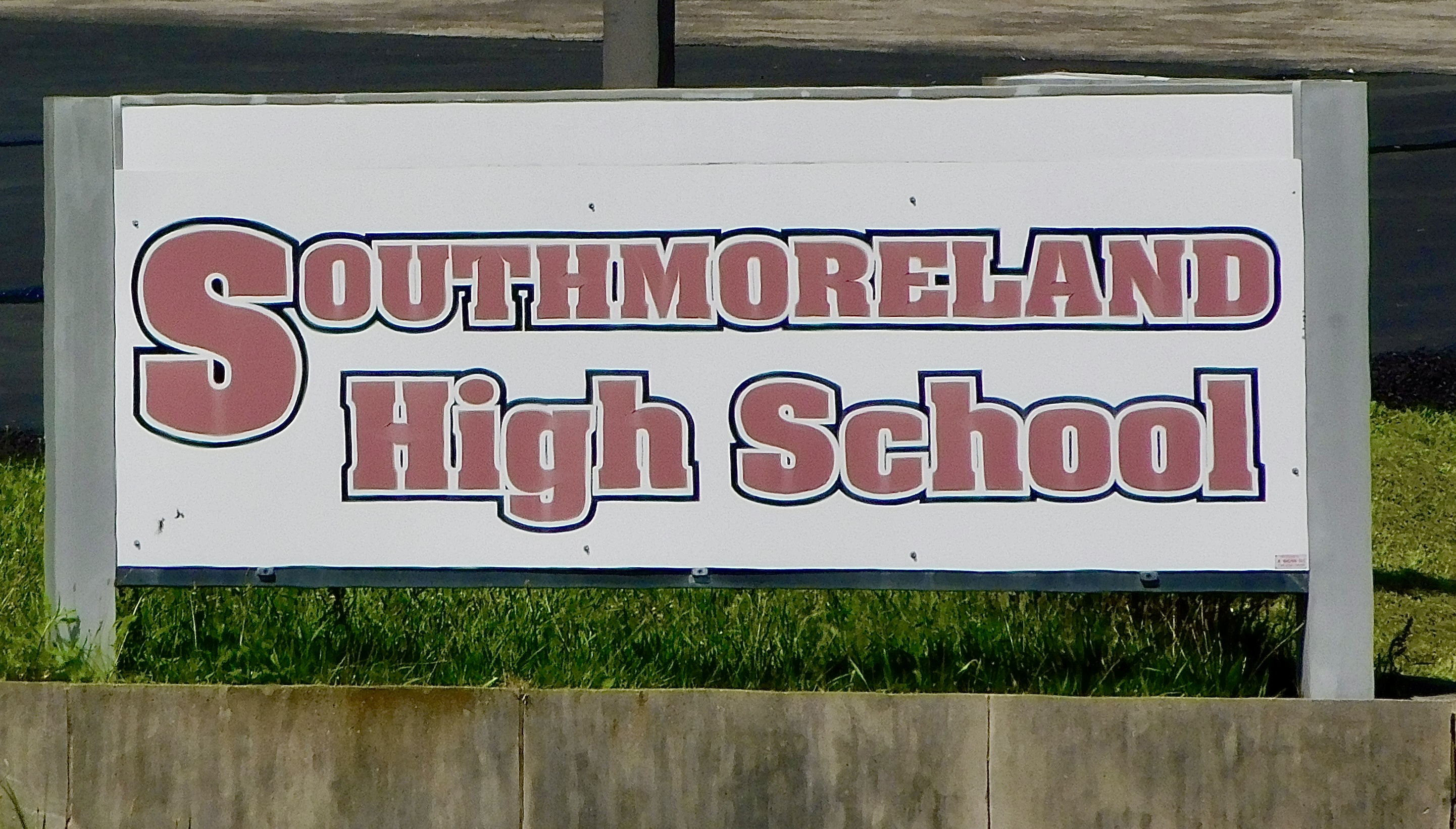
Sign located on PA-981 for Southmoreland High School (c. 1999)

In 1805, the first schoolhouse in East Huntingdon township was built adjacent from Gaut’s Dairy Farm in rural Scottdale, near Alverton. The school building’s creation led to the establishment of the area’s first school district. There were three teachers in the building, a German man known only as “Leighy”, John Selby and Peter Showalter. The first school board for the district was established on September 19, 1834. The district began to expand and several more buildings were added before being split into two districts; Scottdale School District and East Huntingdon School District.

Southmoreland High School was formed in the fall of 1964 with the merger of Scottdale Joint High School, located in Scottdale and East Huntingdon High School, located in Alverton. With the merger, Southmoreland encompassed 51 total miles with approximately 15,000 residents in the district.

The original Southmoreland building was on the site of the former East Huntingdon High School, where classes took place until the mid-1970s. In 1975, the newly constructed Southmoreland High School opened directly across from the former school, which became Southmoreland Junior High School. The original school building was demolished in 2010. The site of the former school was converted to a parking lot for Russ Grimm Field, dubbed Scotland Yard.

The high school building underwent renovations in the fall of 1999 to repair the then nearly 25 year-old building. In addition to necessary renovations, the school also received a new entrance way in the front of the building as well as building brand new band and chorus rooms in the rear of the building.

The school grew to prominence with its football team in the 1970s. Southmoreland linebacker Russ Grimm went on to play professional football for the Washington Redskins where he would become a three time Super Bowl champion and be inducted into the Pennsylvania Sports Hall of Fame in 2023.

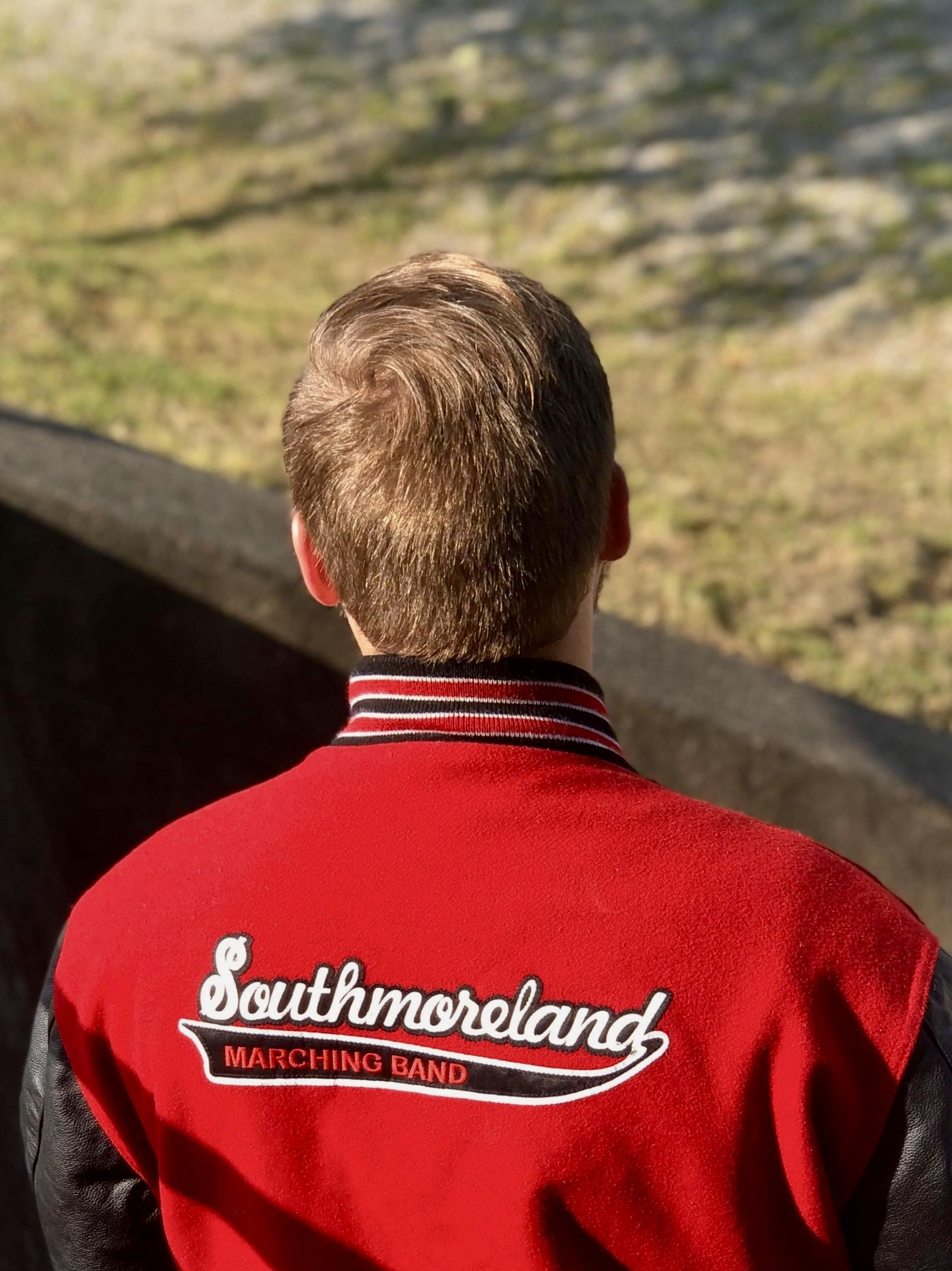
A student wearing a Southmoreland Marching Band letterman jacket.

In August 2013, Southmoreland's football field, Russ Grimm field, was destroyed in a flash flood. The base beneath the turf was eroded by the water, creating divots in the ground below the field which lifted the AstroTurf, causing the field to warp. In addition to this, a new stream subsequently formed on the field itself. Southmoreland played the remainder of the 2013 season at nearby California University of Pennsylvania's Adamson Stadium. A new field was unveiled ahead of the 2014 season.

Southmoreland's football team saw a resurgence in popularity during the 2021 season. During a 41–0 shutout victory against Derry Area High School, running back Lily Wasmund scored a touchdown in the final minutes of the game. This touchdown was the first to be scored by a female player in the 114-year history of the Western Pennsylvania Interscholastic Athletic League (WPIAL)

On August 28, 2018, after more heavy rain in the area, the presence of mildew and mold were discovered in two of the school's classrooms. High school students were not permitted inside the building for the entirety of the first week of the 2018-19 school year until the mold was eradicated the following week.

Southmoreland's theater program ceased operation with advent of the new school building in 1975. This was until spring 2018 when the program was reintroduced with the musical Cinderella. Since then, Southmoreland has had an active theater program with an annual spring musical. They have performed such productions as The Little Mermaid, Anything Goes and Mama Mia.

The school's marching band has participated in the Pennsylvania Interscholastic Marching Band Association (PIMBA) since 1996 where they compete in class single A. They have been PIMBA champions five times in 2001, 2017, 2021, 2022 and 2023.

=== Cardiac Hill ===
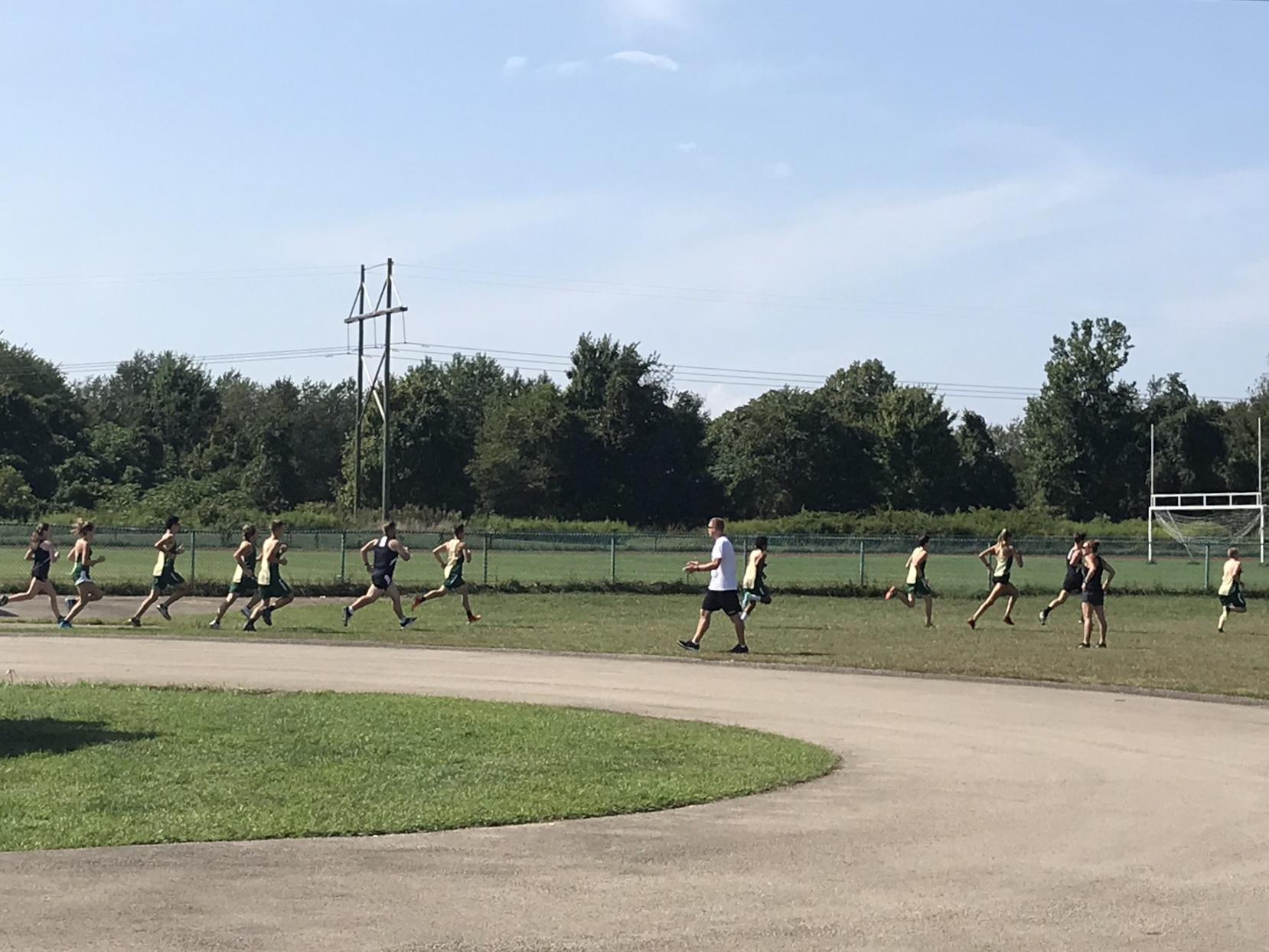
Southmoreland's cross country team in a meet against Belle Vernon Area High School on Cardiac Hill in 2019.

Unlike most other high school locations in the Fay-West area, Southmoreland has a separate space reserved for the school's track, cross country, baseball, and tennis teams, referred to as "Cardiac Hill". Established in July 1972, the hill runs from Southmoreland's softball field, located behind the Southmoreland Primary Center building, to the entrance of the school's athletic track directly behind the high school's student parking lot. Cardiac Hill is located on Scottie Pride Way, just off of Pennsylvania Route 981 and is entirely surrounded by farmland. The school's marching band, soccer team, and cheerleading squad also utilize Cardiac Hill as a practice field.

It received the nickname Cardiac Hill because of its distance and height. The distance from the base to the summit is 830 feet. In order to reach the school's athletic track from the softball field, the hill requires visitors to drive a quarter of a mile uphill on Scottie Pride Way.

In addition to the high school level sports played on Cardiac Hill, it is also where Southmoreland's youth football program plays its home games, as well as hosting the middle school level cross country, baseball and track and field teams.

Cardiac Hill has also hosted Southmoreland's graduation on several occasions.

=== Wall of Honor ===
Southmoreland's library had been converted into a student lounge dubbed the "student union" prior to the start of the 2023-24 school year On Veterans Day 2023, a wall in the student union was turned into a display to honor 223 veterans from the Scottdale/East Huntingdon area that attended Southmoreland High School. The Wall of Honor was created by students at the school. The display is currently in the process of becoming interactive.

=== Ron Frederick Memorial Youth Football Camp ===
Russ Grimm Field is where the Southmoreland Football team plays its home games. It is pictured here in 2026

After the retirement of previous head football coach Dave Keefer, the school made the decision to promote former assistant coach Ronald Frederick to the position on February 1, 2022. Frederick was a 1999 Southmoreland graduate and played college football for the University of Tulsa and California University of Pennsylvania. He returned to coach at Southmoreland in 2005 in their youth division. Frederick had served as the high school Scotties' assistant football coach for four years prior to his promotion, helping lead the team to a nearly undefeated season and playoff appearance at the conclusion of the 2019 season, breaking a 40 year playoff drought, the longest in the Western Pennsylvania Interscholastic Athletic League. However, Frederick died the following day from a heart attack at the age of 40. The head coach position was then filled by offensive coordinator and friend of Frederick's, Tim Bukowski on March 10, 2022.

In June 2022, Southmoreland created the Ronald Frederick Memorial Youth Football Camp to honor the memory of the would be head coach. The camp remains as an annual event led by Bukowski along with current high school students in order to condition young football players and is open to both boys and girls that attend Southmoreland Elementary and Middle Schools.

== 2010 fetus incident ==
On May 19, 2010, a janitor at Southmoreland had been doing routine cleaning of the school's stairwells when they discovered the presence of blood what was believed to be a human fetus. It was originally believed by state police to be aged between 7 and 9 weeks and was likely the result of a miscarriage. The fetus was examined by forensic pathologist Cyril Wecht, who determined that the fetus was actually a type of unspecified "vegetable matter".

== 2021 mask protest incident ==
In the wake of the COVID-19 pandemic, Southmoreland began to utilize zoom meetings in an effort to social distance. When in person meetings resumed in 2021, the school board voted 8-1 on the requirement for all board members to wear protective face coverings with the only dissenting vote being attributed to former school psychologist Dr. Catherine Fike.

Fike followed up the dissenting vote by attending the March school board meeting without a face covering. In addition to this, Fike reportedly presented a handwritten note addressed to the entirety of the board that outlined her refusal to follow the district's mask policy.

During the April 15, 2021 school board meeting, Fike thrusted Southmoreland into the national spotlight when she wore a paper bag over her head in protest of the district's mask policies. During the meeting, Fike equated wearing masks to "depriving us of our individual rights and freedoms."

As of June 2024, Fike remains on Southmoreland's school board. Her term will expire in December 2027.

== Notable alumni ==
- Sam Bair, Kent State All American track runner, placed third in the 1977 Pan-American Games for the 5000 meter run, class of 1965.
- B. Smith, model and restauranteur, class of 1967.
- David Trout, professional American football placekicker, class of 1976.
- Russ Grimm, professional American football player, 3x Super Bowl champion, class of 1977.
- Chris Shipley, tech analyst, class of 1980.
- D.J. Coffman, cartoonist and comic book author, class of 1994.
