= Southmoreland School District =

School district in Pennsylvania

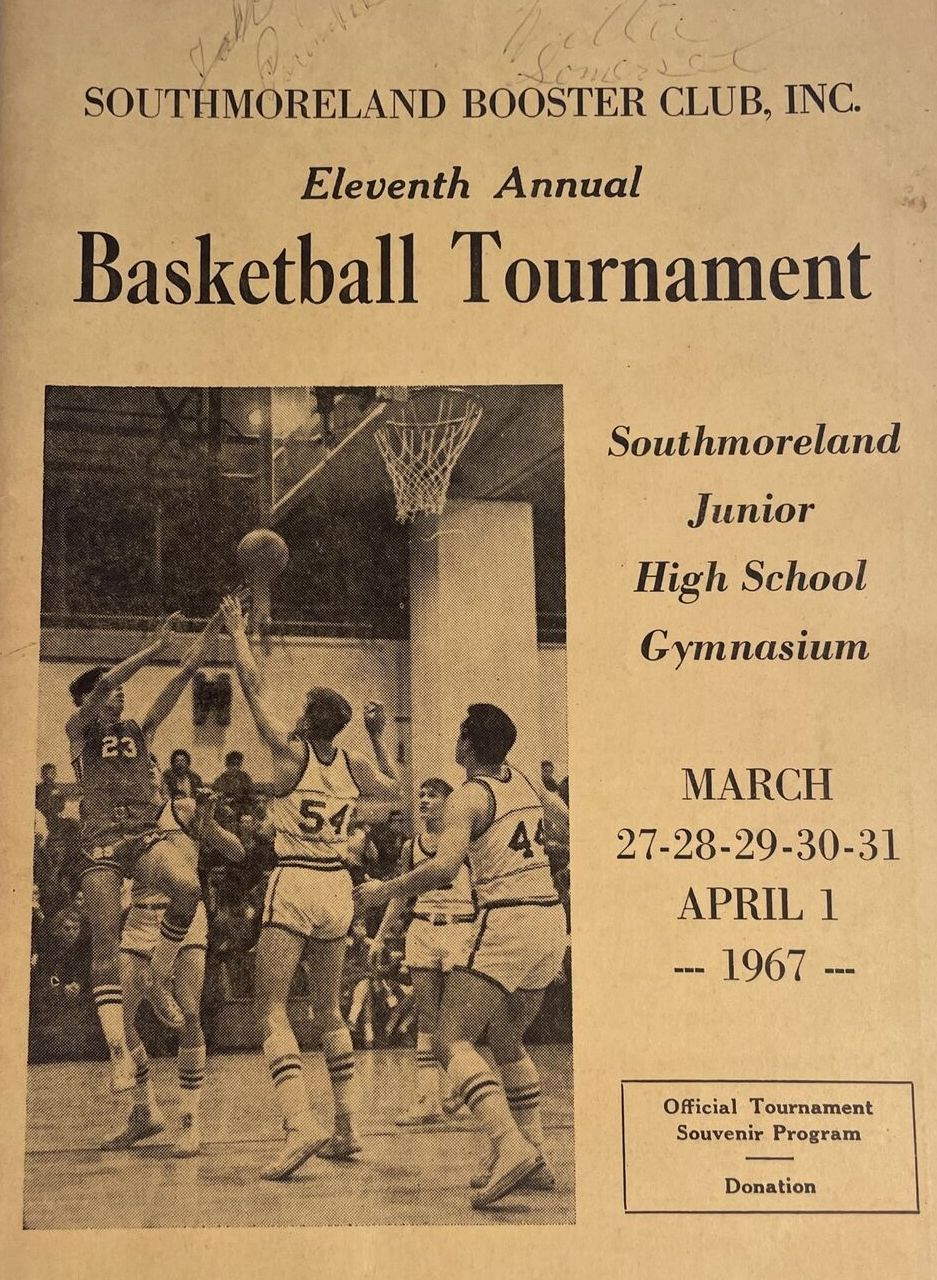
- Program for a Southmoreland basketball tournament in March, 1967
- 200 Scottie Way, Scottdale, Pennsylvania, U.S. Westmoreland and Fayette Counties

District information
- Type: Public
- Motto: "High Quality Learning for All."

Students and staff
- District mascot: Scotties
- Colors: Red and Black

Other information
- Website: www.southmoreland.net

Southmoreland School District is a small, suburban public school district located in northern Fayette County, Pennsylvania and southern Westmoreland County, Pennsylvania. The boroughs of Scottdale and Everson, as well as the townships of East Huntington and Upper Tyrone are within district boundaries. Southmoreland School District encompasses approximately 43 square miles. According to 2000 federal census data, it serves a resident population of 15,639. In 2009, the district residents’ per capita income was $15,876, while the median family income was $38,993. In the Commonwealth, the median family income was $49,501 and the United States median family income was $49,445, in 2010.

== History ==
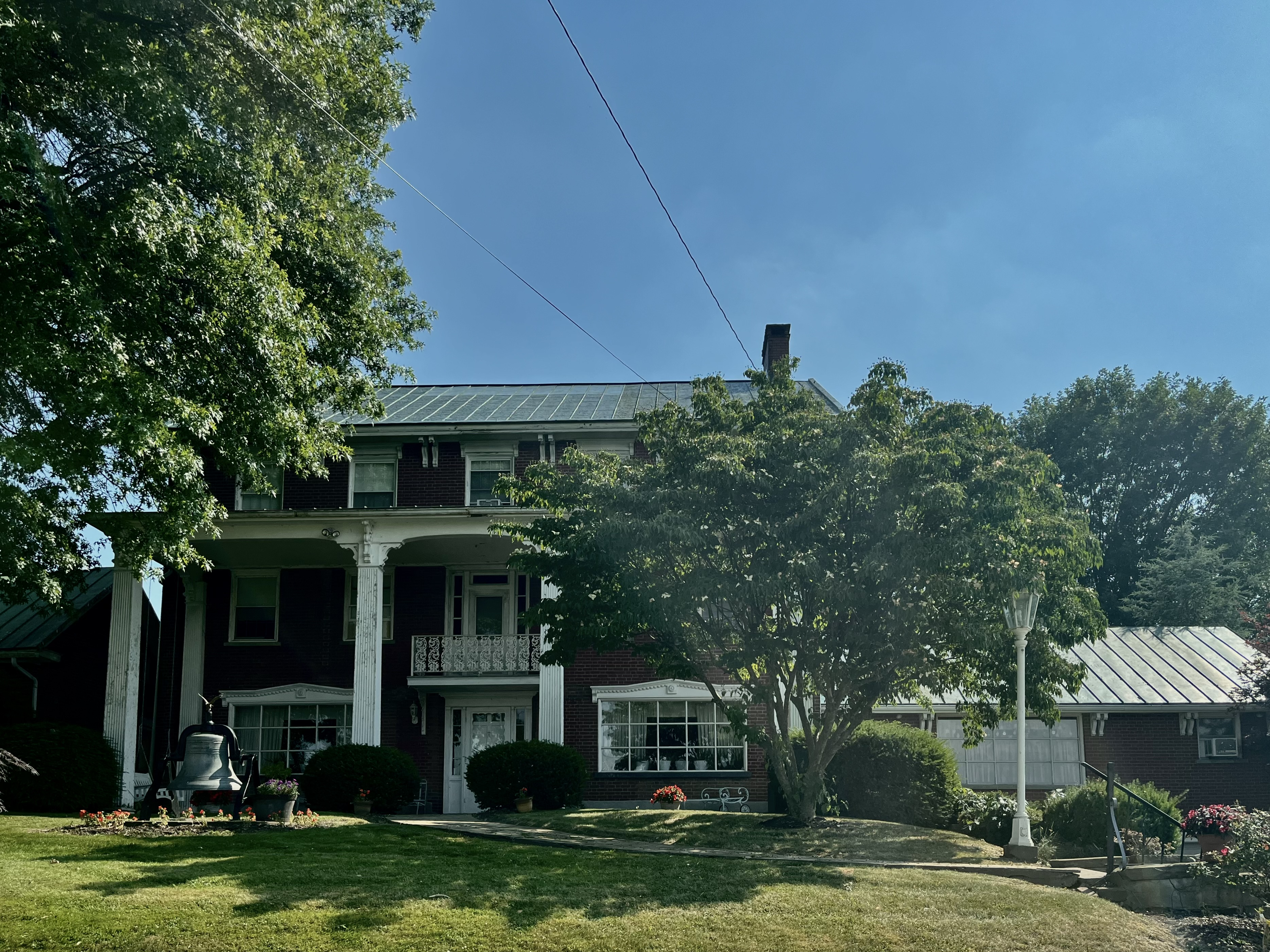
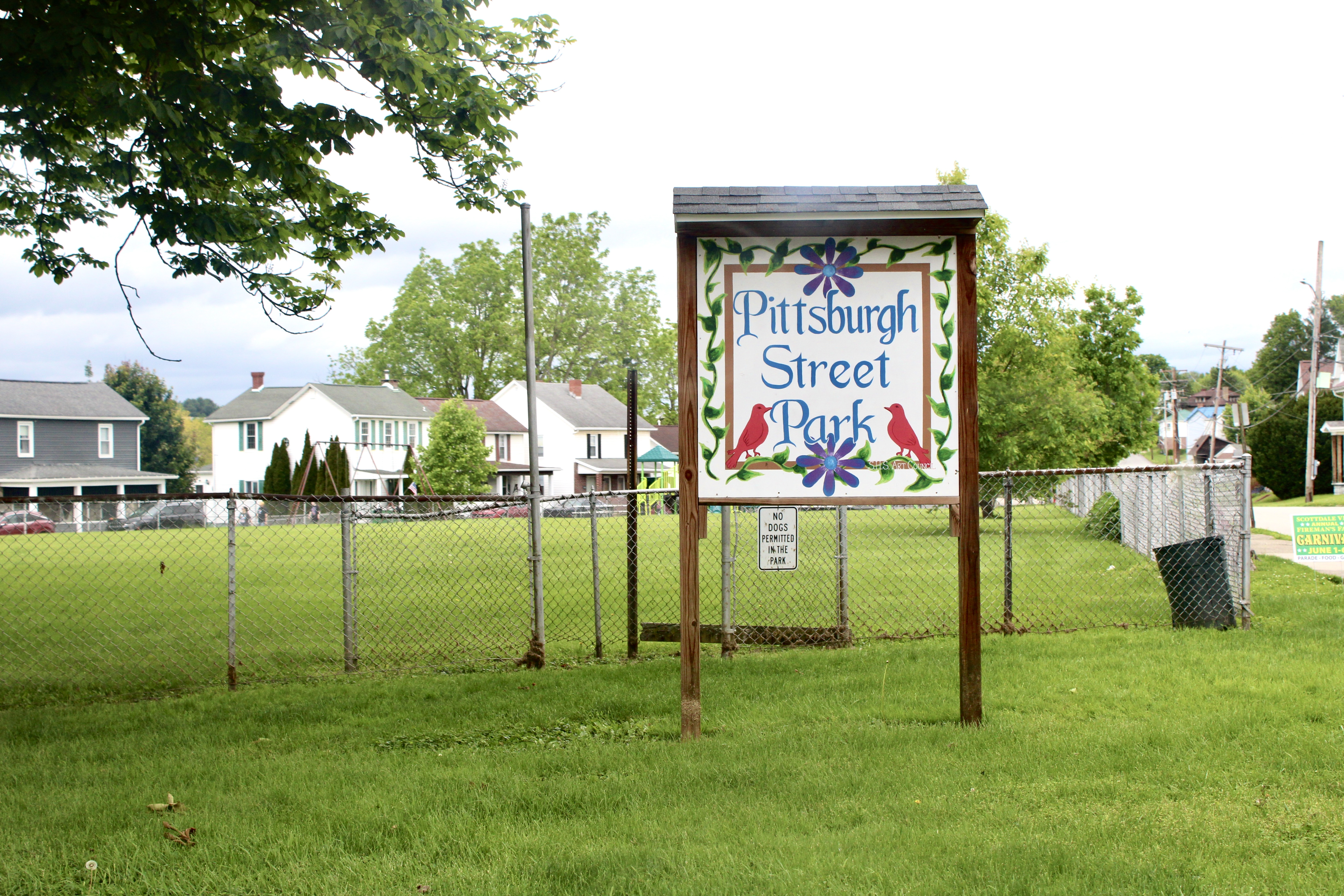
Original sites of the first East Huntingdon High School and Scottdale High School (now Pittsburgh Street Park)

In 1805, the first schoolhouse in East Huntingdon township was built adjacent from Gaut’s Dairy Farm in rural Scottdale, near Alverton. The school building’s creation led to the establishment of the area’s first school district. There were three teachers in the building, a German man known only as “Leighy”, John Selby and Peter Showalter. The first school board for the district was established on September 19, 1834. The district began to expand and several more buildings were added before being split into two districts; Scottdale School District and East Huntingdon School District.

=== Scottdale School District ===
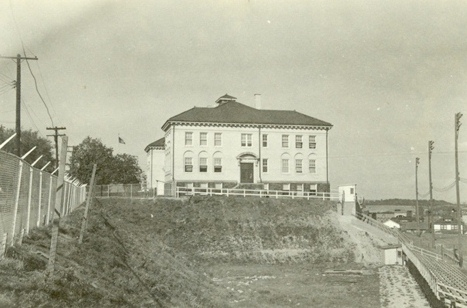
Scottdale High School, pictured in October 1949

After the borough of Scottdale was established in 1874, what is now known as the Scottdale Historic District, was exclusively part of the Scottdale school district. Much of rural Scottdale was place into other external school districts which include South Huntington (now Yough Area School District), Bullskin (now Connellsville School District) and East Huntingdon.

In 1878, Scottdale erected its first dedicated high school building, located on West Pittsburgh Street about a half-mile from downtown. In 1928, two more buildings were placed within the district, North and South grade schools.

The original high school building was vacated around 1900 following the construction of Scottdale High School on South Chestnut Street. The building on Pittsburgh street was utilized as a junior high school due to increasing enrollment before it was demolished in favor of a more recently constructed school building across from the high school. The building was demolished in 1901 and replaced by a new school building directly across the street the same year. With the advent of the new school building, Scottdale's student body became known as the "Scotties" and began using the Scottish Terrier mascot with white and blue colors to represent the district. A football field was constructed behind the school building leading to the school instituting sports teams for the first time.

By the 1952 school year, Scottdale High School began to be outgrown by the student body as well as merging with nearby Upper Tyrone School District, leading to a new building being developed. The new site, located North Chestnut Street, for the renamed Scottdale Joint High School was purchased on June 22, 1953. The building was first used for a Scotties basketball game in January 1958 with the school officially opening for instruction on September 3, 1958. The former high school building then became another grade school, referred to locally as Central Grade School.

=== East Huntingdon School District ===
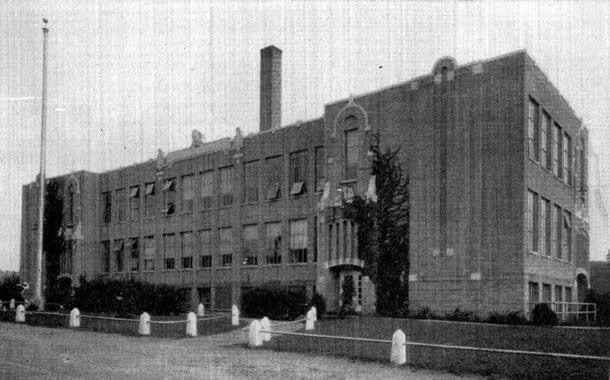
East Huntingdon High School building pictured in 1942

During this same period of time, the East Huntingdon Township School District opened its first high school building on Route 981 in Alverton. The building was constructed in 1924 and had few modifications throughout its history. The only significant change to the building was the addition of a Vo-tech program in the basement and an extension added in the fall of 1954.

In the early 1950s, the several school houses throughout Alverton and surrounding areas of Mayfield, Tarrs and Ruffsdale were consolidated into two elementary schools, Alverton and Ruffsdale Elementary.

East Huntingdon’s athletic department included football, basketball and wrestling teams. Sometime in the early 1940s, a marching band as well as cheerleaders were added to the district’s activities. At the time, East Huntingdon solely consisted of the school building on 981 with the football field directly behind the building. The school utilized red and black as their school colors and were represented by a bulldog mascot.

=== Consolidation of districts ===
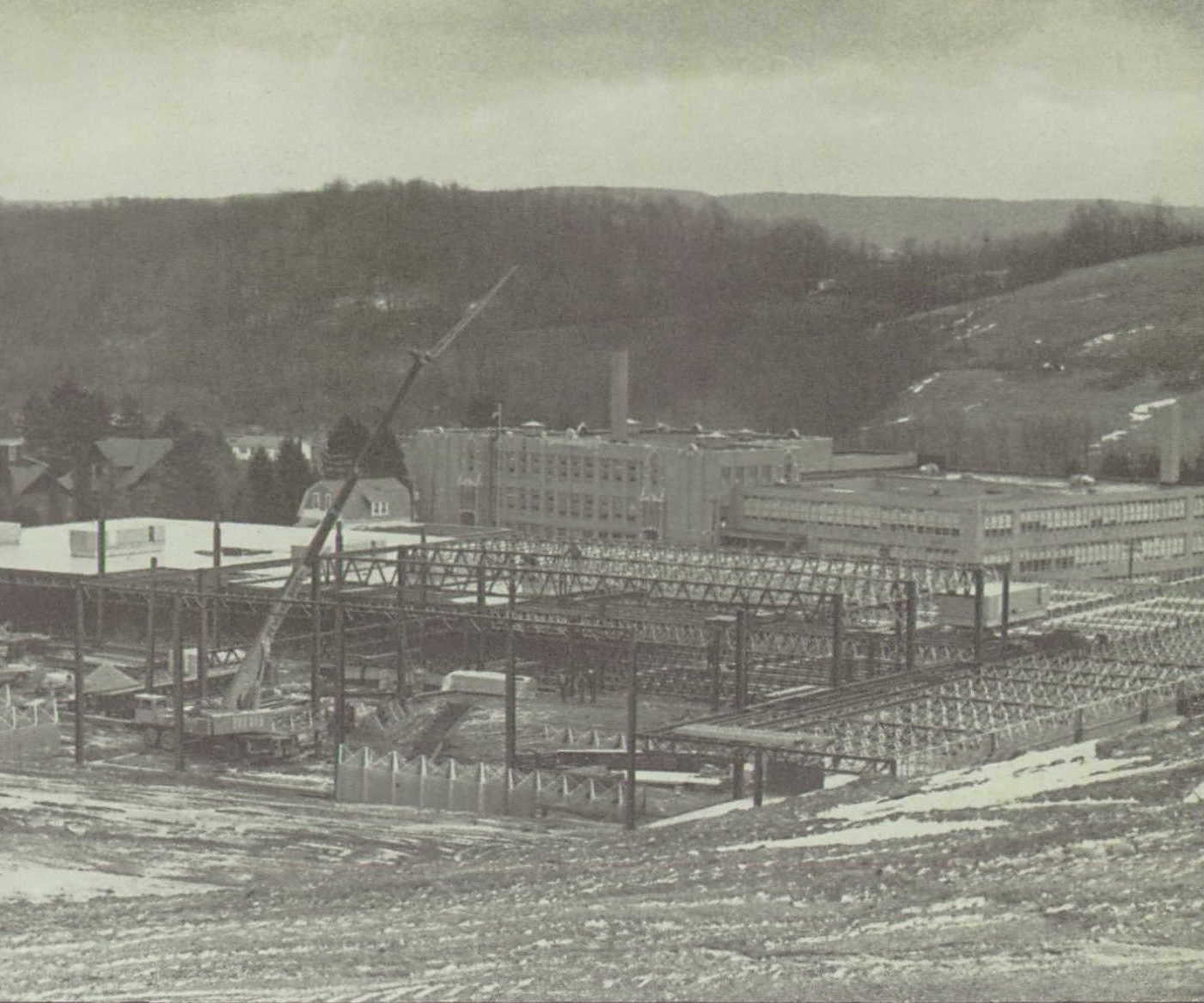
The present day Southmoreland High School being constructed in 1975

In the fall of 1964, the neighboring districts merged to form Southmoreland School District with students from Scottdale Joint High School now attending classes at Southmoreland High School in Alverton. The former Scottdale Joint High School building was renovated into Southmoreland Elementary and Middle School in 2010.

With the merger, Southmoreland encompassed 51 total miles with approximately 15,000 residents in the district.

The original Southmoreland building was on the site of the former East Huntingdon High School, where classes took place until the mid-1970s. In 1975, the newly constructed Southmoreland High School opened directly across from the former school, which became Southmoreland Junior High School. The original school building was demolished in 2010. The site of the former school was converted to a parking lot for Russ Grimm Field, dubbed Scotland Yard.

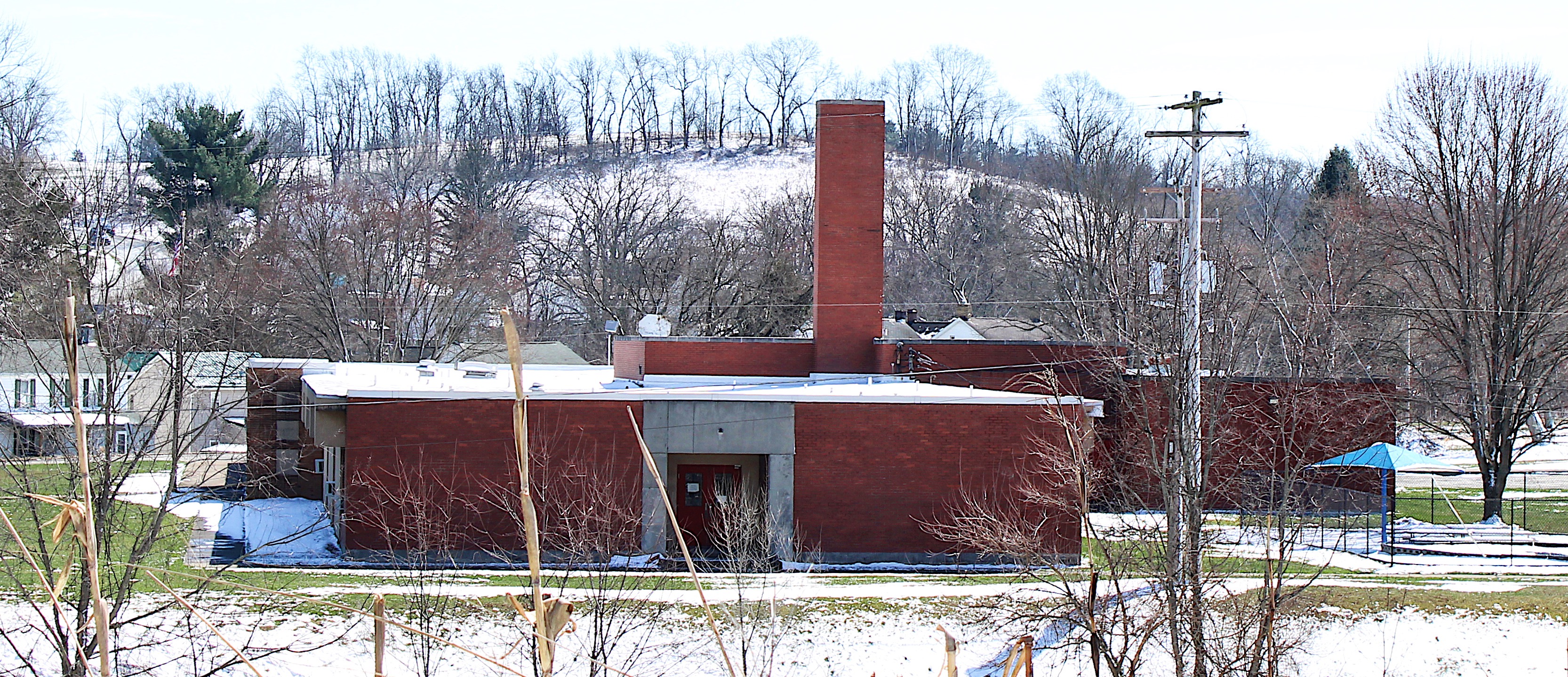
Former Ruffsdale Elementary School

The district operated three elementary schools, Scottdale, Alverton and Ruffsdale Elementary Schools, a junior high school and the high school building.

The high school building underwent renovations in the fall of 1999 to repair the then nearly 25 year-old building. In addition to necessary renovations, the school also received a new entrance way in the front of the building as well as building brand new band and chorus rooms in the rear of the building. The building has not had any major renovations since then.

In 2007, because of declining enrollment at Ruffs Dale Elementary, the building was proposed to be closed. The final school year for the building was held from fall 2008 through spring 2009. After the building was closed, students began attending Southmoreland Primary Center, located at the former Alverton Elementary school.

== Schools ==
School name	Grade Level	Street Address
Southmoreland Primary Center	Grades K-1	1431 Water Street; Alverton, Pennsylvania 15612
Southmoreland Elementary School	Grades 2-5	100 Scottie Way; Scottdale, Pennsylvania 15683
Southmoreland Middle School	Grades 6-8	200 Scottie Way; Scottdale, Pennsylvania 15683
Southmoreland High School	Grades 9-12	2351 Route 981; Alverton, Pennsylvania 15612

== Extracurriculars ==
The district offers a variety of clubs, activities and sports.

=== Sports Teams ===
Sport	Boys	Girls
Football	Class AA	
Baseball	Class AA	
Softball		Class AAA
Track and field	Class AAA	Class AAA
Basketball	Class AAA	Class AAA
Cross country	Class AA	Class AA
Tennis	Class AA	Class AA
Wrestling	Class AA	
Soccer	Class AA	Class AAA
Golf	Class AAAA	Class AAAA
Volleyball		Class AA
Marching band	Class A	Class A

== Vocational-Technical School ==
Students in grades 10 to 12 in the Southmoreland School District have the opportunity to attend the Central Westmoreland Career and Technology Center in New Stanton.
