= Scottdale, Pennsylvania =

Borough in Pennsylvania, US

- Borough
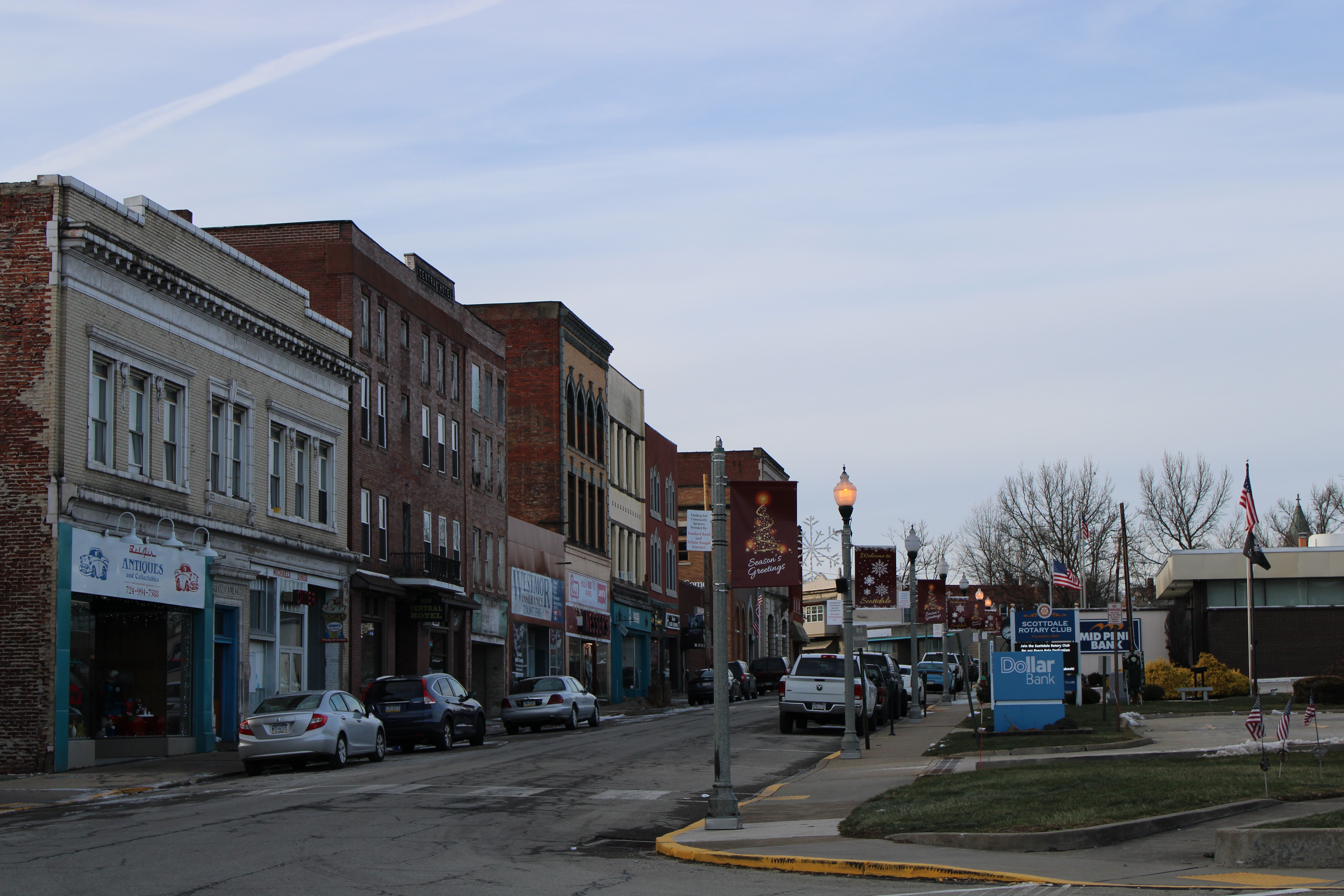
- Pittsburgh Street in Downtown Scottdale

- Location of Scottdale in Westmoreland County, Pennsylvania

- Location within Pennsylvania
- Coordinates: 40°06′55″N 79°35′59″W
- Country: United States
- State: Pennsylvania
- County: Westmoreland
- Settled: 1872
- Incorporated: 1874

Government
  - Type: Borough Council

Area
  - Total: 1.16 sq mi (3.00 km^{2})
  - Land: 1.16 sq mi (3.00 km^{2})
  - Water: 0 sq mi (0.00 km^{2})
- Elevation: 1,020 ft (310 m)

Population (2010)
  - Total: 4,384
  - Estimate (2019): 4,094
  - Density: 3,536/sq mi (1,365.3/km^{2})
- Time zone: UTC-5 (Eastern (EST))
  - Summer (DST): UTC-4 (EDT)
- Zip Code: 15683
- FIPS code: 42-68432
- Website: https://scottdaleborough.com/

Scottdale is a borough in Westmoreland County, Pennsylvania, United States, 32 miles (51 km) southeast of Pittsburgh.

Early in the 20th century, Scottdale was the center of the Frick coke interests. It had steel and iron pipe mills, brass and silver works, a casket factory, a large milk-pasteurizing plant, and machine shops; all of the aforementioned are presently defunct. Scottdale is notable for its economic decline from a formerly prosperous coke-town into an archetypal Rust Belt town. Duraloy Technologies, "a supplier of specialty high alloy, centrifugal and static cast components and assemblies" is the last remnant of Scottdale's steel related prosperity.

In 1900, 4,261 people lived in Scottdale; in 1910, the population increased to 5,456; and in 1940, 6,493 people lived in Scottdale. As of the 2020 census, Scottdale had a population of 4,430. Scottdale is located in the Southmoreland School District.

== History ==
=== 1770s-1900: Early history ===
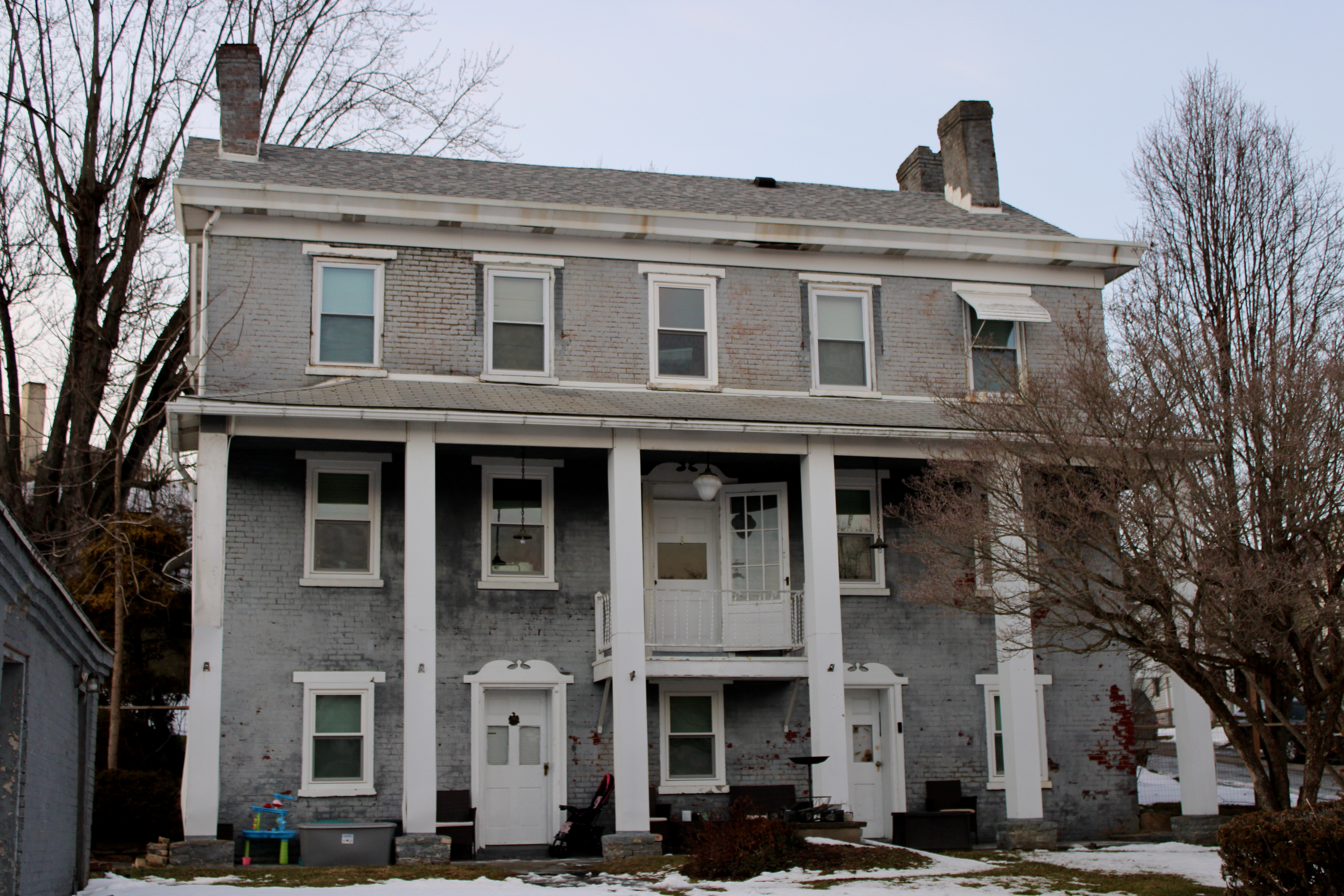
Jacob Loucks House, built in 1853, Scottdale’s oldest still standing building

It is difficult to identify when the first non-Native settler arrived in what is now the Borough of Scottdale, although the area witnessed an influx of Scotch-Irish immigrants in the late 1770s. In the mid-19th century, part of the present-day townsite was the location of a distillery, flour mill and post office known as Fountain Mills.

The Pennsylvania Railroad and Baltimore and Ohio Railroad each built branch lines through the community in the early 1870s. With the coming of the railroads, the community’s economy shifted from agriculture to manufacturing and mining. Two brothers who were local farmers, Peter and Jacob Loucks, realized the impact the railroads could have on the area and laid out a small townsite consisting of 24 lots, which went on sale in 1872.

The borough was originally named Fountain Mills, a reference to several mills that were operated in the borough. Scottdale was incorporated as a borough on February 5, 1874 and at that time named in honor of Thomas A. Scott, who had been president of the Pennsylvania Railroad and served as Assistant Secretary of War during the Civil War. Because Scottdale sits atop major coal deposits, the community flourished due to the surrounding coal mines, as well as ovens for converting coal into coke (fuel). The H. C. Frick Coke Company, controlled by Henry Clay Frick, was headquartered here. Scottdale’s factories in the early 20th century also produced iron pipe, tin, knives, steam engines, and caskets.

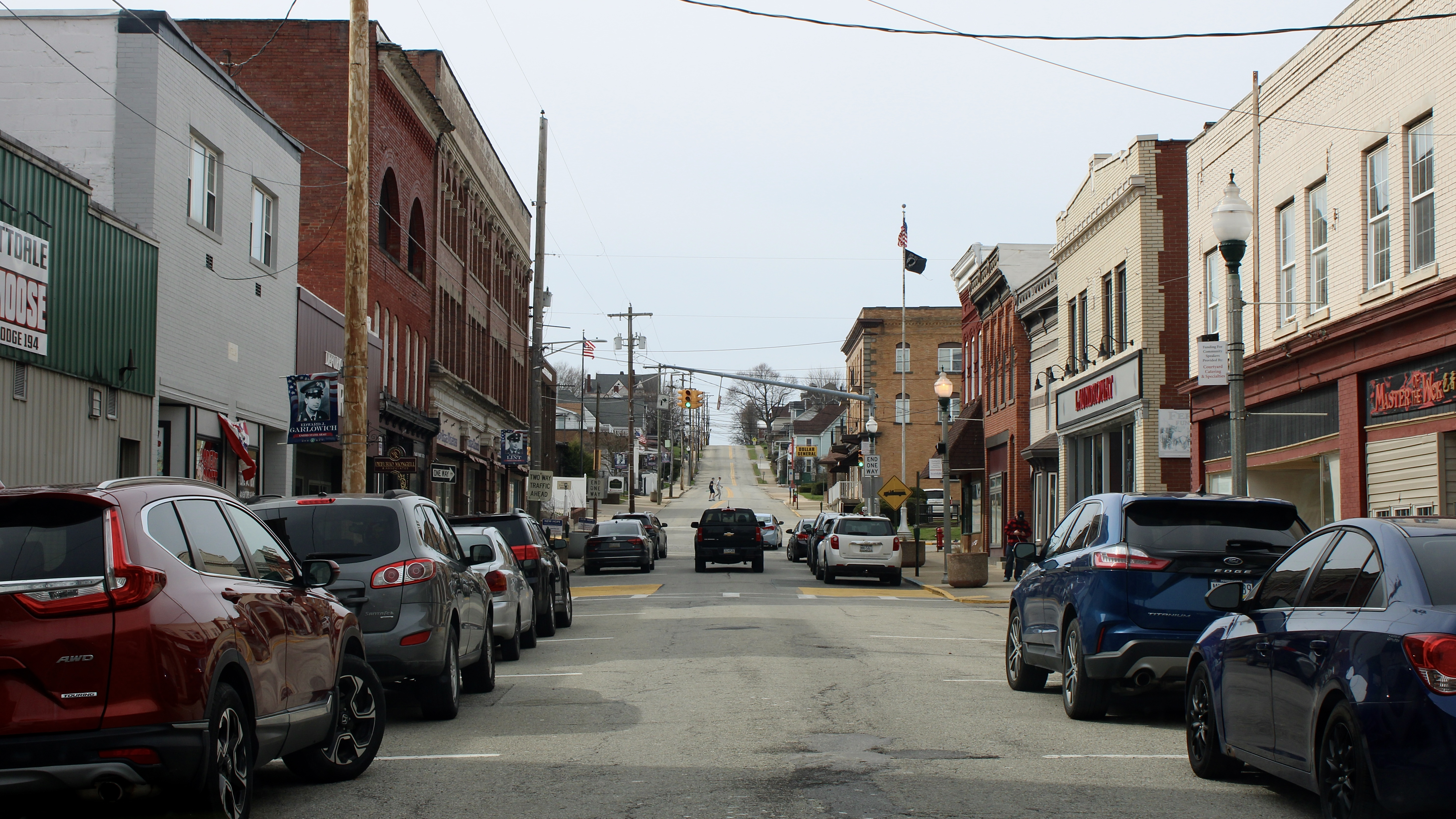
Pittsburgh Street in Scottdale, looking west

Scottdale has two sites on the National Register of Historic Places: Scottdale Armory (1929) at 501 North Broadway Street, and the Scottdale Historic District, which encompasses the oldest parts of the borough.

The oldest extant building in the borough is the Jacob Loucks House at 115 Walnut Avenue, built in 1853. Otherwise, the borough’s oldest residences are concentrated on Loucks Avenue, where many houses date from the 1880s. As well, three downtown retail buildings can be dated to approximately 1880: 101 Pittsburgh Street, 143 Pittsburgh Street, and 4-10 South Broadway Street.

The West Overton Museum in Scottdale is the only pre-Civil War village still intact today in Pennsylvania. It was named to the National Register of Historic Districts in 1985 as an outstanding example of a 19th-century rural industrial village complete with farm, two floors of the Overholt Mill/Distillery, industrial tools, Blacksmith Shop, a wash house and a smokehouse. It is a stop on the American Whiskey Trail

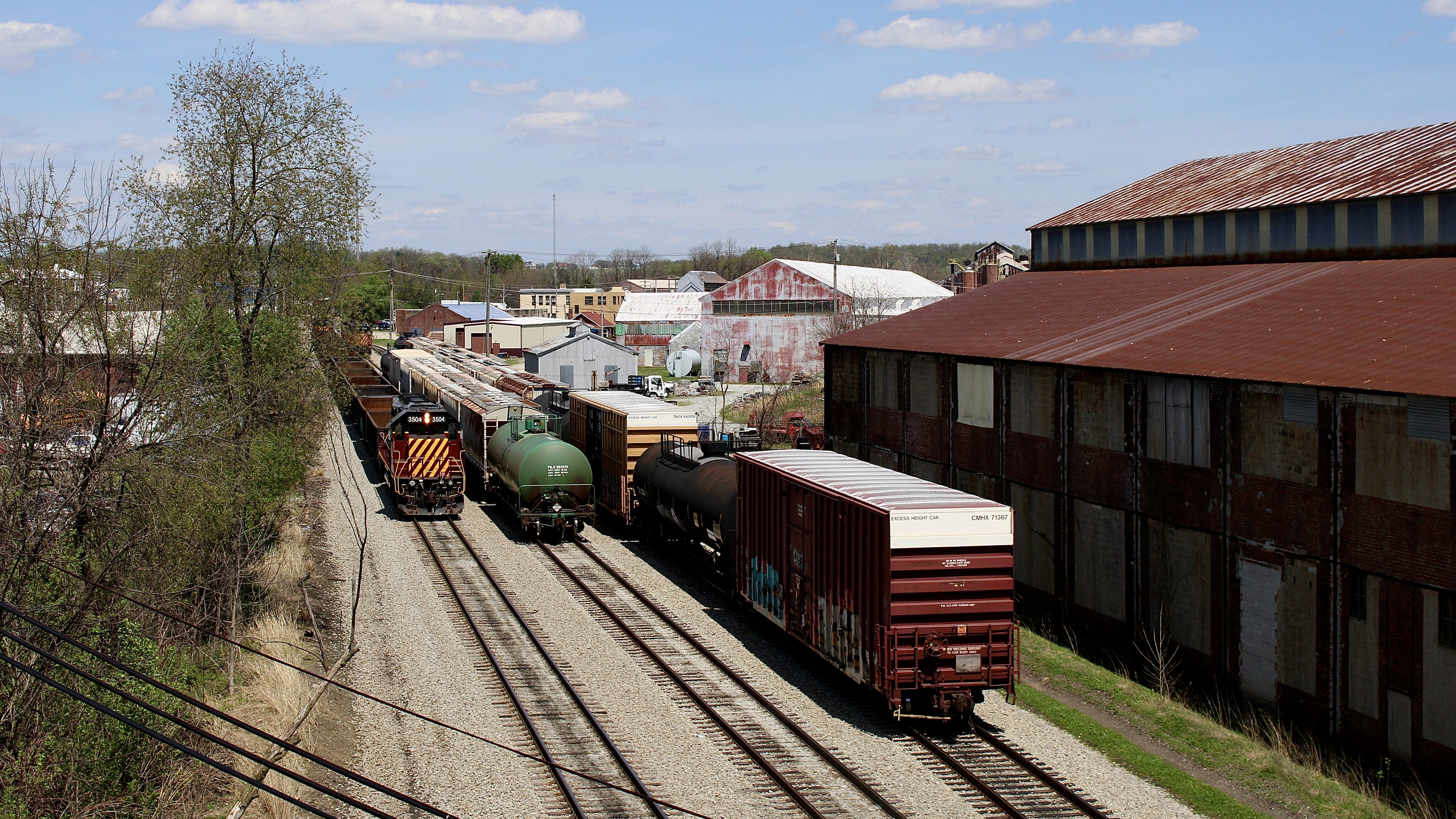
Trains docked at the Scottdale train station

Pittsburgh street and North Broadway street both encompass the Scottdale Historic District, which is registered with the National Register of Historic Places since 1996. The buildings located in the historic district were constructed between 1853 and 1950. The buildings on Pittsburgh Street primarily housed businesses while North Broadway primarily had residences, though, since the early 2000's, a number of businesses were added to the street.

By the conclusion of the 19th century, several structures that are staples of Scottdale's historic appearance were completed, including a number of homes on Mulberry street, Loucks avenue and Arthur avenue, along with construction of a school building on South Broadway street. Extending into south Scottdale, the Saint John the Baptist Roman Catholic Church on South Broadway street helped connect the vast amounts of farmland located towards Dawson, Pennsylvania to the borough's downtown area.

=== 1900-1968: Economic prosperity ===
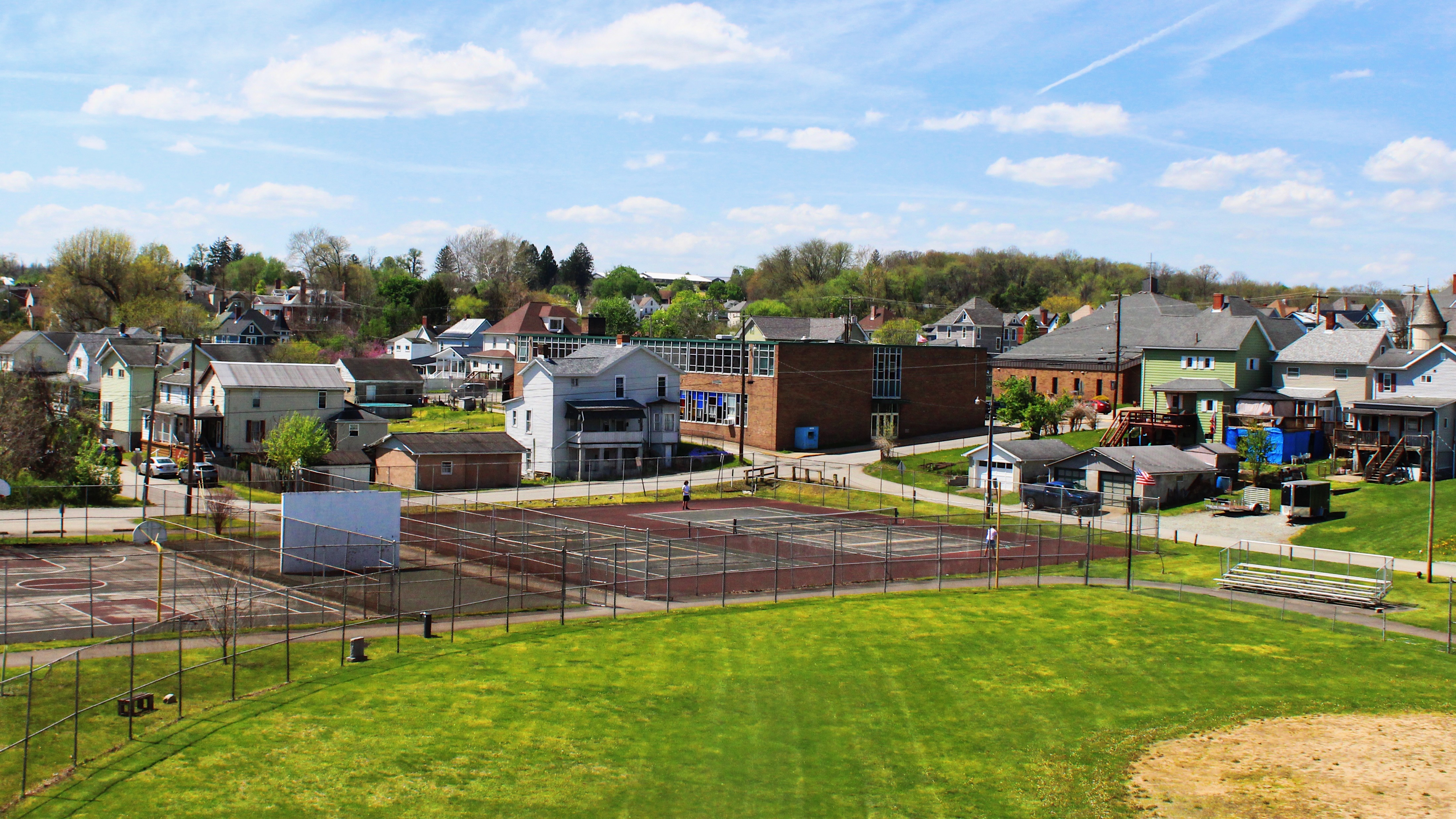
“Browntown” neighborhood of Scottdale as seen from Everson

e to 30,000 coke ovens in the early 1900s. These coke ovens were operated by hundreds of mining companies, this was due to Scottdale's location on the Pennsylvania Railroad which allowed these companies to ship coal and coke to major cities across the United States. Many of these mines were affected greatly by the Great Depression in 1929, leading to several of their closures.

The Coal and Coke Bike Trail in Scottdale was opened on the former route used by the Pennsylvania Railroad to ship coal and coke from Scottdale to Mount Pleasant. It encompasses five and a half miles of abandoned railroad and is maintained by volunteers from the Coal and Coke Chapter of the Regional Trail Corporation.

After the events of the Great Depression, new industrial work began to arise. One in particular, Duraloy Technologies, was opened sometime in the 1920s. Duraloy became the first company in the United States to create heat resistant alloys used for creating metal products. The company remains opened in its original building as of July 2024.

In 1900, The Geyer Performing Arts Center opened on Pittsburgh Street. It was originally an opera house and hosted vaudeville performances. In 1912, the building was sold and renamed The Scottdale Theater and was converted into a movie theater. The building changed hands once again in 1926 and renamed The Strand. The Strand was one of the first theaters to be equipped with a system that allowed for films with sound to be introduced. The Strand closed in 1969. With its reopening in April 1987, the theater shifted to stage theater performances, which it still holds as of June 2024. The Geyer has also been home to stand up comedy acts as well as concert performances.

=== 1969-present: Proposed mall construction and fallout ===
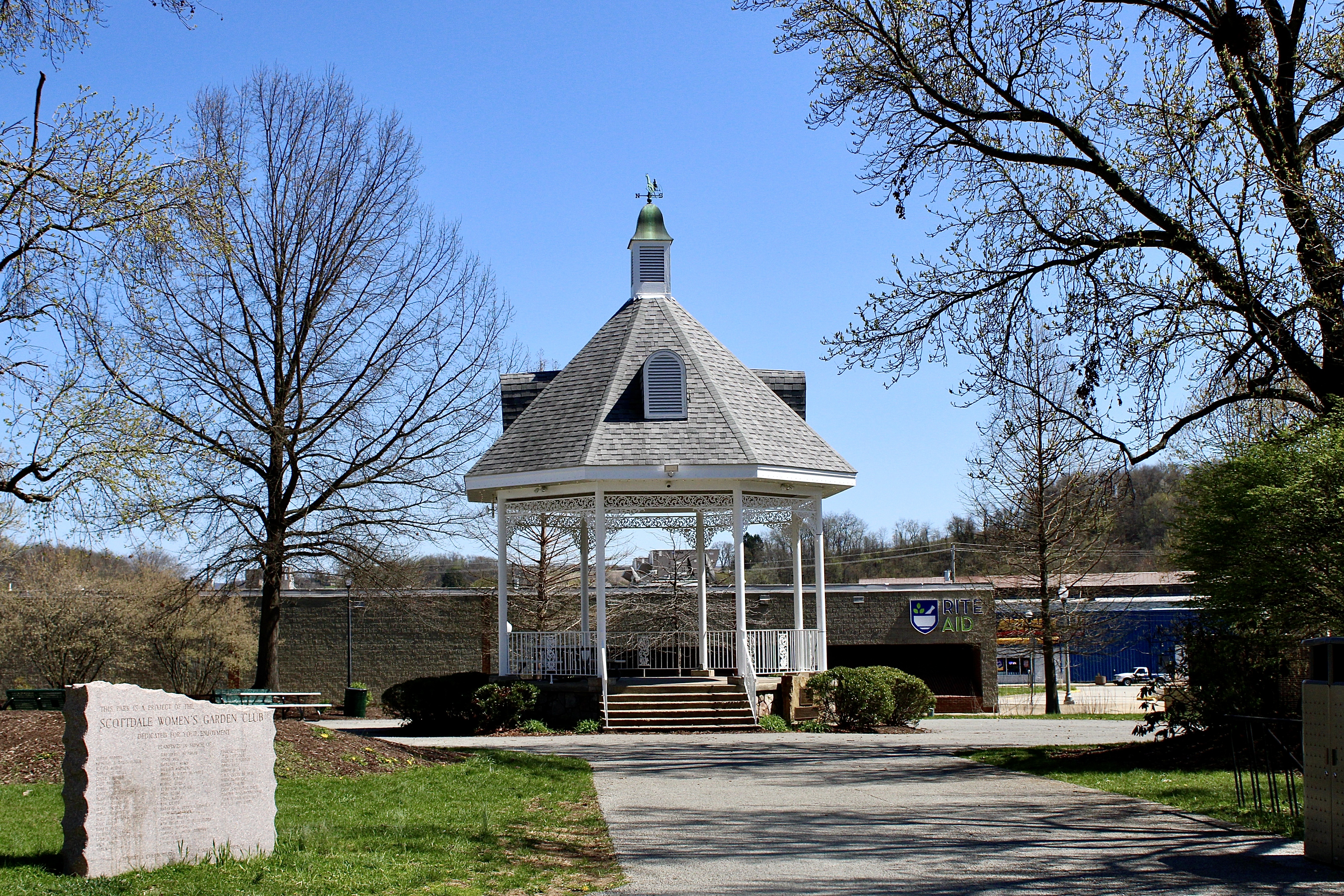
The gazebo in downtown Scottdale, erected in 1976

In 1969, Scottdale attempted an urban renewal project by building a mall. The mall was set to be located on Pittsburgh and North Broadway Streets in downtown Scottdale with a two pump gas station next-door. The development was to be equipped with several chain stores such as Giant Eagle and a Thorofare store. To prepare the site, new sidewalks, wiring and sewer lines were completed by June 1970.

By December 1970, the area was still not developed, with much of the businesses on the left side of Pittsburgh street being torn down to make room for the shopping plaza. Lanes of travel to access the area were left unpaved and only one lone bid had been accepted on space in the plaza, that being for the gas station that was to open next-door. Funding for the project began to run out with Scottdale's borough council refusing to give funding until buyers for lots began to show interest. The budget for a parking lot would be approved of in December 1971.

The mall continued to develop into September 1972 with one more bid being placed on space within the proposed plaza. Progress was finally made on the plaza in October 1974 when the borough signed a contract with a Uniontown based company to begin building on the site. By 1975, the mall project ceased, bringing the six year ordeal to an end.

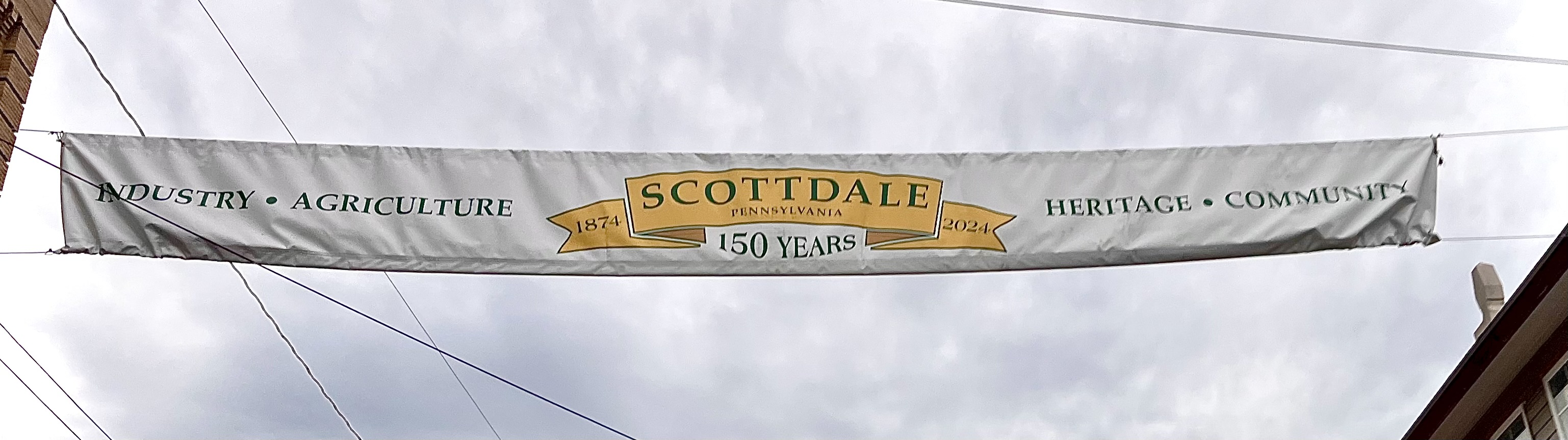
Banner commemorating Scottsdale’s 150th anniversary above Pittsburgh Street.

On Saturday, May 1, 1976, the area of the former would-be mall was dedicated as a park. In the park, a gazebo was erected as well as three flagpoles. A walkway was also introduced to access the park from Pittsburgh Street. In the decades since the failed mall project, Scottdale has opened a Rite-Aid Pharmacy, a YMCA Pool, public library and Veteran Memorial in place of the former development.

Scottdale has also used the space annually for their Fall Festival. Since 1973, the Scottdale Fall Festival has hosted multiple outdoor vendors, music performances and an annual parade which is participated in by local businesses as well as high school groups such as the Southmoreland football team and marching band. The Fall Festival is also where Southmoreland High School's homecoming king and queen are crowned.

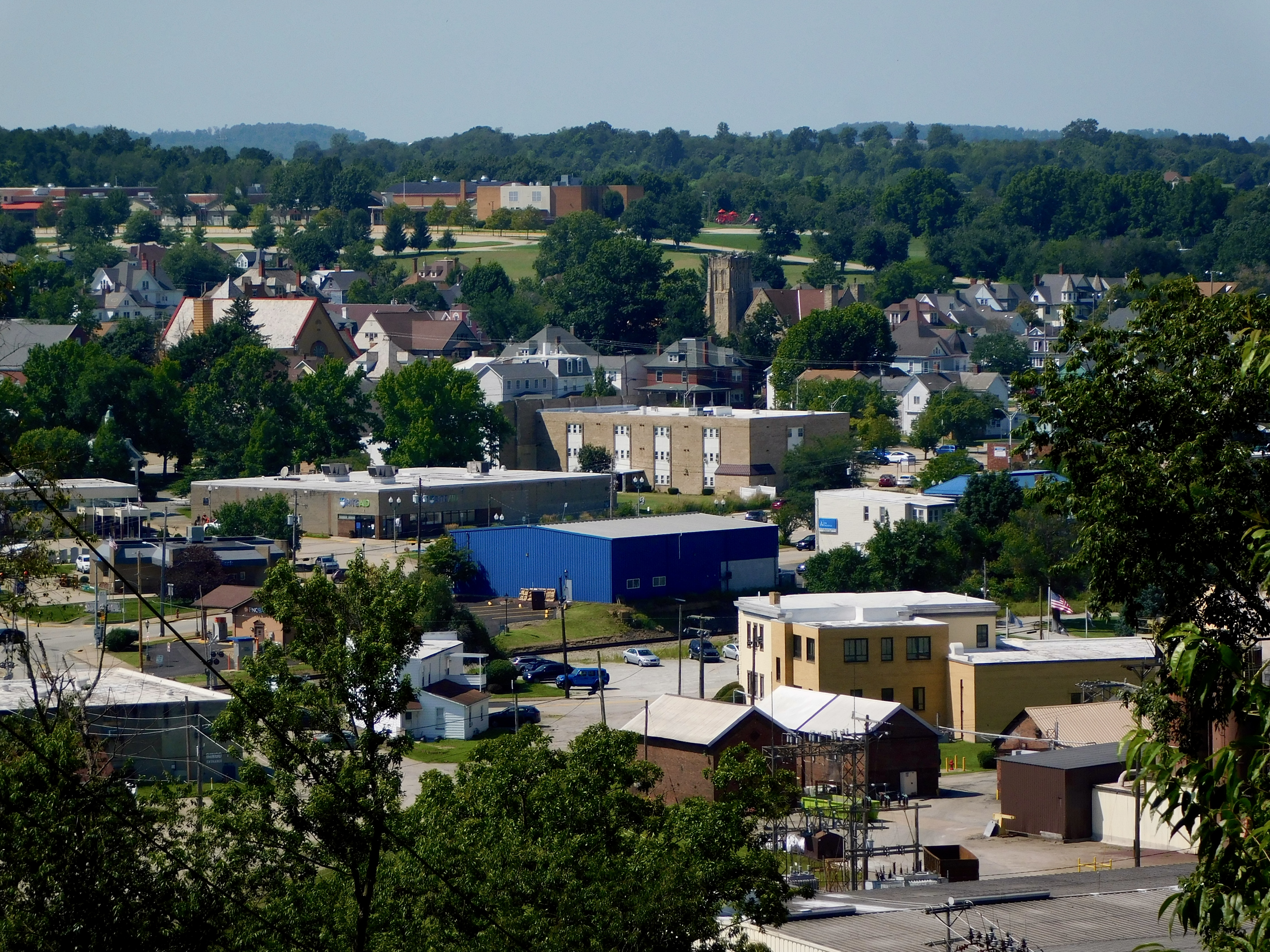
Downtown Scottdale in 2025

In the years following the failed mall construction, Scottdale has seen an economic decline. Approximately 2,000 of its residents are employed as of 2022 with a majority being in health care or retail work. 14.3% of Scottdale residents are below the poverty line with a median household income of just over $53,000. The borough also has an unemployment rate of 7.4%, which is 1.4% higher than the national average.

From 2004 until 2009, Scottdale's mayor was Patricia Walker. She was the borough's first female mayor as well as their first African American mayor. She was a 1951 graduate of Scottdale High School and had served on the borough council since 1988.

In 2022, the former Greystone Manor, once used as a department store, was purchased. Built in 1905, the building sat abandoned for decades where it deteriorated. With the purchase, $2 million in renovations have been made to restore the building.

Chuck King, Scottdale's mayor, was elected in 2010 and was named Pennsylvania's Mayor of the Year in 2024. King sought re-election, however, he lost the Republican nomination to Lindy House in the 2025 primary. With no democrats or third-party candidates on the mayoral ticket, she was named the title of mayor of the borough in 2026.

On June 6, 2026, Scottdale was heavily affected by a tornado and severe thunderstorms that left over half the borough without electricity for several days. The tornado also caused severe damage to several homes in the area and littered large amounts of debris in the downtown area as well as causing significant damage to the main roads throughout the borough. The following day, Mayor Lindy House declared an immediate "disaster emergency" for the borough, which was lifted days later.

== Education ==
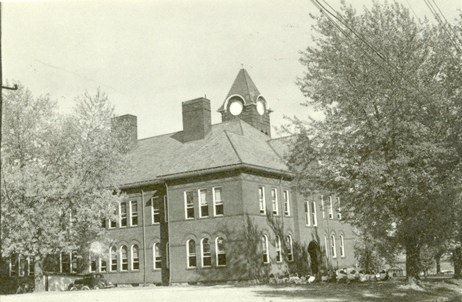
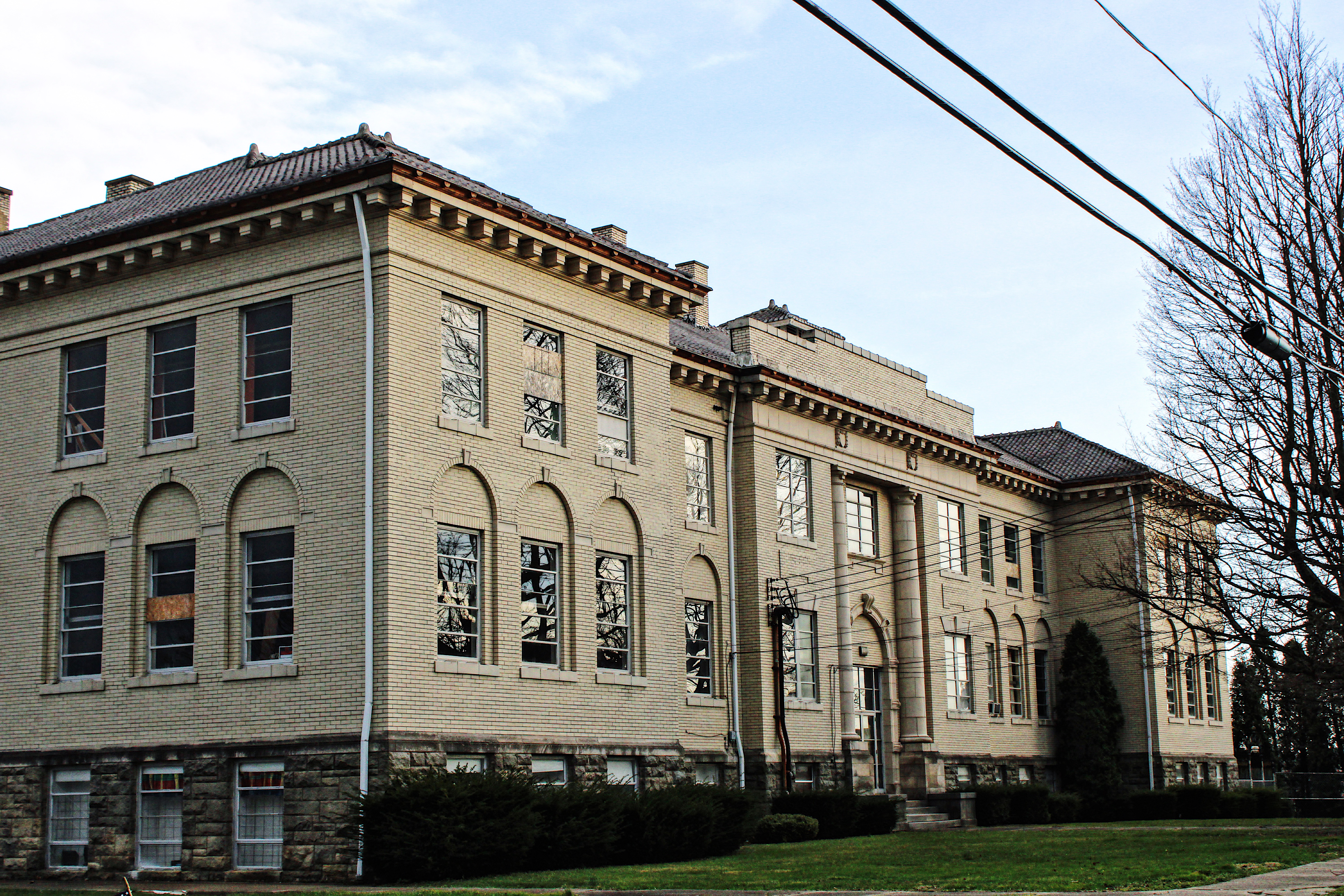
The former Scottdale Junior and Senior High Schools constructed in 1890 and 1901 respectively, the junior high school was demolished in 1966 while the high school remains as of December 2019

In 1805, the first schoolhouse in the area was built adjacent from Gaut’s Dairy Farm in rural Scottdale, near Alverton. The first school board for the district was established on September 19, 1834. The district began to expand and several more buildings were added before being split into two districts; Scottdale School District and East Huntingdon School District.

The Scottdale school district opened as multiple schools throughout the borough including North, Central and South grade schools. The original high school building was constructed in the late 1800s on the site of present day Chestnut Street Park. The building was demolished in 1901 and replaced by a new school building directly across the street the same year. With the advent of the new school building, Scottdale's student body became known as the "Scotties" and began using the Scottish Terrier mascot with white and blue colors to represent the district. A football field was constructed behind the school building leading to the school instituting sports teams for the first time.

By the 1952 school year, Scottdale High School began to be outgrown by the student body as well as merging with nearby Upper Tyrone School District, leading to a new building being developed. The new site, located North Chestnut Street, for the renamed Scottdale Joint High School was purchased on June 22, 1953. The building was first used for a Scotties basketball game in January 1958 with the school officially opening for instruction on September 3, 1958.

In the fall of 1964, Scottdale and nearby East Huntingdon School District merged to form Southmoreland School District with students from Scottdale Joint High School now attending classes at Southmoreland High School in Alverton. The former Scottdale Joint High School building was renovated into Southmoreland Elementary and Middle School in 2010.

== Geography ==
Scottdale is located at 40°6′55″N 79°35′59″W (40.102410, -79.591078).

According to the United States Census Bureau, the borough encompasses a total area of 1.2 square miles (3.1 km^{2}), all land.

Some cities that are near the borough include the cities of Pittsburgh (32 miles to the northwest), Connellsville (6.0 miles to the south), Dawson (6.0 miles to the southwest), Everson (0.9 miles south), Hunker (7.3 miles north), Mount Pleasant (4.7 miles northeast), New Stanton (8.2 miles north), South Connellsville (7.2 miles south) and Vanderbilt (6.9 miles southwest). It is also 38 miles northeast of Morgantown, West Virginia.

Jacob's Creek separates the Westmoreland and Fayette County border between Scottdale and Everson.

== Surrounding neighborhoods ==
Scottdale has three borders, including East Huntingdon to the north, northwest and west and the Fayette County neighborhoods of Upper Tyrone Township from the east-northeast to the south and Everson to the south.

There are several neighborhoods in the borough itself. North Scottdale is located on north side of Pittsburgh Street. It is home to the abandoned Wyndon Links golf course. South Scottdale begins at South Broadway Street and extends into Creek Road. The neighborhood located just past the Everson bridge from Garfield Avenue to Scottdale Cemetery is referred to locally as “Brown Town”.

== Demographics ==
Historical population
Census	Pop.	Note	%±
1880	1,275		—
1890	2,693		111.2%
1900	4,261		58.2%
1910	5,456		28.0%
1920	5,768		5.7%
1930	6,714		16.4%
1940	6,493		−3.3%
1950	6,249		−3.8%
1960	6,244		−0.1%
1970	5,818		−6.8%
1980	5,833		0.3%
1990	5,184		−11.1%
2000	4,772		−7.9%
2010	4,384		−8.1%
2020	4,430		1.0%

=== 2020 census ===
As of the 2020 census, Scottdale had a population of 4,430. The median age was 43.1 years. 21.5% of residents were under the age of 18 and 22.6% of residents were 65 years of age or older. For every 100 females there were 93.4 males, and for every 100 females age 18 and over there were 90.6 males age 18 and over.

100.0% of residents lived in urban areas, while 0.0% lived in rural areas.

There were 1,933 households in Scottdale, of which 25.9% had children under the age of 18 living in them. Of all households, 44.9% were married-couple households, 18.2% were households with a male householder and no spouse or partner present, and 29.4% were households with a female householder and no spouse or partner present. About 31.6% of all households were made up of individuals and 16.7% had someone living alone who was 65 years of age or older.

There were 2,141 housing units, of which 9.7% were vacant. The homeowner vacancy rate was 1.4% and the rental vacancy rate was 9.5%.

Racial composition as of the 2020 census
Race	Number	Percent
White	4,169	94.1%
Black or African American	40	0.9%
American Indian and Alaska Native	5	0.1%
Asian	13	0.3%
Native Hawaiian and Other Pacific Islander	4	0.1%
Some other race	16	0.4%
Two or more races	183	4.1%
Hispanic or Latino (of any race)	48	1.1%

=== 2000 census ===
As of the census of 2000, there were 4,772 people, 2,034 households, and 1,309 families residing in the borough. The population density was 4,094.9 inhabitants per square mile (1,581.0/km^{2}). There were 2,214 housing units at an average density of 1,899.9 per square mile (733.6/km^{2}). The racial makeup of the borough was 98.13% White, 1.11% African American, 0.10% Native American, 0.13% Asian, 0.06% Pacific Islander, 0.08% from other races, and 0.38% from two or more races. Hispanic or Latino of any race were 0.36% of the population.

There were 2,034 households, out of which 26.2% had children under the age of 18 living with them, 51.3% were married couples living together, 10.3% had a female householder with no husband present, and 35.6% were non-families. 32.7% of all households were made up of individuals, and 17.9% had someone living alone who was 65 years of age or older. The average household size was 2.31 and the average family size was 2.94.

In the borough the population was spread out, with 21.2% under the age of 18, 7.1% from 18 to 24, 26.5% from 25 to 44, 24.4% from 45 to 64, and 20.8% who were 65 years of age or older. The median age was 42 years. For every 100 females, there were 87.1 males. For every 100 females age 18 and over, there were 84.2 males.

The median income for a household in the borough was $32,000, and the median income for a family was $41,114. Males had a median income of $31,843 versus $22,143 for females. The per capita income for the borough was $17,994. About 5.2% of families and 8.3% of the population were below the poverty line, including 8.9% of those under age 18 and 7.8% of those age 65 or over.

=== Education ===
Education Levels: High School or higher: 87.2%, Bachelor's Degree or higher: 18.3%, Graduate or Professional Degree: 6.2%

=== Ancestry ===
Ancestries: 35.7% German, 12% Polish, 11.8% Irish, 10.5% Italian, 10.3% English, 4.6% Scottish.

=== Public safety ===
Scottdale's crime rate is less than 40% of the national average.

== Notable people ==
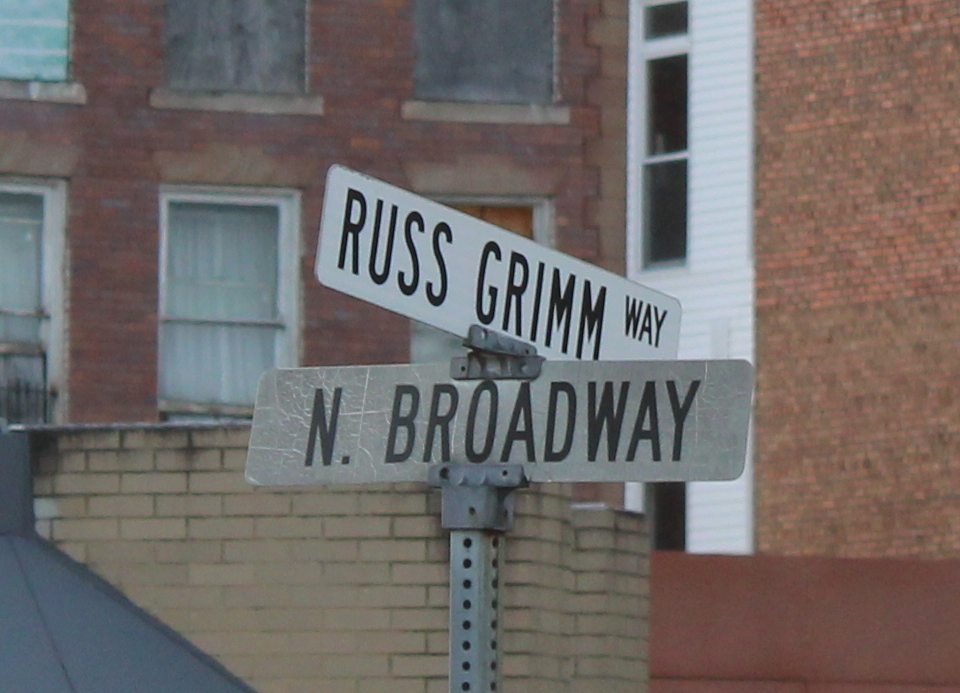
Street named for Russ Grimm

- Johnny Arthur, stage and film actor
- D. J. Coffman, comic book illustrator and cartoonist
- Leonard Goldenson, former president, American Broadcasting Company
- Russ Grimm, former professional football player, Washington Redskins, three-time Super Bowl champion, and Pro Football Hall of Fame inductee
- Jim Heise, former professional baseball player, Washington Senators
- Abraham Lincoln Keister, former U.S. Congressman
- Herbert Morrison, radio announcer best known for his reporting on the Hindenburg disaster in 1937
- Jack Onslow, former professional baseball player, Detroit Tigers and New York Giants
- Lillian Peacock, silent film actress
- Walter E. "Jack" Rollins, former musician
- Chris Shipley, technology industry analyst and commentator
