= Lillian Peacock =

American silent film actress

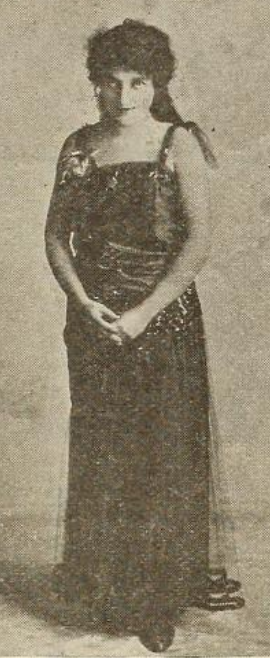
- Peacock, from a 1916 publication
- Born: October 23, 1889; Scottdale, Pennsylvania, U.S.
- Died: September 19, 1918 (aged 28); Los Angeles, California, U.S.
- Other name: Lillian M. Webb
- Occupation: Silent film actress
- Relatives: Harry S. Webb (brother)

Lillian Peacock (October 23, 1889 – August 19, 1918), born Lillian Melvina Webb, was a silent film actress, who appeared in more than 100 films. She died from injuries originally sustained during the filming of a stunt in 1916.

== Early life ==
Peacock was born in Scottdale, Pennsylvania, the daughter of Samuel W. Webb and Margaret Webb. Her father was a barber. Her younger brother Harry S. Webb was a film director and producer. She moved to Los Angeles with her parents in 1907, and married Roy W. Peacock, a real estate agent, in 1909; they divorced in 1914.

== Career and death ==
Peacock began acting in the film studios at the age of nineteen. She worked for Universal Pictures, Pathe Pictures and Bosworth Pictures, at various times, and made over a hundred silent films, beginning with an appearance in Wanted–A Piano Tuner in 1915. Her last film efforts were Cave Man Stuff, Who's To Blame? and The Pie-Eyed Piper, all in 1918. She was in several films with actress ZaSu Pitts and director William Beaudine.

Peacock broke her collarbone in a car accident in 1915, but returned to film work after two months. She was severely injured in 1916 during the filming of a comedy scene in Bombs and Business, in which she was to leap from one running automobile to another. Despite her injuries, she continued her career. In early 1918 she became incapacitated by the lasting effects of her injuries. She died in August of that year at the home of her parents in Los Angeles. She was 28 years old. Her grave is at Hollywood Forever Cemetery.
