= Alverton, Pennsylvania =

Unincorporated community in Pennsylvania, US

- Unincorporated community
- Entrance to Alverton from Fenton Road in 2026

- Location within Pennsylvania
- Coordinates: 40°08′24″N 79°35′14″W
- Country: United States
- State: Pennsylvania
- County: Westmoreland
- Elevation: 1,099 ft (335 m)
- Time zone: UTC-5 (Eastern (EST))
  - Summer (DST): UTC-4 (EDT)
- ZIP Code: 15612
- Area codes: 724, 878
- GNIS feature ID: 1168243

Alverton is an unincorporated community in East Huntingdon Township, Westmoreland County, Pennsylvania, United States. The community is located along Pennsylvania Route 981, 2.5 miles (4.0 km) west of Mount Pleasant. Alverton has a post office, with ZIP Code 15612.

== History ==
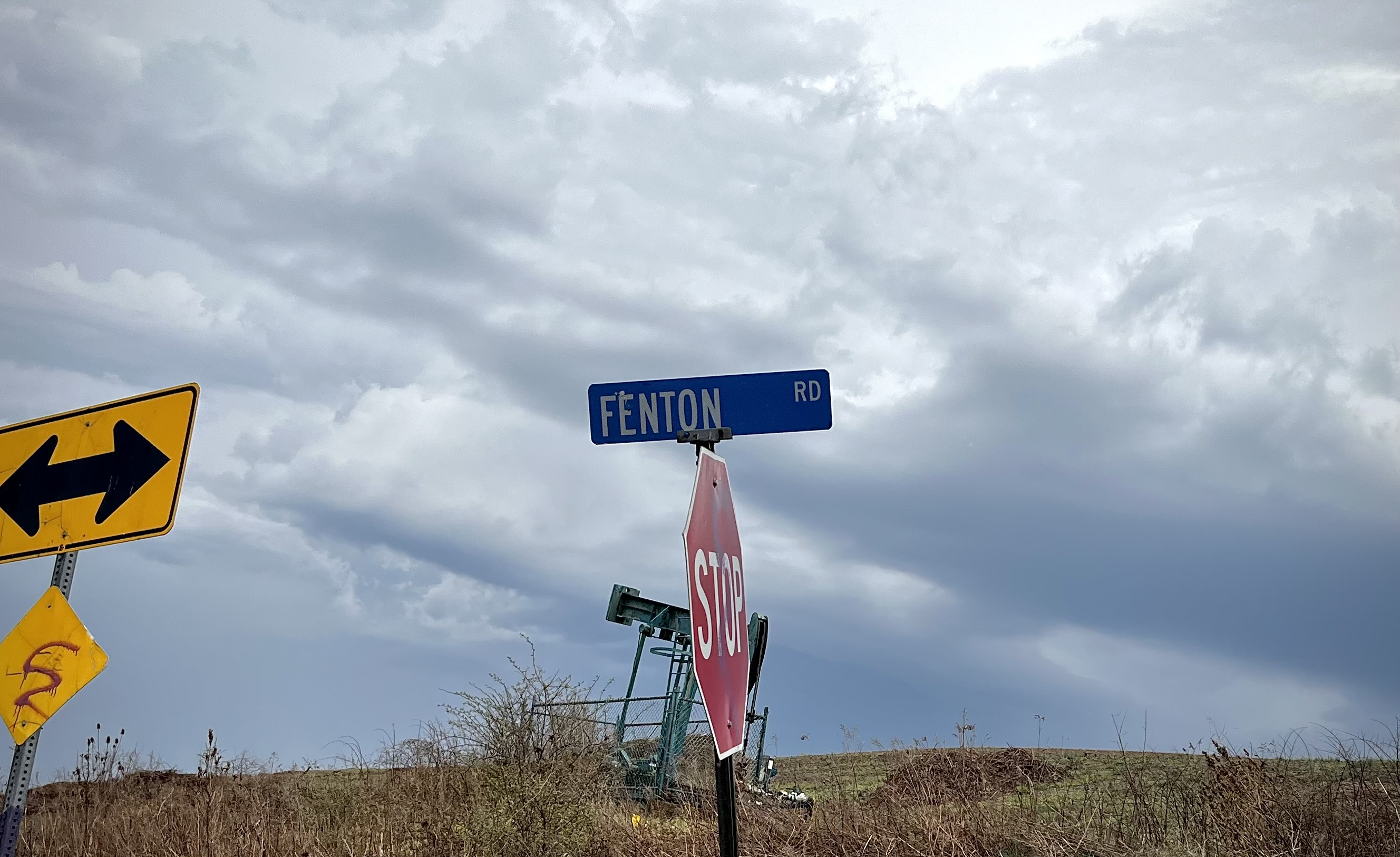
Fenton Road, near Southmoreland High School, connects Alverton to downtown East Huntingdon Township

According to historian John Boucher, the village was originally called Stonerville. A Mennonite congregation built a log meeting house there in the early 1800s, and a brick meeting house in 1841.

The community developed along the South-West Branch of the Pennsylvania Railroad, which originated in Greensburg. It became a key center for coal and coke production, with two significant mines, Donnelly and Mayfield, beginning operations in 1878. At its peak, more than 300 workers were employed in these mines.

During the 1890s, Alverton hosted five coke oven operations, including the Mayfield works with 104 ovens, Donnelly with 254 ovens, and the Union Coke Works with 10 ovens. The Southwest No. 4 works, operated by the Southwest Connellsville Coal & Coke Co., was located adjacent to Alverton. Additionally, the Enterprise Works, containing 51 beehive coke ovens, was situated at the site now occupied by the entrance to the Alverton landfill. Alverton No. 2, also known as Donnelly, housed 200 coke ovens in 1880. It was initially operated by Donnelly and Dillenger before changing ownership to the McClure Coke Co., Frick Coal and Coke Co., and later the Alverton Coke Company. Some of these ovens continued operation into the 1960s before being dismantled. Mayfield, originally a McClure plant established around 1878, was renamed Alverton No. 2 in 1899. Initially containing 55 ovens, the plant expanded to 104 ovens by 1890. McClure was absorbed by Frick in 1895, and the plant continued operations under the McClure name but was controlled by Frick. The last known record of Alverton No. 2 dates to 1920.

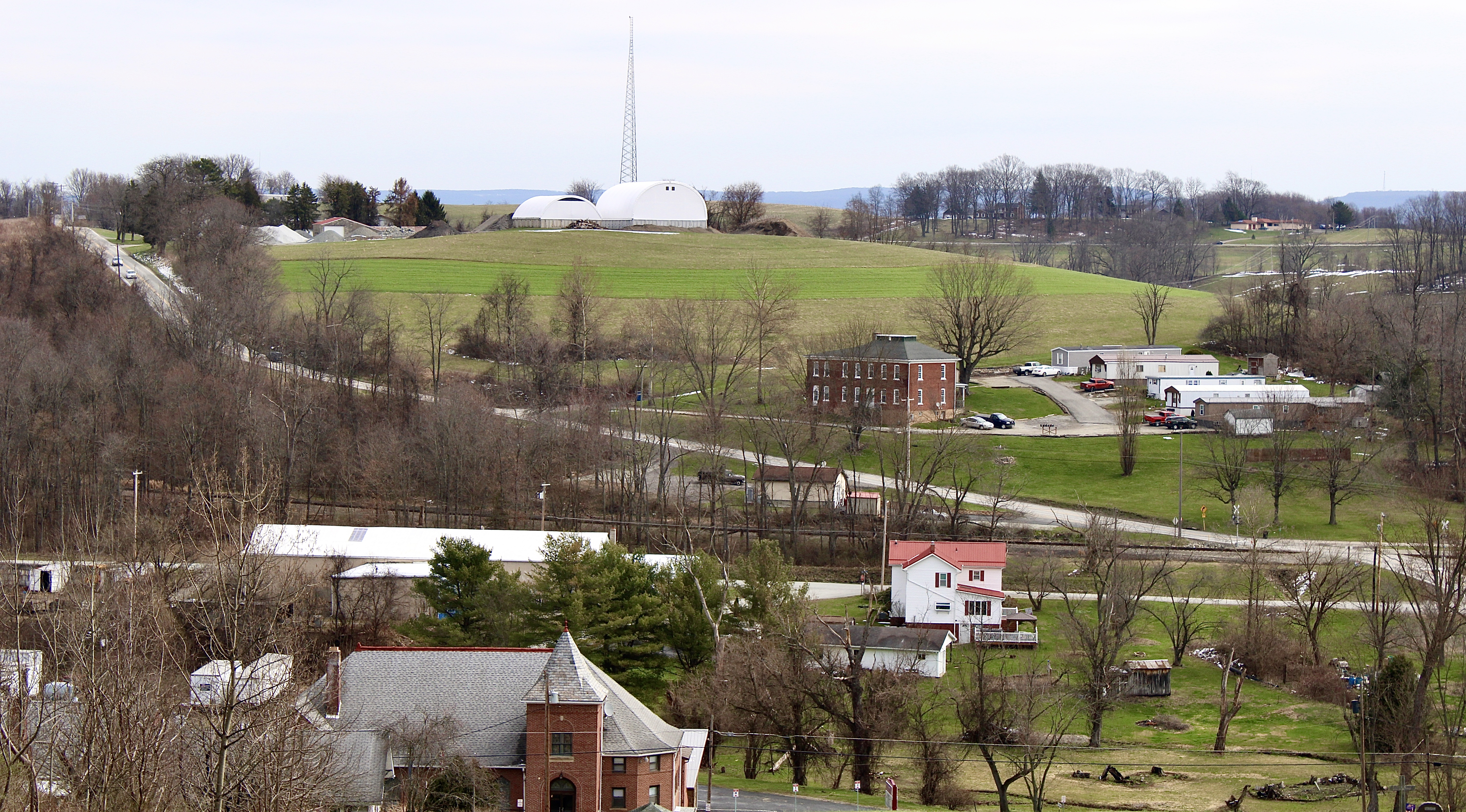
View of Alverton from the top of the Alverton Cemetery

Coking operations in Alverton continued until 1983. The last non-by-product coke ovens in Pennsylvania were located in Alverton and were closed by the Pennsylvania Department of Environmental Resources in 1982. These ovens, constructed in the 1970s, were rectangular rather than the traditional beehive shape but functioned similarly.

A 1994 study documented seven surviving company-built houses and a former hotel, believed to date to the 1880s and 1900, respectively. Additionally, remnants of coke ovens were noted. Logging and demolition activities in the early 2000s likely resulted in the removal of additional historical structures.

== Education ==
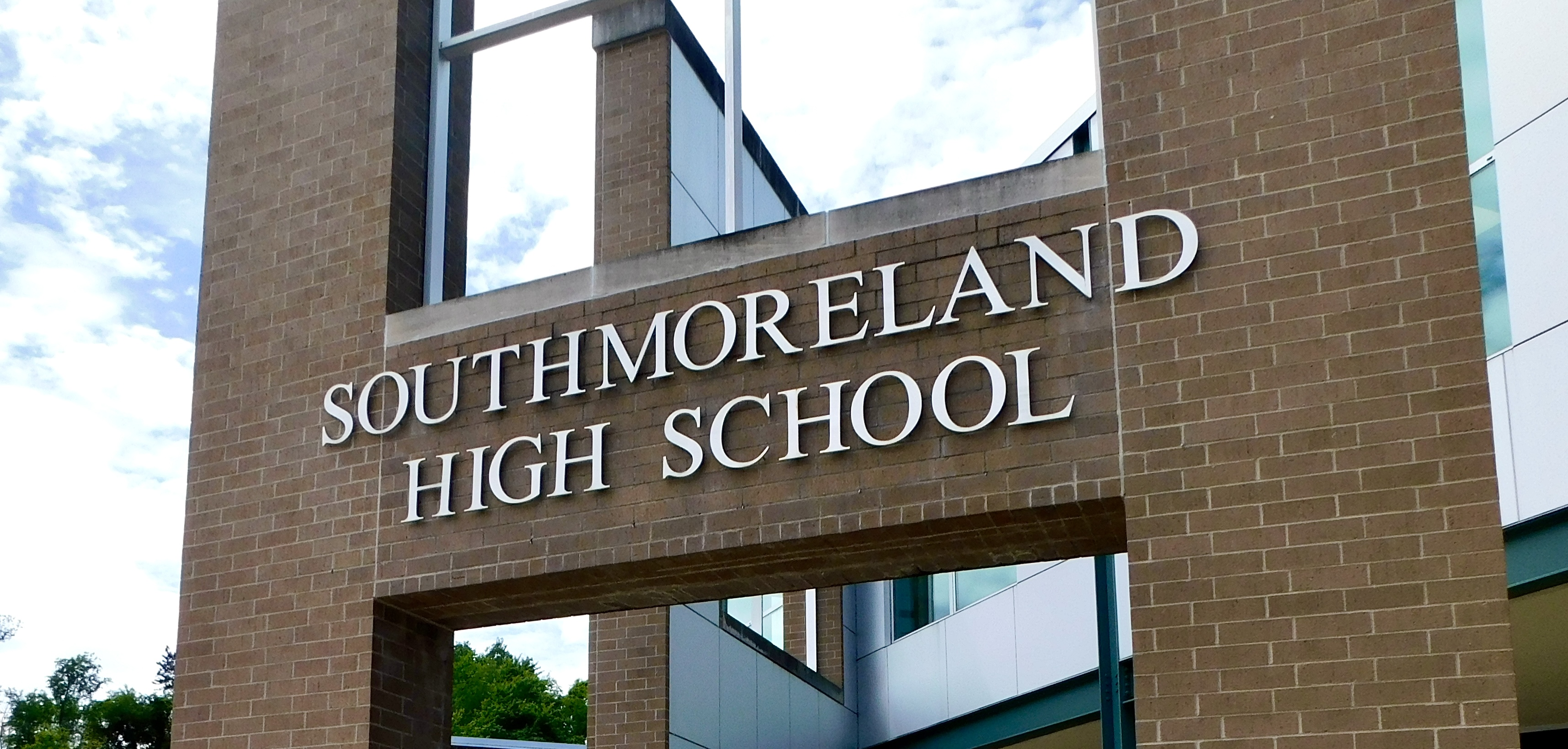
Southmoreland High School, located in Alverton

Alverton is home to Southmoreland High School and Southmoreland Primary Center, both part of the Southmoreland School District. The community was also the site of the former East Huntingdon Township High School, built in 1924 to replace an earlier high school dating back to the early 20th century. The school served East Huntingdon Township until 1964, when the district merged with the Scottdale School District to form the Southmoreland School District.

The building was renamed Southmoreland High School and remained in use until the late 1970s, when a new facility was constructed across Route 981. The original structure was repurposed as Southmoreland Junior High School until 2010, when a new middle school was built in Scottdale. The former high school building was later demolished, and its site now serves as a parking lot for the school’s football stadium.

The school's most notable alum is former professional football player Russ Grimm who played for the Washington Redskins as well as served as an assistant coach for the Pittsburgh Steelers. He is a three-time Super Bowl champion and is a member of the Pro Football Hall of Fame.

== Economy ==
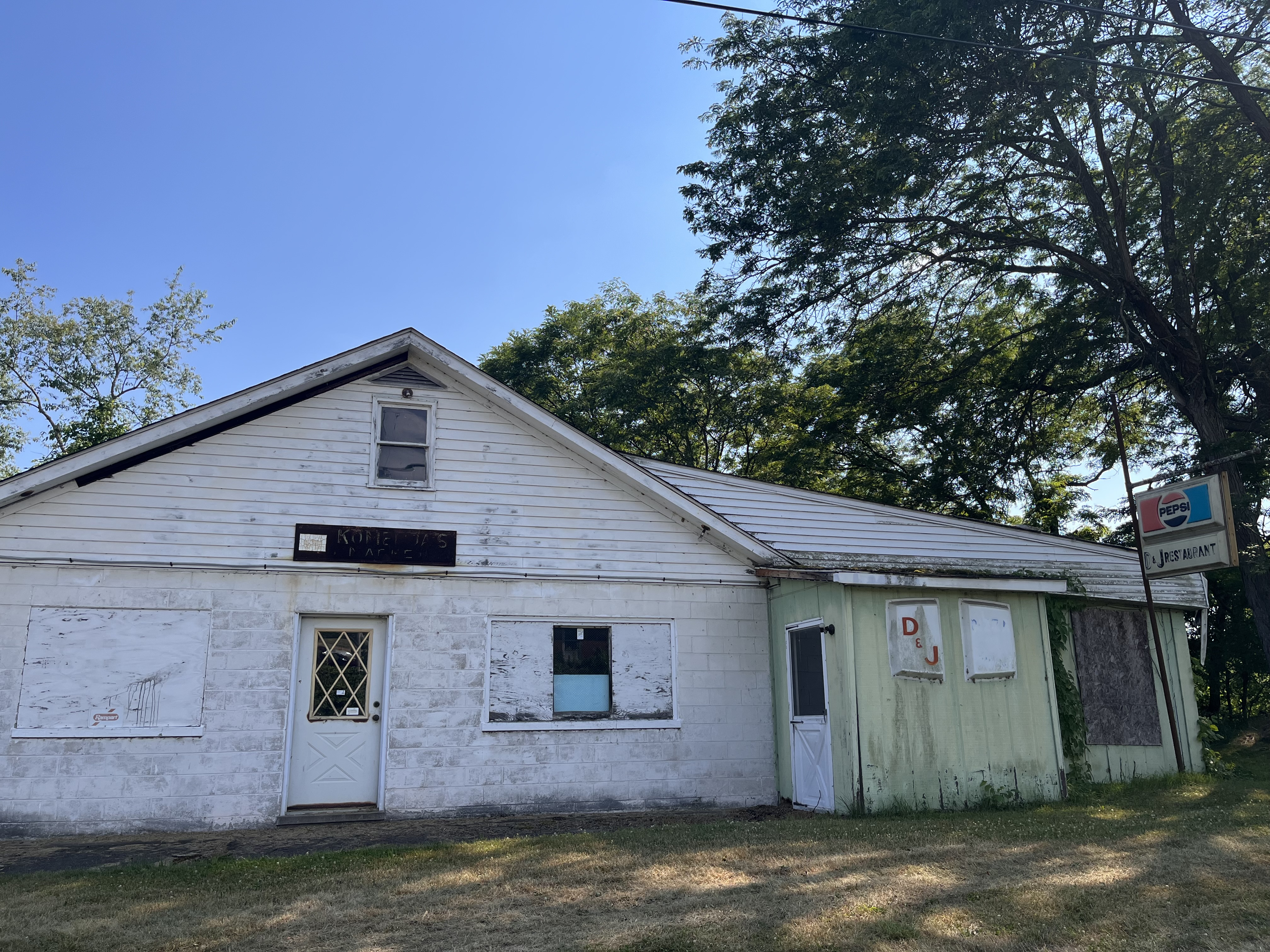
Former Komenda's Place restaurant in Alverton, which sits abandoned as of 2024

Due to Alverton's location, its economy is primarily fueled by local farms. Residents that are not present on farmland typically rely on businesses in nearby Scottdale and East Huntingdon.

The remnants of several local businesses, including a "D&J Restaurant" and a building with a sign that reads "Barbershop", remain abandoned throughout the area between Alverton and Scottdale. There is also a Republic Services landfill located on Landfill Road that has been opened for much of the village's history.

The average household income was reported at about $85,000 annually.

== Population ==
According to estimates dated in 2024, there are a total of 385 residents in Alverton with a population density of 179 people per square mile. There are 169 homes in the village as well. 94.3% of residents are white, 0.3% are black, 0.8% asian and the remaining 4.2% are one or more races.
