= Scottdale Historic District =

Historic district in Pennsylvania, United States

- U.S. National Register of Historic Places
- U.S. Historic district
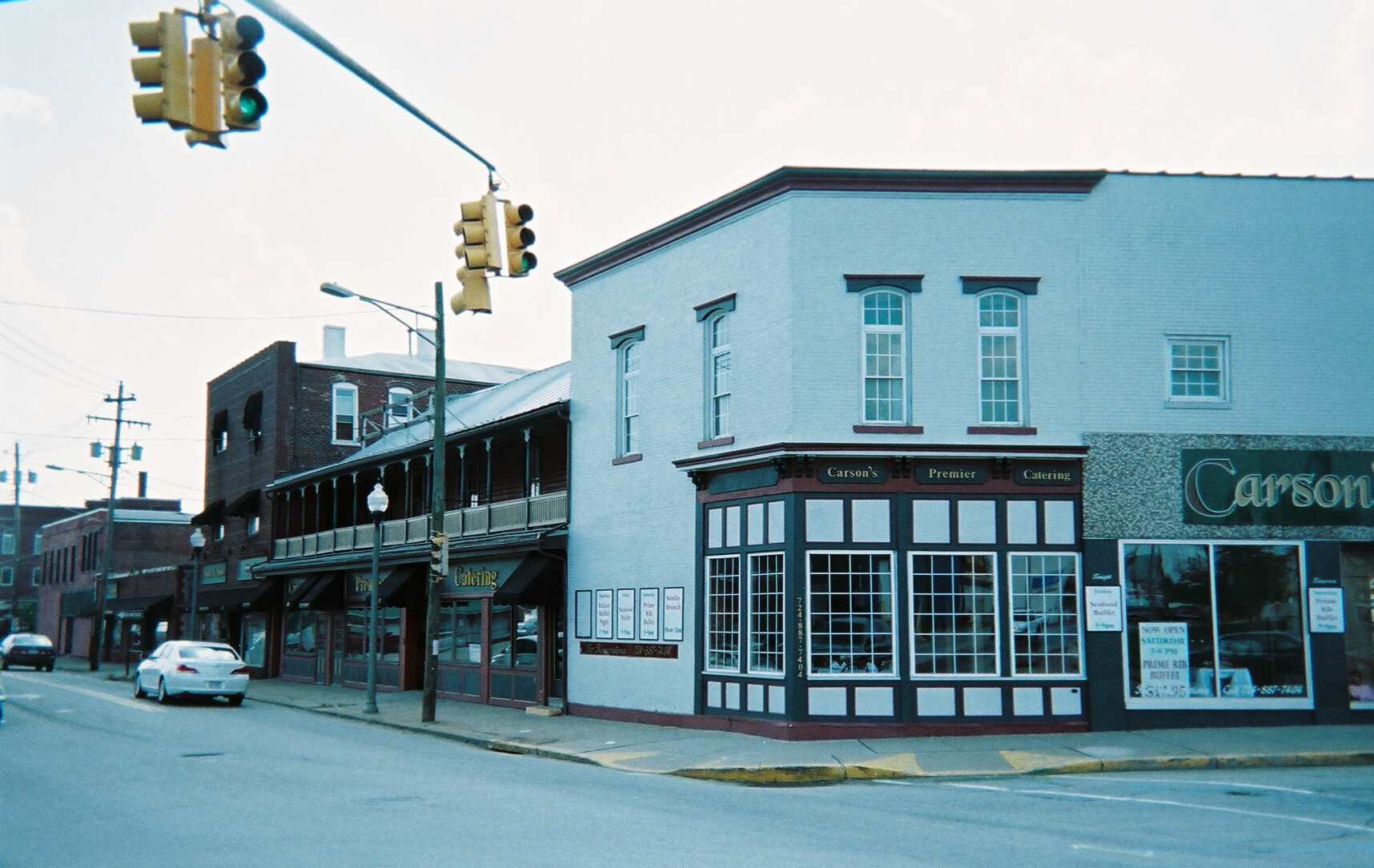
- Scottdale Historic District, August 2008

- Location within Pennsylvania Location within the United States
- Location: Roughly bounded by Walnut St., Constitution Way, Arthur Ave. and Jacob's Cr., Scottdale, Pennsylvania
- Coordinates: 40°06′05″N 79°35′22″W
- Area: 83 acres (34 ha)
- Built: 1874
- Built by: Fulton, J.C.; Zearly, S.J.
- Architectural style: Italianate, Queen Anne, Colonial Revival
- NRHP reference No.: 96000320
- Added to NRHP: March 29, 1996

The Scottdale Historic District is a national historic district that is located in Scottdale, Westmoreland County, Pennsylvania.

It was added to the National Register of Historic Places in 1996.

== History and architectural features ==
This district encompasses 242 contributing buildings and one contributing structure that are located in the central business district and surrounding residential areas of Scottdale. They were built roughly between 1853 and 1950, and include a mix of residential, commercial, institutional, and industrial properties that were designed in a variety of popular architectural styles, including Italianate, Queen Anne, and Colonial Revival.

Notable buildings include the Duraloy Technologies complex, the Uptegraff Manufacturing Company, Scottsdale Savings and Trust (1907), DeMuth Flowers (1887), Loucks Hardware Company (c. 1880), Cossels Food Mart (1914), the Frick Coke Company offices (1887, 1906), the Broadway Drug Store (c. 1935), Calvin United Presbyterian Church (1898), First Baptist Church (1906), the former high school (c. 1920), the A.K. Stauffer House (c. 1880), the E.H. Reid House (1905-1910), and a Lustron house (1950).
