= Everson, Pennsylvania =

Borough in Pennsylvania, US

- Borough
- Brown Street and Everson Bridge

- Location of Everson in Fayette County, Pennsylvania.

- Location in Pennsylvania Everson (the United States)
- Coordinates: 40°5′26″N 79°35′13″W
- Country: United States
- State: Pennsylvania
- County: Fayette
- Established: 1903

Government
  - Mayor: Tim Shoemaker

Area
  - Total: 0.22 sq mi (0.56 km^{2})
  - Land: 0.22 sq mi (0.56 km^{2})
  - Water: 0 sq mi (0.00 km^{2})
- Elevation: 1,070 ft (330 m)

Population (2020)
  - Total: 771
  - Density: 3,569.4/sq mi (1,378.17/km^{2})
- Time zone: UTC-4 (EST)
  - Summer (DST): UTC-5 (EDT)
- ZIP code: 15631
- Area code: 724
- FIPS code: 42-24336
- Website: https://eversonborough.org/

Everson is a borough in Fayette County, Pennsylvania, United States. The population was 768 at the 2020 census. Established in the mid-18th century and incorporated in 1903, it developed as a coal and coke town, attracting many Polish immigrants who founded much of the borough's businesses. The borough’s economy once centered on industry and a busy main street, but declined with the fall of coal and rail.

== History ==
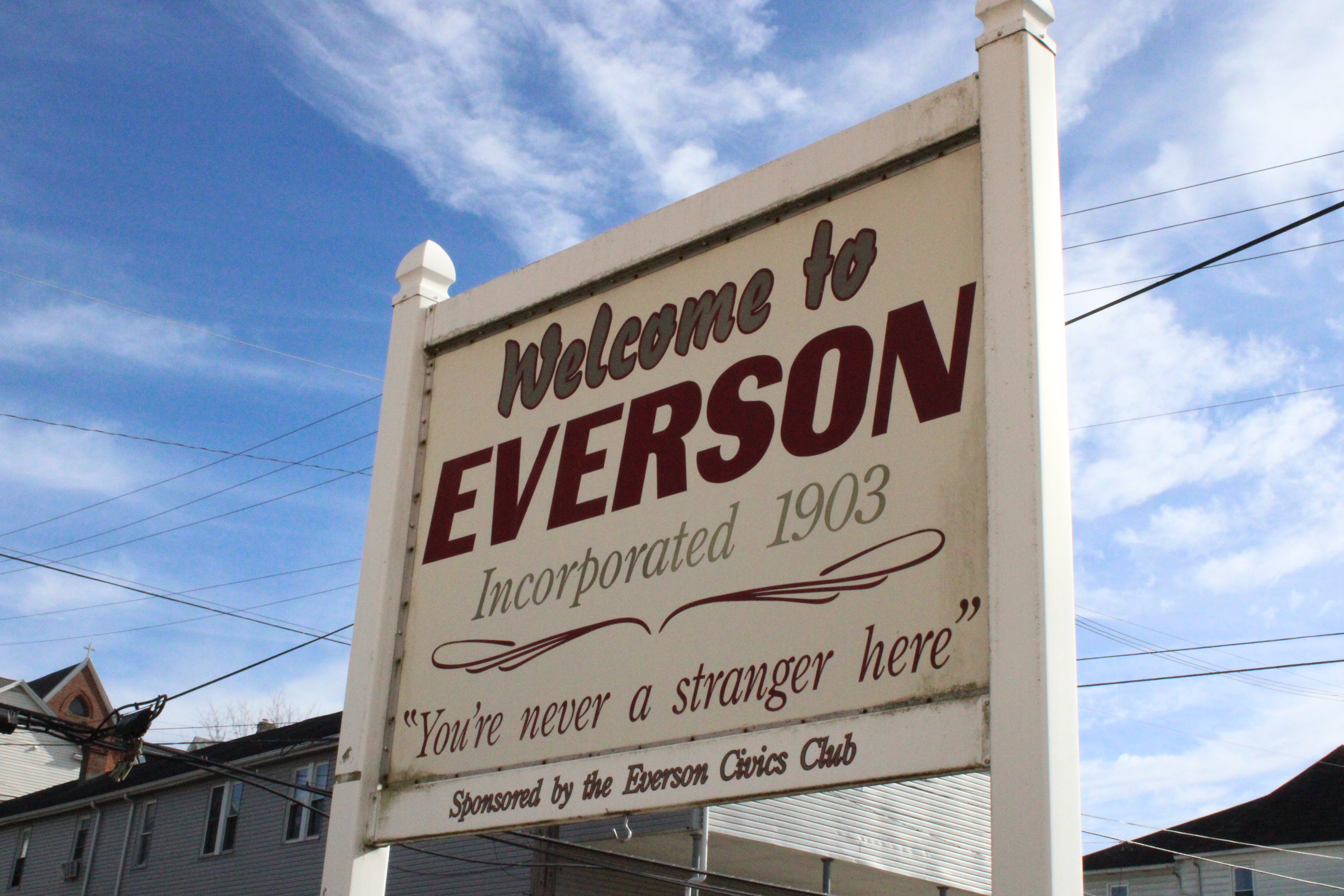
Sign at the entrance of Everson pictured in 2026

European colonists entered the region in the mid-18th century and encountered an Indigenous community whose leader they referred to as "Jacob." The name was later applied to the waterway that traverses the area, Jacob's Creek, which today forms part of the boundary between Fayette and Westmoreland counties. Early accounts indicate that some of the first permanent non-Indigenous settlers were Mennonites who established what came to be known as the Jacob's Creek Settlement.

During the 1800s the settlement became part of Upper Tyrone Township and developed as a coal- and coke-producing community. Industrial employment attracted European immigrants, many of them from Poland, who settled with their families and contributed to a growing, ethnically diverse population. By the late 19th century these immigrants organized what is believed to be one of the earliest Polish Catholic congregations in western Pennsylvania, the parish that became St. Joseph Roman Catholic Church. Built a block above the present-day main street, the parish complex eventually included a rectory, convent, and parochial school. By the early 20th century parish rolls listed roughly 450 families, and nearly 600 students were enrolled in the school. Parish-affiliated societies included the Holy Rosary Society, the Ladies Guild, and a Parent–Teacher Guild. The school closed in 1990; the building has continued in use for religious education and parish social functions. The parish has been served in recent years by the Rev. Robert Washko.

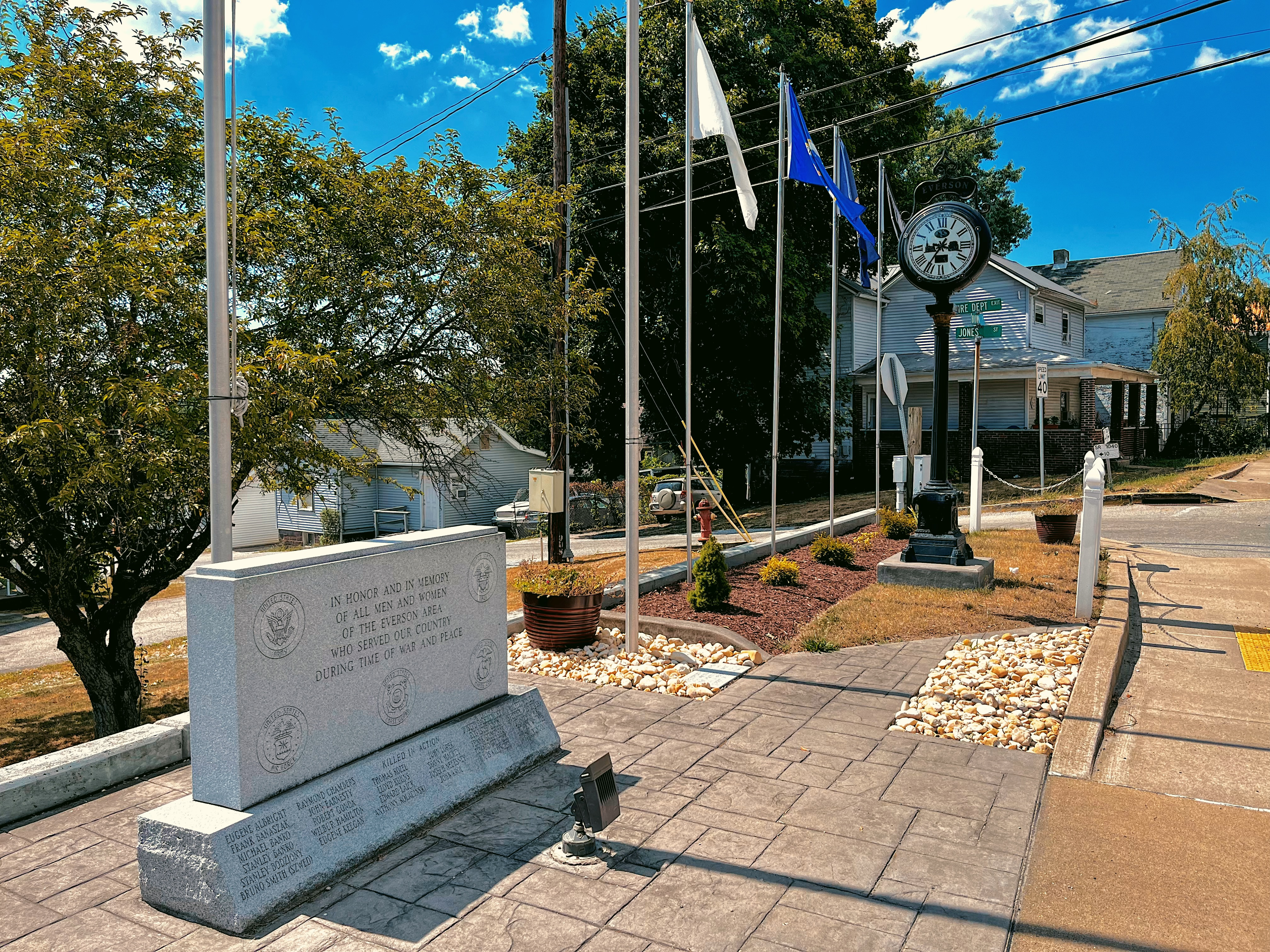
Memorial in Everson dedicated to the borough's veterans (c. 2018)

Population growth in the late 19th and early 20th centuries—reaching nearly 1,400 residents by 1903—prompted a local movement to seek self-government. The community incorporated as the Borough of Everson in 1903. Residents selected the name in honor of Barclay Mozart (B.M.) Everson, a local businessman who operated a mill on the Fayette County side of Jacob's Creek and who had earlier overseen operations at the Charlotte Furnace for his father. The area lying below the borough, from the Baltimore and Ohio Railroad tracks to Jacob's Creek, remained in Upper Tyrone and came to be known as Everson Bottoms.

Following incorporation, municipal and civic institutions expanded. A public school, post office, volunteer fire protection, an Evangelical congregation, and a local police presence were established over time. Various civic clubs and fraternal groups also organized during this period. Everson's main street developed into a compact commercial district that at various times supported general and specialty retail stores, groceries, drugstores, bakeries, hotels, restaurants, taverns, physicians' offices, and other service-related enterprises. Industrial and semi-industrial operations in or near the borough included a bottling works, glass plant, foundry, men's clothing factory, and rail car shop. Residents also recalled a newsstand, several dance halls, and trolley service linking Everson with neighboring communities. Like many coal- and rail-dependent communities in the region, Everson was affected by the long-term decline of the coal industry, reductions in railroad employment, and broader shifts in manufacturing. Many local businesses closed, and some families moved away as employment opportunities contracted.

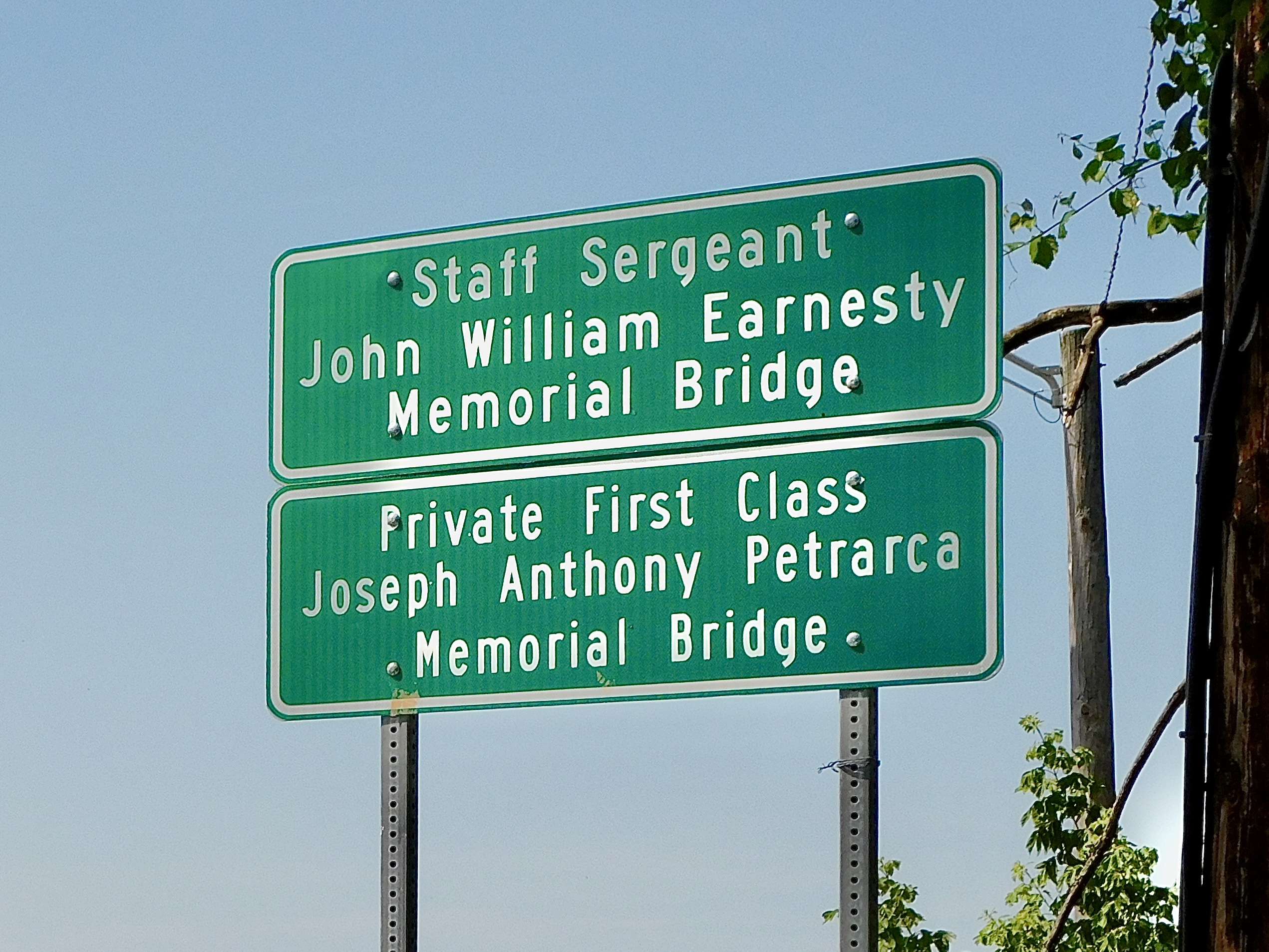
Sign posted on the Everson bridge in memory of two soldiers killed in the Vietnam War from Scottdale and Everson

The Everson Volunteer Fire Company was organized in 1909 to provide fire protection and emergency response. Its service area extends beyond the borough to portions of Upper Tyrone Township and adjacent communities in both Fayette and Westmoreland counties. A ladies auxiliary was formed in 1970 to assist with fund-raising and support activities. In November 1983 the company broke ground for a new facility at the corner of Jones and Painter streets, where it remains today.

In November 2016, the bridge carrying Brown Street over Jacob's Creek, connecting Scottdale and Everson, was officially named in honor of Staff Sgt. John William Earnesty of Everson and Pfc. Joseph Anthony Petrarca of Scottdale during a public ceremony. Both men, who served in the United States Army, were the only members of their respective communities to be killed in action during the Vietnam War. State Senator Pat Stefano of Connellsville sponsored the legislation to rename the bridge.

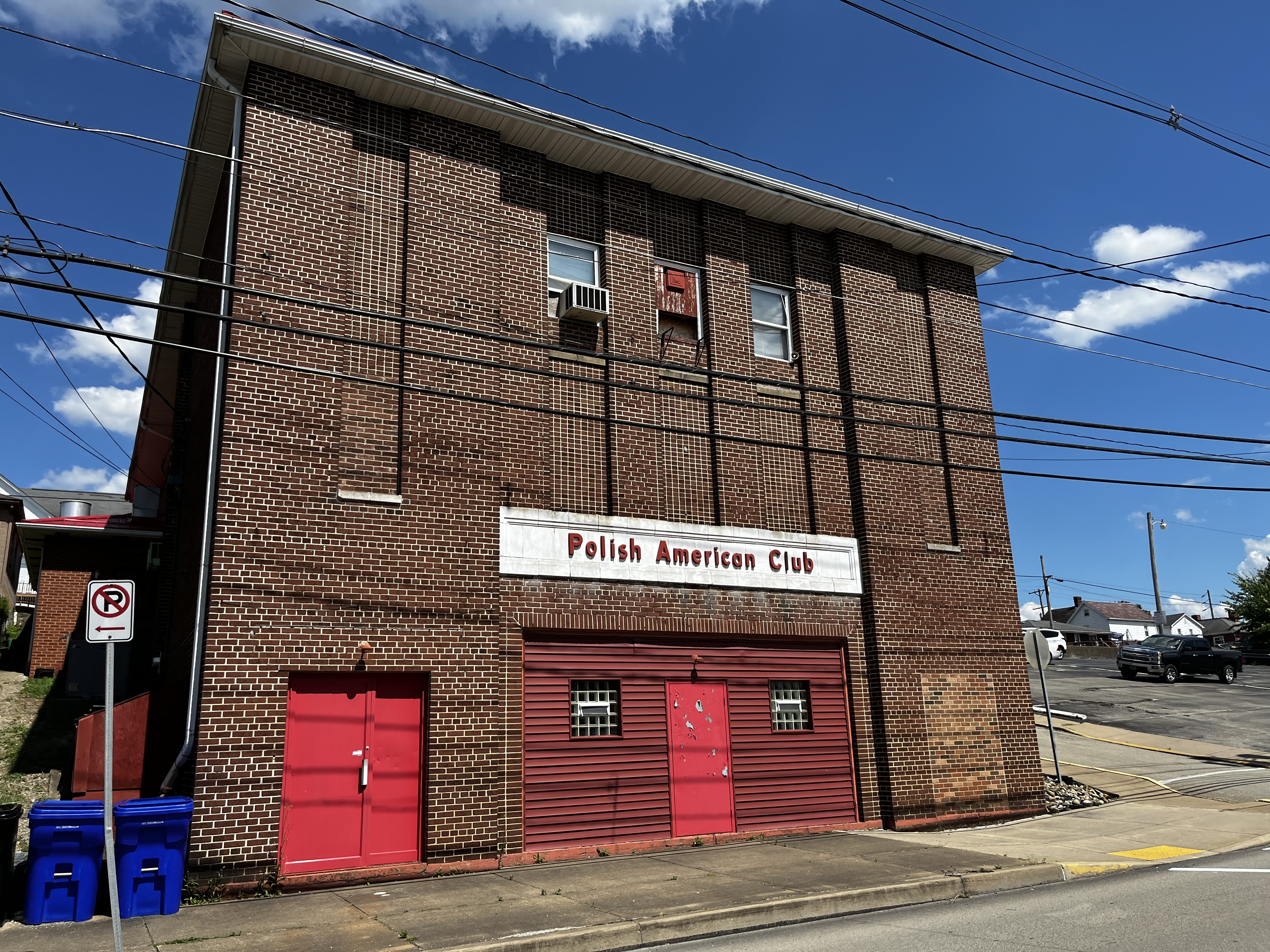
Polish American Club (PAK) on Brown Street

Veterans of Foreign Wars (VFW) Post 595 was chartered in Everson in 1921 to serve veterans who had seen combat overseas. The post relocated to nearby Scottdale for a period before returning to Everson. In the early 21st century the post reported approximately 135 regular members and about 250 social members. It supports local youth sports, school programs, and a range of civic and social initiatives. Its social hall, which has undergone periodic renovations, is made available for community events.

Reflecting the borough's strong Polish heritage, residents organized a Polish-American Club in 1908 to advocate for Polish immigrants working in the coal, coke, and industrial plants of the area. Over time the club broadened its mission to support other ethnic groups and community causes and continues to operate in Everson as of July, 2025.

== Geography ==
Everson is located on the northern edge of Fayette County at 40°5′26″N 79°35′13″W (40.090582, −79.587043). It is on the south side of Jacobs Creek, a tributary of the Youghiogheny River and which forms the border with Westmoreland County. The borough of Scottdale is to the north, directly across the creek from Everson. The city of Connellsville is 6 miles (10 km) to the south.

According to the U.S. Census Bureau, Everson has a total area of 0.19 square miles (0.50 km^{2}), all land.

== Demographics ==
Historical population
Census	Pop.	Note	%±
1890	905		—
1910	1,759		—
1920	1,988		13.0%
1930	1,900		−4.4%
1940	1,809		−4.8%
1950	1,520		−16.0%
1960	1,304		−14.2%
1970	1,143		−12.3%
1980	1,032		−9.7%
1990	939		−9.0%
2000	842		−10.3%
2010	793		−5.8%
2020	771		−2.8%
2021 (est.)	756	▼	−1.9%

As of the 2000 census, there were 842 people, 351 households, and 233 families residing in the borough. The population density was 3,869.6 inhabitants per square mile (1,494.1/km^{2}). There were 385 housing units at an average density of 1,769.4 per square mile (683.2/km^{2}). The racial makeup of the borough was 96.08% White, 3.44% African American, 0.12% Asian, and 0.36% from two or more races.

There were 351 households, out of which 29.6% had children under the age of 18 living with them, 49.0% were married couples living together, 10.0% had a female householder with no husband present, and 33.6% were non-families. 29.3% of all households were made up of individuals, and 16.2% had someone living alone who was 65 years of age or older. The average household size was 2.40 and the average family size was 2.94.

In the borough, the population was spread out, with 22.4% under the age of 18, 7.8% from 18 to 24, 29.6% from 25 to 44, 19.1% from 45 to 64, and 21.0% who were 65 years of age or older. The median age was 39 years. For every 100 females, there were 98.6 males. For every 100 females age 18 and over, there were 91.5 males.

The median income for a household in the borough was $25,500, and the median income for a family was $30,769. Males had a median income of $25,972 versus $17,188 for females. The per capita income for the borough was $12,928. About 13.9% of families and 15.9% of the population were below the poverty line, including 27.8% of those under age 18 and 12.5% of those age 65 or over.

== Education ==
Everson is served by the Southmoreland School District.

== Notable person ==
- B. Smith (Barbara Smith), television personality and restaurant operator
