= Westmoreland =

Westmoreland or Westmorland may refer to:

== Places ==
=== Australia ===
- Westmoreland County, New South Wales, Australia

=== Canada ===
- Westmorland County, New Brunswick, Canada
- Westmorland Parish, New Brunswick, Canada

=== Jamaica ===
- Westmoreland Parish, Jamaica

=== New Zealand ===
- Westmorland, New Zealand, a suburb of Christchurch, New Zealand

=== United Kingdom ===
- Westmorland, a historic county in England
- Westmorland and Furness, a unitary authority area in England

=== United States ===
- Westmorland, California, or Westmoreland
- Westmoreland, Kansas
- Westmoreland, New Hampshire
- Westmoreland, New York, a town
  - Westmoreland (CDP), New York, a census-designated place in the town
- Westmoreland, Queens, New York City
- Westmoreland, Tennessee
- Westmoreland, West Virginia
- Westmoreland County, Pennsylvania
- Westmoreland County, Virginia
- Westmoreland (Toledo, Ohio), a neighborhood
- Westmoreland, Houston, a subdivision in Houston, Texas
- Westmoreland, Portland, Oregon
- Westmoreland City, Pennsylvania
- State of Westmoreland (1784 failed proposal)

== Electoral districts ==
- Westmorland (federal electoral district), a federal electoral district in New Brunswick, Canada
- Westmorland (provincial electoral district), a former provincial electoral district in New Brunswick, Canada
- Westmorland (UK Parliament constituency), before 1885 and 1918–1983
- Westmorland and Lonsdale (UK Parliament constituency), created in 1983
- Westmoreland, Bath, an electoral ward in Bath, England

== Institutions ==
- Westmoreland County Community College, Pennsylvania, United States
- Westmoreland Museum of American Art, Greensburg, Pennsylvania

== Other uses ==
- Westmoreland (railcar), the private railroad car of Henry Clay Frick
- Westmorland (ship), an 18th-century British privateer
- Westmoreland (ship), several ships
- Westmoreland Coal Company, a coal company in the Powder River Basin in Montana and Wyoming
- The Westmorland Gazette, a local newspaper based in Kendal, England
- Westmorland Motorway Services, a motorway service station operator in England
- Westmoreland Glass Company, a company that produced collectible art glass
- Westmoreland Mall, shopping mall in Greensburg, Pennsylvania
- Earl of Westmorland, a title in the Peerage of England
- Westmoreland station (DART), a light rail station in Dallas, Texas

== People with the surname ==
=== Westmoreland ===
- Andrew Westmoreland, President of Samford University in Birmingham, Alabama
- Keith Westmoreland, American politician
- Lynn Westmoreland, American politician from Georgia
- Paul Westmoreland, American musician
- Paul Westmoreland (writer), British children's author
- Wash Westmoreland, British director
- William Westmoreland, American general

=== Westmorland ===
- Charles Henry Westmorland (1856–1916), British brigadier general
- Michele Westmorland, American photographer
- Percy Thuillier Westmorland (1863–1929), British lieutenant-colonel

=== Fictional ===
- Charles Westmoreland, a character from Prison Break
- P.T. Westmorland, recurring character in Orphan Black

== See also ==
- City of Moreland, now known as City of Merri-bek
