= Huntingdon, Pennsylvania (disambiguation) =

Huntingdon, Pennsylvania is borough in and the county seat of Huntingdon County, Pennsylvania.

Other places in Pennsylvania known as Huntingdon include:

- Huntingdon County, Pennsylvania
- Huntingdon Valley, Pennsylvania, a community in Montgomery County
- East Huntingdon Township, Westmoreland County, Pennsylvania
- North Huntingdon Township, Pennsylvania
- South Huntingdon Township, Pennsylvania
