= Frick Building =

Building in Pittsburgh, Pennsylvania

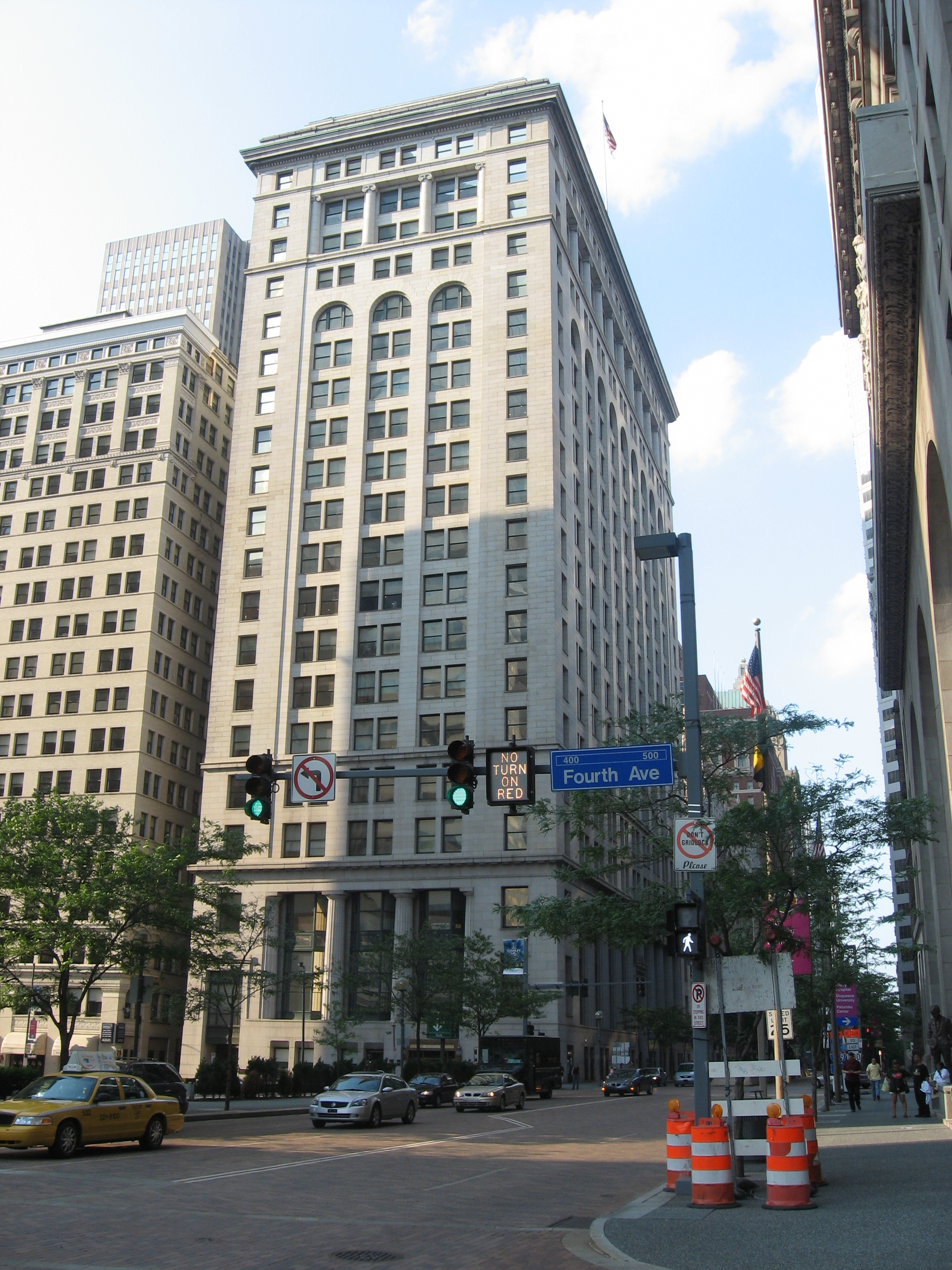
- View of the Frick Building along Grant Street
- Interactive map of the Frick Building area

General information
- Type: Office
- Location: 437 Grant Street, Pittsburgh, Pennsylvania
- Coordinates: 40°26′21″N 79°59′51″W
- Construction started: 1901
- Completed: March 15, 1902
- Opening: March 15, 1902
- Cost: $2 million ($77.4 million today)

Height
- Roof: 330 ft (101 m)

Technical details
- Floor count: 20
- Floor area: 357,474 ft^{2} (33,210 m^{2})
- Lifts/elevators: 11

Design and construction
- Architect: D. H. Burnham & Company
- Developer: Henry Clay Frick
- Main contractor: George A. Fuller Company

Pittsburgh Landmark – PHLF
- Designated: 1974

The Frick Building is one of the major distinctive and recognizable features of Downtown Pittsburgh, Pennsylvania, United States. The tower was built in 1902 by Henry Clay Frick, an industrialist coke producer who created a portfolio of commercial buildings in Pittsburgh. The building is listed on the National Register of Historic Places.

Frick built the tower next to a building owned by his business partner-turned-rival Andrew Carnegie, on the site of Saint Peter Episcopal Church. Frick, who feuded with Carnegie after they split as business associates, had his tower designed to overshadow Carnegie's.

At 330 feet (101 m), the Frick Building was the city's tallest when it opened on March 15, 1902. It originally had 20 floors, but a leveling of the surrounding landscape caused the basement to become the entrance in 1912, so some sources credit the building with 21 stories. Its address is 437 Grant Street, and is also accessible from Forbes and Fifth Avenues.

The building's architect was Daniel H. Burnham of D.H. Burnham & Company, Chicago. Of the eleven executed designs for Pittsburgh by D.H. Burnham & Company, the Frick Building is one of only seven survivors.

The top floor, which was reserved for The Union Club of Pittsburgh, includes a balcony around the perimeter of the building; a high, handcrafted ceiling; and heavy, elaborate brass door fixtures. Originally, Frick used it as his personal office and as a meeting place and social club for wealthy industrialists. On the 19th floor was Frick's personal shower. At the time, no other shower had been built that high above ground level, because water could not easily be pumped that high with the technology of the time. The shower still exists but does not work.

Fittingly for a building created for a man who vowed to be a millionaire by age thirty, the lobby features an elegant stained-glass window by John LaFarge, depicting "Fortune and Her Wheel" (1902). The two bronze sentinel lions (1904) in the lobby were created by sculptor Alexander Proctor. A bust of Frick by sculptor Malvina Hoffman (1923) is displayed in the rear lobby, which extends from Forbes to Fifth Avenue.

For a time, the building housed the headquarters of Old Overholt, Frick's family whiskey business, . which had sales offices around the United States.

Preceded by Four Gateway Center	Pittsburgh Skyscrapers by Height; 330 feet (101 m); 20 floors	Succeeded by Wyndham Grand
Preceded by Farmers Bank Building	Pittsburgh Skyscrapers by Year of Completion; 1902	Succeeded by The Carlyle
