= Henry Overholt =

American whiskey distiller (1739–1813)

- Born: Henrich Oberholtzer; February 5, 1739; Bucks County, Province of Pennsylvania, British America
- Died: March 5, 1813 (aged 74); East Huntingdon Township, Pennsylvania, U.S.
- Resting place: Alverton Cemetery, Alverton, Pennsylvania, U.S.
- Occupation: distiller
- Spouse: Anna Beitler Oberholtzer (1745–1835)
- Children: 6

Henry Overholt (born Henrich Oberholtzer; 1739 – 1813) was an American whiskey distiller and founder of the Overholt Whiskey distillery.

== History ==
In 1800, Overholt moved to southwestern Pennsylvania from Bucks County, Pennsylvania. He is the great-grandfather of Henry Clay Frick. Overholt's son, Abraham Overholt, gave Frick an introduction to successful business operation. The family homestead is located in West Overton, Pennsylvania, where there originally was a farm and distillery. The family processed rye they grew on the farm into whiskey.

Henry's son Abraham Overholt encouraged the production of rye whiskey in 1810 to be sold commercially. Normally, rye whiskey was produced for medicinal purposes. Henry agreed and the Overholts' became the first to produce rye whiskey in Pennsylvania for commercial consumption instead of strictly for medicinal purposes. The Overholts were Mennonites and the church did not approve of the sale of Overholt's "Old Farm Whiskey". The family business expanded when one of Abraham's sons built a second distillery. It operated nearby at Broad Ford and produced the brands known as “Old Overholt” or “Monongahela Rye". The distilleries prospered, resulting in the growth of the family's land holdings to 260 acres. They were able to produce up eight gallons per day-four times more than when they began.

== Business ==
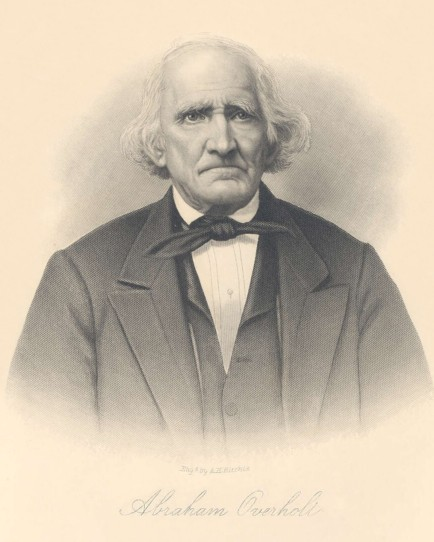
Abraham Overholt

At Henry's death, his sons Abraham and Christian inherited the farm and distillery business. As their business grew, several buildings were erected to address the rising demand of whiskey by the public. Together Abraham and Christian built up and enlarged the distillery which now had the production capacity of almost 200 gallons of rye whiskey per day. Soon after, Abraham bought out Christian's shares of the company and in the mid-1800s went into business with his two sons, Jacob and Henry. At this time, Abraham renamed the business, Abraham Overholt & Company.

Abraham Overholt was the grandfather to Henry Clay Frick. The Abraham Overholt & Company operated until the company was closed in 1919 because of the passage of the Prohibition amendment. Later, Helen Clay Frick, daughter of Henry Clay Frick, donated the distillery properties to be used for a museum and part of the restored historic West Overton Village.

The Overholt distillery was purchased by Henry's granddaughter Helen Clay Frick and refurbished into a museum. The brand name Old Overholt® Straight Rye Whiskey is currently owned by the Jim Beam company.

== Archives ==
The collection of documents related to the life and business of Henry Overholt collection is housed at the Archives Service Center, University of Pittsburgh Library System, University of Pittsburgh. The archived materials consist of Distillery postcards, Distillery 100th anniversary pamphlets, Distillery mailing pamphlets, Distillery checks, Obituary of Abraham Overholt, View of property of A.S.R. Overholt & Company, West Overton, Pa., journals and a ledger.

== See also ==
- Old Overholt
- West Overton, Pennsylvania
