= Bud Hulsey =

American politician (born 1949)

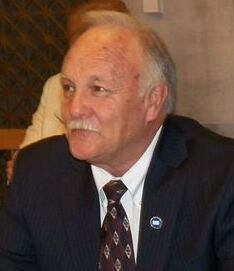
- Hulsey in 2015

Member of the Tennessee House of Representatives from the 2nd district
- In office January 13, 2015 – November 3, 2026
- Preceded by: Tony Shipley
- Succeeded by: Gary Stidham

Personal details
- Born: Charles Nolan Hulsey; May 30, 1949 (age 77)
- Party: Republican
- Children: 3
- Education: Bob Jones University (BA)
- Website: House website

Charles Nolan "Bud" Hulsey (born May 30, 1949) is an American politician who was a member of the Tennessee House of Representatives for the 2nd district. A member of the Republican Party, he represented the district, encompassing parts of Sullivan County, from 2015 to 2026.

== Early life and education ==
Charles Nolan Hulsey was born on May 30, 1949. He graduated from Durango High School in Durango, Colorado in 1967. He then attended Bob Jones University in Greenville, South Carolina, where he graduated with a BA in education.

He later completed post-graduate work with the FBI National Academy through the University of Virginia.

== Career ==
After leaving university, Hulsey joined the police department in Kingsport, Tennessee. He remained at the department for 36 years, attaining the rank of lieutenant. He also owns Burlington Logistics, a trucking company based in the Tri-Cities region.

== Tennessee House of Representatives ==
=== Elections ===
In 2014, Hulsey challenged three-term incumbent Tony Shipley for the Republican nomination in the 2nd district of the Tennessee House of Representatives. During the primary campaign, Hulsey's campaign chair, former representative Michael Locke, was killed in a hit-and-run incident involving a drunk driver while placing campaign signs. Hulsey secured the nomination, defeating Shipley with roughly 60 percent of the primary vote. He then defeated independent J. R. Enfield in the general election.

In his five subsequent re-electin campaigns, Hulsey ran without facing a primary challenge. In 2016, he defeated Democrat challenger J. S. Moore. In 2018 and 2020, he defeated Democrat challenger Arvil Love. In 2022, he defeated a write-in candidate with over 99 percent of the vote. In 2024, he won re-election uncontested.

=== Tenure ===
In 2015, Hulsey sponsored the Ben Woodruff and Mike Locke Act, a bill to require individuals convicted of vehicular manslaughter to serve at least 60 percent of their sentence before becoming eligible for parole, up from the previous 30 percent. Hulsey later worked with state senator Jon Lundberg on the legislation, which was enacted by the Tennessee General Assembly in 2019.

In 2021, amid the COVID-19 pandemic, Hulsey introduced legislation seeking to protect religious exemptions and prohibit mandatory vaccination.

In 2023, the Tennessee House voted on resolutions to remove three Democratic representatives — Gloria Johnson, Justin Jones, and Justin J. Pearson — for their participation in a protest over gun violence on the house floor after the Covenant School shooting. Hulsey voted to expel all three representatives. Pearson and Jones were expelled, while Johnson was not.

In 2024, Hulsey introduced legislation to ban lab-grown meat. He argued that exposing consumers to lab-grown meat violated the Nuremberg Code.

=== Committee assignments ===
==== Leadership positions ====
Hulsey has held the following committee leadership positions:

- Chair, Appropriations and Oversight Committee (114th General Assembly)
- Co-Chair, Joint Ways and Means Committee (114th General Assembly)
- Chair, Criminal Justice Committee (113th General Assembly)
- Chair, Corrections Subcommittee (111th–112th General Assemblies)
- Vice-Chair, State Government Committee (110th General Assembly)

==== Committee memberships ====
Hulsey has also served as a member of the following committees and subcommittees:

- Agriculture and Natural Resources Committee (109th–114th General Assemblies)
  - Agriculture and Natural Resources Subcommittee (111th–113th General Assemblies)
- Finance, Ways and Means Committee (114th General Assembly)
- Private Acts Committee (114th General Assembly)
- Criminal Justice Subcommittee (113th General Assembly)
- Calendars and Rules Committee (113th General Assembly)
- State Government Committee (109th–112th General Assemblies)
  - State Government Subcommittee (109th General Assembly)
- Judiciary Committee (111th General Assembly)

== Electoral history ==
Electoral history of Bud Hulsey
Year	Office	District	Party	Primary			General			Result	Ref.
Year	Office	District	Party	Total	%	P.	Total	%	P.	Result	Ref.
2014	Tennessee House of Representatives	2	Republican	5,046	59.81%	1st	12,249	84.18%	1st	Won	
2016	Tennessee House of Representatives	2	Republican	3,805	100.00%	1st	20,334	80.45%	1st	Won	
2018	Tennessee House of Representatives	2	Republican	8,482	100.00%	1st	17,455	75.90%	1st	Won	
2020	Tennessee House of Representatives	2	Republican	8,668	100.00%	1st	23,315	77.12%	1st	Won	
2022	Tennessee House of Representatives	2	Republican	2,986	100.00%	1st	15,359	99.59%	1st	Won	
2024	Tennessee House of Representatives	2	Republican	7,290	100.00%	1st	26,619	100.00%	1st	Won	
