= The New Negro World =

American newspaper, 1892 to 1920s

- Type: Weekly newspaper
- Founder: Joseph Houser
- Founded: 1892
- Ceased publication: mid 1920s

The New Negro World was a four-page weekly newspaper, published every Saturday, which provided coverage of national and global news alongside local affairs. Primarily targeting African-American democrats in St. Paul and Minneapolis, Minnesota, during the late 19th century, it served as a democratic platform addressing the concerns of its readership. The publication was founded and managed by Joseph Houser, an anti-imperialist writer. The first addition was published in 1892, and it is unknown when the final publication was released, however it estimated to be within the mid 1920s.

== The First Edition ==
In July 1892, a local strike involving Andrew Carnegie gained national attention. The article covering the strike was titled "Carnegie, The Golden Image." Carnegie, a prominent industrialist, faced controversy when Henry Clay Frick, CEO of Carnegie Steel, attempted to reduce wages at the Homestead plant near Pittsburgh. On the 23rd, of the same month, The New Negro World, the weekly publication, urged solidarity with the strikers, citing constitutional principles and biblical references. It discussed the workers' sacrifice and invoked the imagery of Moses leading the Israelites to freedom. The publication regularly integrated biblical themes, including a church directory for local prayer meetings in each edition.

In the subsequent week, commencing on July 30th, the featured article "Cleveland: The Man of Destiny" deliberated on the Republican Chicago Convention. This convention served as a platform for formally acknowledging presidential and vice-presidential candidates for the upcoming election. The discussion predominantly centered on Grover Cleveland, the Democratic nominee, characterizing him as an independent candidate known for his transparent political stances. The article highlighted Cleveland's reputation for avoiding pandering to sectionalism or racial affiliations.
