= Tennessee House of Representatives 2nd district =

State legislative district in Tennessee

Tennessee's 2nd State House of Representatives district
- Map of Tennessee House districts, with the 2nd District shaded in red
Representative
Bud Hulsey; R–Kingsport
- Demographics: 91.8% White; 1.9% Black; 3% Hispanic; 0.5% Asian; 0.2% Other; 2.4% Multiracial
- Population (2024): 67,773

The Tennessee House of Representatives 2nd district is one of 99 legislative districts included in the lower house of the Tennessee General Assembly. The district is located in Sullivan County and the Tri-Cities area, situated around the cities of Kingsport and Blountville. The district has been represented by Bud Hulsey, since 2015.

== Demographics ==
According to the 2024 American Community Survey, District 2 had a population of approximately 67,773.

- 91.8% of the district is White
- 1.9% of the district is African American
- 3% of the district is Hispanic
- 0.5% of the district is Asian
- 0.2% of the district is Other
- 2.4% of the district is another race or 2 or more races.

Detailed demographic information on the district is also available through Statistical Atlas.

== List of representatives ==
Representative	Party	Years of service	General Assembly	Residence
Donald Hood	Democratic	1979-1981	91st	Kingsport
Ruth Montgomery	Republican	1981-1989	92nd-95th	Kingsport
Alan Hubbard	Republican	1989-1993	96th-97th	Kingsport
Keith Westmoreland	Republican	1993-2001	98th-101st	Kingsport
Michael K. Locke	Republican	2001-2003	102nd	Kingsport
Nathan Vaughn	Democratic	2003-2009	103rd-105th	Kingsport
Tony Shipley	Republican	2009-2015	106th-108th	Kingsport
Bud Hulsey	Republican	2015–2026	109th-114th	Kingsport
Gary Stidham	Republican	2026–present	115th	

=== Federal and statewide results ===
Year	Office	Results
2018	Senate	Blackburn 70.03 - 29.97%
