= Gary Stidham =

American politician

Member-elect of the Tennessee House of Representatives from the 2nd district
- Assuming office January 12, 2027
- Succeeding: Bud Hulsey

Personal details
- Party: Republican
- Website: Campaign website

Gary Stidham is an American politician. A member of the Republican Party, he is the member-elect for the Tennessee House of Representatives for the 2nd district. He was elected at the 2026 election.
