= Nathan Vaughn =

American politician

Member of the Tennessee House of Representatives from the 2nd district
- In office January 14, 2003 – January 13, 2009
- Preceded by: Michael K. Locke
- Succeeded by: Tony Shipley

Kingsport City Alderman
- In office 1997–2002

Personal details
- Born: May 19, 1953 (age 73)
- Party: Democratic
- Education: King College

Nathan Vaughn (born May 19, 1953) is a Tennessee politician. He was elected to the 103rd, 104th, and 105th General Assemblies as the member of the Tennessee House of Representatives representing the 2nd district, which is a part of Sullivan County. He was narrowly defeated by Republican challenger Tony Shipley in 2008 by just 326 votes.

While serving in the General Assembly, Vaughn was a member of the Children and Family Affairs Committee, of the Finance, the Ways, and Means Committee, and of the Transportation Committee. He was also a member of the Public Transportation and Highways Subcommittee, the House Domestic Relations Subcommittee, and the Joint Select Oversight Committee on Education.

Vaughn works as an insurance agent and continues to live in the town of Kingsport, Tennessee, United States. He graduated with a bachelor's degree in psychology from King College in 1975. He served as an Alderman in Kingsport from 1997 until 2002 and is also a former Vice Mayor. He ran for Mayor of Kingsport in 2015 (losing to John Clark) and 2019 (losing to Patrick Shull).
