= West Overton, Pennsylvania =

Historic area in Pennsylvania, US

- West Overton Historic District
- U.S. National Register of Historic Places
- U.S. Historic district
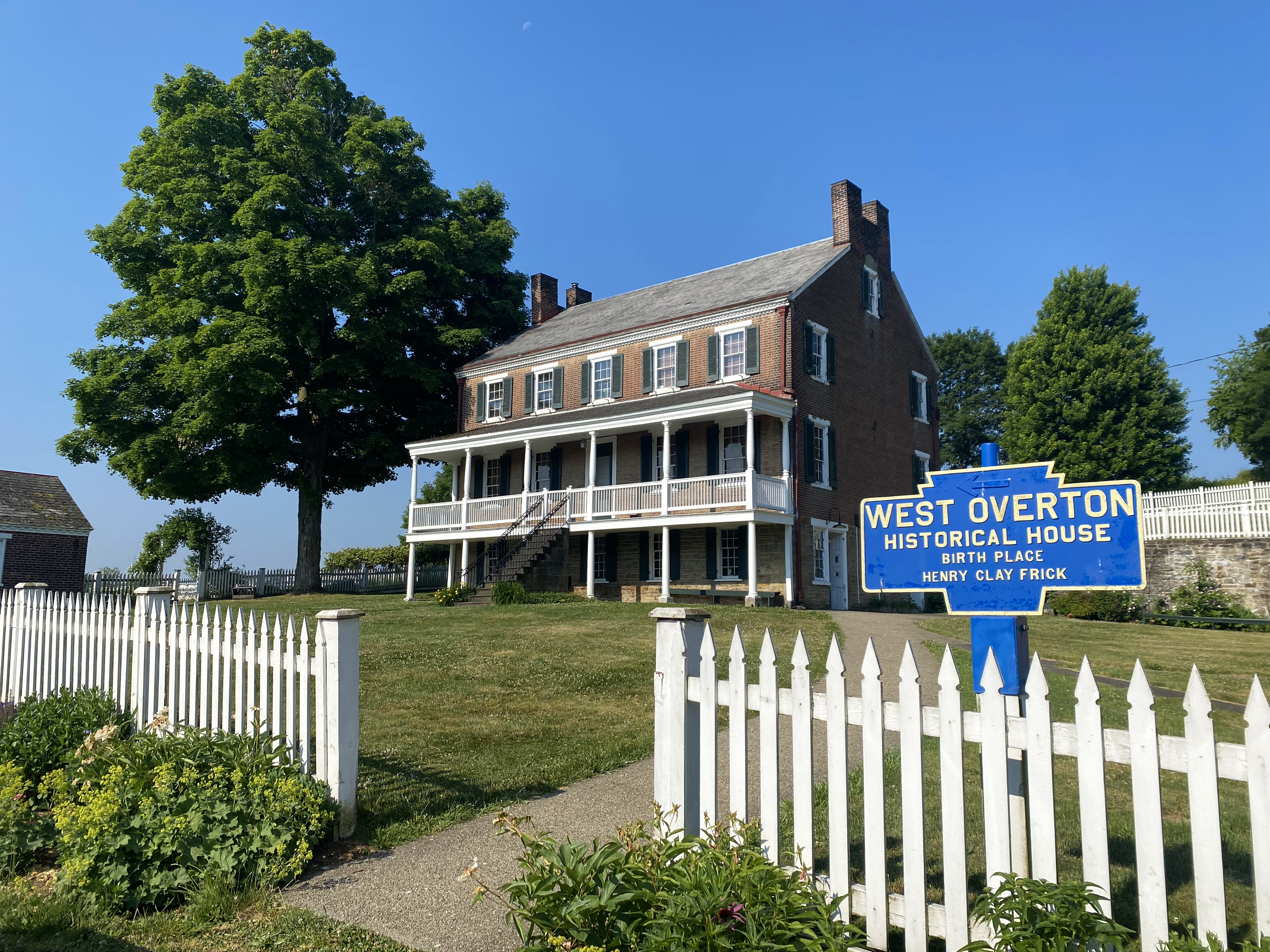
- 1838 Overholt Homestead

- Location within Pennsylvania Location within the United States
- Location: Frick Ave., East Huntingdon Township, Pennsylvania
- Coordinates: 40°06′59″N 79°33′59″W
- Area: 12 acres (4.9 ha)
- Built: 1850
- Built by: Abraham Overholt
- Architectural style: Greek Revival, Vernacular Greek Revival
- NRHP reference No.: 85001572
- Added to NRHP: July 18, 1985

West Overton is a historic village located approximately 40 miles (64 km) southeast of Pittsburgh, in East Huntingdon Township, Westmoreland County, Pennsylvania, United States. It is located near PA 819 between the towns of Mount Pleasant and Scottdale. Known as the birthplace of industrialist and art collector Henry Clay Frick, it is also the original site of the distillery founded by his great-grandfather, Henry Overholt, and later operated by his grandfather, Abraham Overholt. This distillery is famous for producing Old Overholt rye whiskey.

== History ==
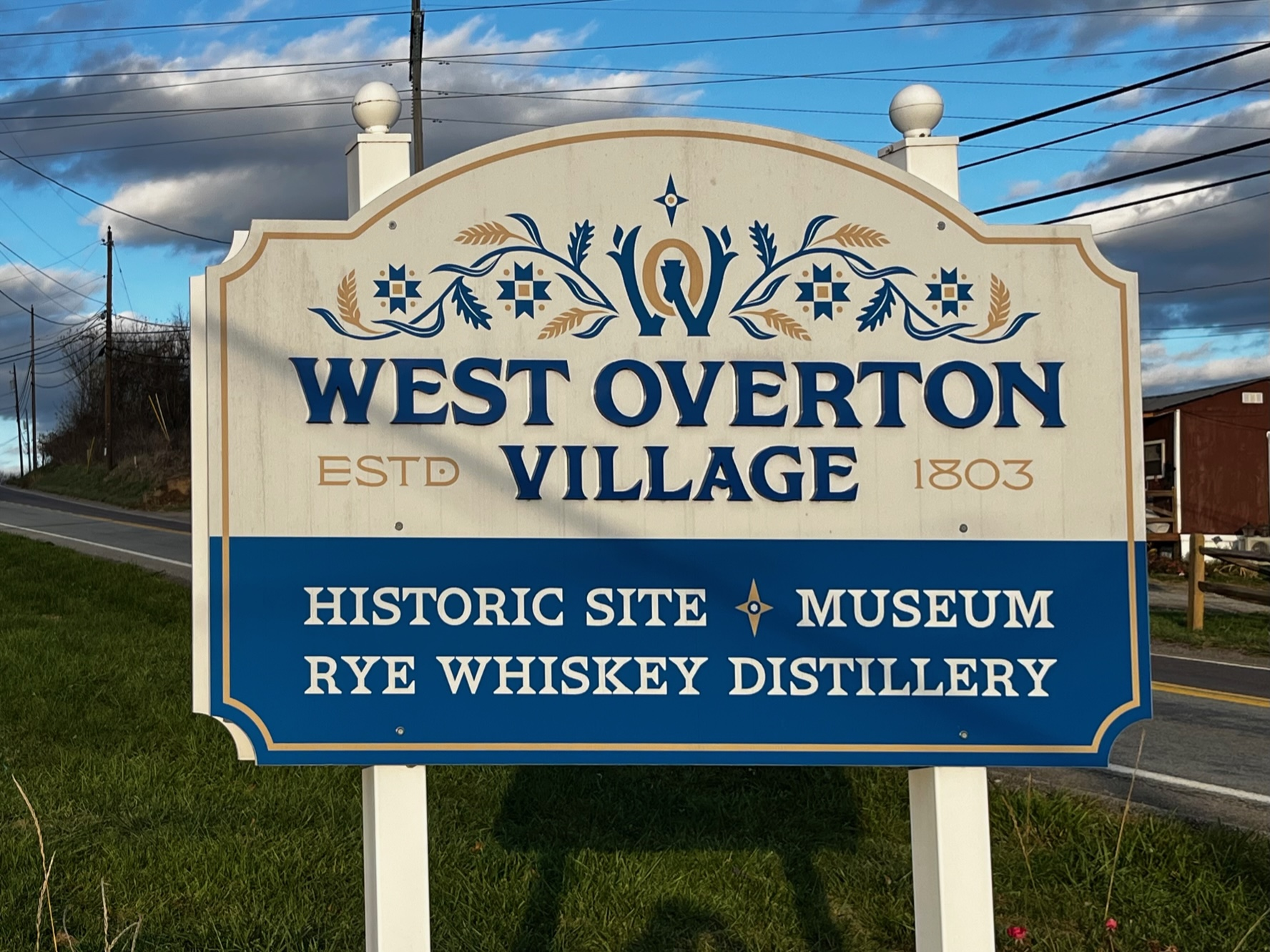
Sign at the entrance to West Overton located on Pennsylvania Route 819

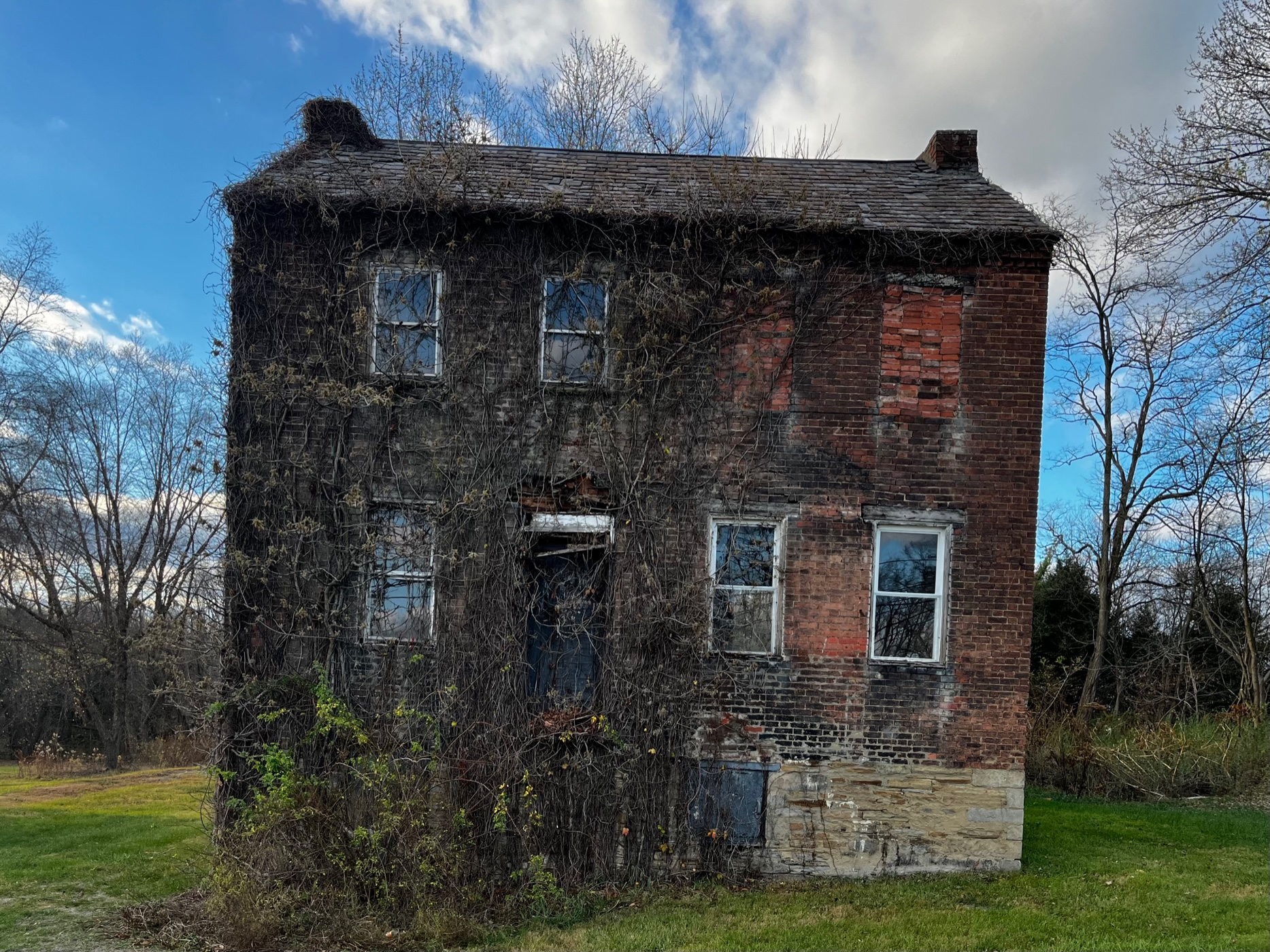
Former worker house at West Overton

West Overton was established in 1800 by German Mennonites from Bucks County, who were led by Henry Overholt. Initially, they operated as self-sufficient farmers, but in 1803, Henry's son, Abraham Overholt, established a distillery. The distillery quickly expanded, as Overholt's whiskey became popular locally and regionally. This was the origin of Old Overholt whiskey, one of the country's oldest continuously produced whiskey brands, known for its rye whiskey. As the distillery flourished, he began expanding his industrial interests. By the 1830s, he constructed a gristmill and additional whiskey stills, making West Overton a thriving industrial hub in the early 19th century. Production at the distillery ceased during the Prohibition era in the 1920s, when the production and sale of alcohol were banned nationwide.

When prohibition laws were repealed in 1933 during the Great Depression, federal farm subsidies were introduced, benefiting crops like corn but initially excluding rye. As a result, bourbon, which relies heavily on corn, became more economically viable to produce than rye whiskey. Consequently, rye whiskey never regained its former status locally. In 1927, the Overholt Company changed ownership, purchased by National Distillers, which was later acquired by American Brands and its subsidiary, James B. Beam Distilling Co., in 1987. Today, Old Overholt rye whiskey is produced by Suntory Global Spirits in Kentucky.

One of Overholt's grandsons, Henry Clay Frick, who was born at West Overton in 1849, would go on to become one of America's most influential industrialists. Frick started his career at West Overton and later expanded into the coal and coke industries, which were vital to steel production. Frick eventually partnered with Andrew Carnegie, playing a pivotal role in the development of the U.S. steel industry.

== Present day and museum ==
Overton Stock Farm with the Distillery in the background

Today the village operates as a museum complex and is an example of a 19th-century rural industrial village. It is the only pre-American Civil War village still intact in Pennsylvania.

The museum has undergone a complete renovation and will focus on the Overholt industries of whiskey distillation, grist milling and coal and coke operations. The museum was scheduled to reopen for tours in August 2012 with the Overholt Homestead reopening in June 2013.

Beginning with the re-opening of Overton stock farm in 2012, the barn has become a wedding venue, working in partnership with Scottdale's Carson's Catering business.

On April 21, 2020, a vehicle crashed into the former Abraham Overholt homestead, resulting in the vehicle's four occupants being life-lighted to a nearby hospital and damaging the exterior of the structure. The home was repaired shortly after the incident.

In October 2020, West Overton Distilling returned to its original form when production of Monongahela rye whiskey at West Overton's Educational Distillery restarted.

== West Overton Historic District ==
West Overton Historic District is a national historic district located at East Huntingdon Township, Westmoreland County, Pennsylvania. It encompasses 19 contributing buildings in the village of West Overton. They are a collection of mid-19th century buildings in a vernacular Greek Revival style. It includes the Christian S. Overholt Store and House, Abraham Overholt Homestead (1838), and Overholt Mill (1859). The springhouse of the Abraham Overholt Homestead is the birthplace of Henry Clay Frick (1849–1919).

It was added to the National Register of Historic Places in 1985.

== See also ==
- Henry Overholt
- Old Overholt
- Henry Clay Frick
