= Keith Westmoreland =

American politician and businessman (1946–2002)

Member of the Tennessee House of Representatives from the 2nd district
- In office 1993 – June 19, 2002
- Preceded by: Alan Hubbard
- Succeeded by: Michael K. Locke

Sullivan County Executive
- In office 1986–1990

Personal details
- Born: August 26, 1946 Kingsport, Tennessee, U.S.
- Died: June 19, 2002 (aged 55) Kingsport, Tennessee, U.S.
- Party: Republican
- Education: University of Tennessee; East Tennessee State University; Walters State Community College
- Criminal information
- Criminal charges: 7 counts of indecent exposure to a minor

B. Keith Westmoreland (August 26, 1946 – June 19, 2002) was an American businessman and Republican politician from Tennessee.

== Education ==
Born in Kingsport, Tennessee, Westmoreland served in the United States Air Force. He went to University of Tennessee and Walters State Community College and then received his bachelor's degree in criminal justice from East Tennessee State University.

== Career ==
Westmoreland worked in the Sullivan County, Tennessee sheriff department and then as served as Sullivan County, Tennessee County Executive from 1986 to 1990. He then served in the Tennessee House of Representatives as a Republican from 1993 to 2002.

Westmoreland shot himself at his home in Kingsport, Tennessee six days after being charged with seven counts of indecent exposure to a minor.
