= Westmoreland (ship) =

Several vessels have been named Westmoreland:

- Westmoreland (1783 ship) was launched in Yarmouth. Between 1800 and 1804 she made two voyages as a slave ship in the triangular trade in enslaved people. A French privateer captured her during her second voyage but the Royal Navy recaptured her and she completed her voyage. The registers continued to carry her for a few years but with stale data; she actually made a voyage in 1805 to Demerara. On her way a privateer captured her.
- Westmoreland (1791 ship) was launched on the Thames. She made two voyages as a slave ship in the triangular trade in enslaved people. Between these voyages she cruised as a privateer for some months. She then traded between Britain and the Mediterranean until she was last listed in 1814.
- Westmoreland (1800 ship) was launched at Whitby. She first sailed as a West Indiaman. From 1816 to 1821, and then again from 1823 to 1825, she sailed to India under a license from the British East India Company (EIC). Her crew abandoned her at sea in October 1825. She eventually floated ashore on the coast of France and was salvaged.
- Westmoreland (1808 ship) was a ship launched at Whithaven as a West Indiaman. She was lost on 5 December 1822.
- Westmoreland (1817 ship) was launched at Hull. She sailed to India under a license from the British East India Company (EIC). Next, she sailed to Australia with passengers. From Sydney she visited New Zealand, Tahiti, and Valparaiso, before returning to England. She then traded widely, to Russia, North America, West Africa, and India again. She was condemned at Saint Helena on 29 October 1845 as she was returning from the coast of Africa.
- Westmoreland (1832 ship) was built at Lynn. She made three voyages transporting convicts to New South Wales. She was last listed in 1847.
- Westmoreland (1852 ship) was built at Philadelphia. A fire damaged her greatly in 1873 and her owners sold her.
