= Percy Thuillier Westmorland =

British military officer

Lieutenant-Colonel Percy Thuillier Westmorland CMG DSO
- Born: 25 July 1863; Kensington, London, England
- Died: 4 June 1929 (aged 65); London, England
- Military career
- Allegiance: United Kingdom
- Branch: British Army
- Awards: CMG; DSO; Mentioned in despatches x3

Lieutenant-Colonel Percy Thuillier Westmorland CMG DSO (25 July 1863 – 4 June 1929) commanded the 10th Battalion, London Regiment, and the 151st (Durham Light Infantry) Brigade during World War I. For his dedication to service during his army career he was three times mentioned in despatches and made CMG and DSO.

After the war, Westmorland retired from the army and went into business with Sir Henry Lunn, one of the founders of Lunn Poly, and became a director of the Palace Hotel and Grand Hôtel des Alpes, Mürren, and the Palace Hotel, Montana.

Westmorland's maternal grandfather was Sir Henry Thuillier who served as Surveyor General of India. His brother in law was Brigadier-General Clifton Inglis Stockwell, the British officer who initiated the 1914 Christmas truce football match at Frelinghien with Baron Maximilian von Sinner.

== Life ==
Percy Thuillier Westmorland was born in Kensington on 25 July 1863, the son of Colonel Isaac Peat Westmorland and Rose Julia Westmorland (née Thuillier). Westmorland's mother was the eldest daughter of Sir Henry Thuillier who was Surveyor General of India and responsible for introducing the first national postage stamp to India. His first cousin was Brigadier-General Charles Henry Westmorland CB.

Westmorland was educated at Wellington College and the Royal Military College, Sandhurst. In 1882 he was commissioned into the Bedfordshire Regiment transferring to the West India Regiment in 1892. Westmorland saw service in the Gambia Expedition against Fodey Silah in 1894, where he was mentioned in despatches, and in the Ashanti Expedition of 1895–96.

In the Second Boer War, Westmorland served as staff officer at Glencoe and was afterwards in command at St Helena. In 1901 he served in a further expedition in Gambia before joining the Royal Warwickshire Regiment in the Zakka Khel and Mommand Expeditions of 1908 where he was again mentioned in despatches and made a Companion of the Distinguished Service Order.

Westmorland retired from the army in 1912 but rejoined on the commencement of World War I. He went to France in 1915 where he commanded the 10th Battalion, London Regiment, and, promoted to temporary brigadier general in May 1916, took over the 151st (Durham Light Infantry) Brigade from Major General John Shea. For his dedication to service he was once again mentioned in despatches and made CMG.

After the war, Westmorland retired from the army and went into business with Sir Henry Lunn, one of the founders of Lunn Poly, and became a director of the Palace Hotel and Grand Hôtel des Alpes, Mürren, and the Palace Hotel, Montana.

In 1902, Westmorland married Olivia Amelia Hale in Kensington. He died on 4 June 1929.
