= Charles Henry Westmorland =

British general

Brigadier-General Charles Henry Westmorland CB
- Born: 30 June 1856; Kensington, London, England
- Died: 9 February 1916 (aged 59); Wingham, Kent, England
- Relatives: First cousin: Percy Thuillier Westmorland
- Military career
- Allegiance: United Kingdom
- Branch: British Army; British India
- Awards: CB; Mentioned in despatches

Brigadier-General Charles Henry Westmorland CB (30 June 1856 – 9 February 1916) was in command of the Karachi Brigade between 1907 and 1910.

== Life ==
Charles Henry Westmorland was born on 30 June 1856. He was the son of Frederick George Westmorland and Rosa Isabella Josephine (née Joyce). His first cousin was Percy Thuillier Westmorland.

Westmorland entered the army in 1874. He saw active service in the Afghan War (1878-9), the Burmese expedition (1887-9), on the North West Frontier (1897-8) and in China (1900). In 1907 he took command of the Karachi Brigade, was made Companion of the Order of the Bath (CB) in the 1908 Birthday Honours and relinquished command of the Brigade in 1910. Westmorland retired in 1912 with the honorary rank of Brigadier-General. At that time he was resident at Hyde Park Mansions, Marylebone Road, London.

Westmorland died in the home of his sister in Wingham, Kent, England, on 9 February 1916.
