= Tony Shipley =

American politician (born 1953)

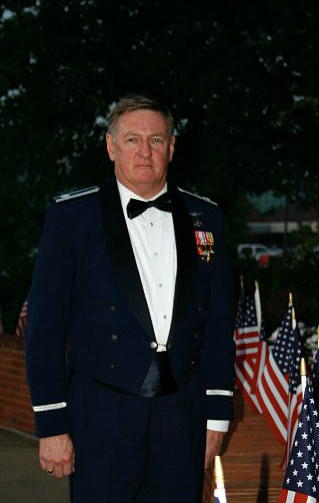

Member of the Tennessee House of Representatives from the 2nd district
- In office January 13, 2009 – January 13, 2015
- Preceded by: Nathan Vaughn
- Succeeded by: Bud Hulsey

Personal details
- Born: August 23, 1953 (age 73) Blountville, Tennessee
- Party: Republican
- Spouse: Susan
- Education: University of Tennessee, B.A.
- Awards: Bronze Star
- Website: http://www.tonyshipley.com/

Military service
- Branch/service: US Air Force
- Years of service: 23
- Rank: Lieutenant colonel

Tony Shipley (born August 23, 1953) is a former State Representative for the Tennessee House of Representatives 2nd District in Sullivan County.

Born in Blountville, Tennessee, Shipley is a graduate of Sullivan Central High School and also a 1976 graduate of the University of Tennessee with a Bachelor of Arts degree.

After retiring from the U.S. Air Force as a lieutenant colonel, Shipley taught Tennessee history and world geography in Sullivan County middle schools.

Shipley is a general in the Tennessee State Guard.

== Early political career ==
=== Political campaigns ===
Shipley was elected to the Tennessee House of Representatives as a member of the 106th General Assembly in 2008 after defeating three-term incumbent Nathan Vaughn In 2010, he was re-elected to the 107th General Assembly, again defeating Democrat Nathan Vaughn, this time with more than 60% of the electorate. In 2012, Shipley was reelected for a third consecutive term with almost 70% of the electorate. In 2014, Shipley lost the Republican nomination to Bud Hulsey after earning only 40% of the primary votes cast. In 2016, Shipley reappeared in state politics to run for the Tennessee state senate 4th district seat being vacated by Lt. Governor Ron Ramsey. However, Jon Lundberg was elected to fill that seat.

Tennessee House of Representatives, 2nd Representative District, 2008
Party	Candidate	Votes	%
Republican	Tony Shipley	12,858	50.63
Democratic	Nathan Vaughn	12,532	49.37

Tennessee House of Representatives, 2nd Representative District, 2010
Party	Candidate	Votes	%
Republican	Tony Shipley	10,183	61.92
Democratic	Nathan Vaughn	6,262	38.08

Tennessee House of Representatives, 2nd Representative District, 2012
Party	Candidate	Votes	%
Republican	Tony Shipley	16,764	68.26
Democratic	Bruce Dotson	7,794	31.74

=== Notable recognition ===
Shipley served in the 106th General Assembly on the House Health and Human Services and Transportation Committees as well as the Public Safety and Professional Occupations Sub-committees. He was awarded Legislator of the Year 2009, his first year in office, by both the American Automobile Association and the Tennessee Psychological Association.

In reference to his Legislator of the Year award from the Tennessee Psychological Association, TPA President Mark Phillips stated, "This comes on behalf of his tireless efforts to ensure access to appropriate mental health care to all Tennesseans. Rep. Shipley sponsored TPA-backed legislation recognizing that mental health problems need mental health specialists." In addition, TPA Director of Legislative and Professional Affairs Lance Laurence stated, "Tony Shipley's experience in the United States military and as a private sector critical care Paramedic provides him with a unique understanding of the problems with the delivery of mental health services."

In 2010, his second year in office, he was selected as Legislator of the Year by the Rural Health Association of Tennessee.

=== Other ===
On February 3, 2012, Shipley came to the aid of a man outside of a Nashville Hotel who had gone into a seizure. Shipley, a Kingsport native with training as a paramedic, came to the aid of a Franklin-based Passport Health Communications Inc. 34-year-old employee. Passport Vice President Max Carter stated, ""As a result of Representative Shipley's quick action what could have been a truly horrible situation was averted. Moreover, in a time when many healthcare professionals, and just people in general, are afraid to assist in similar situations due to fear of lawsuits, etc, I thought Mr. Shipley's actions should be noted. I have no idea what his training or background is but he was relaying vitals to 911 like a pro and telling us exactly what to do."

=== Committee assignments ===
Shipley served in the 107th General Assembly as:

- Secretary, House Republican Caucus
- Secretary, House Government Operations Committee,
- Chair, Joint Government Operations Health and Education Subcommittee
- Member, House Transportation Committee
- Member, House General Sub-committee of Transportation
- Member, Joint Fiscal Review Committee
- Member, Joint Committee on Diabetes Prevention
- Chair, Republican Caucus Task Force on Energy

=== Education ===
- B.A., University of Tennessee, Knoxville
- Post Graduate Intelligence Program (PGIP) at National Defense Intelligence College, Washington D.C.
- Air Command and Staff College, Maxwell Air Force Base, AL
- Marine Corps Command and Staff College, Camp Smith, HI
- Paramedic, Northeast State Community College, Blountville, TN
- Critical Care Paramedic, Roane State Community College, Knoxville, TN
