= Paul Westmoreland (writer) =

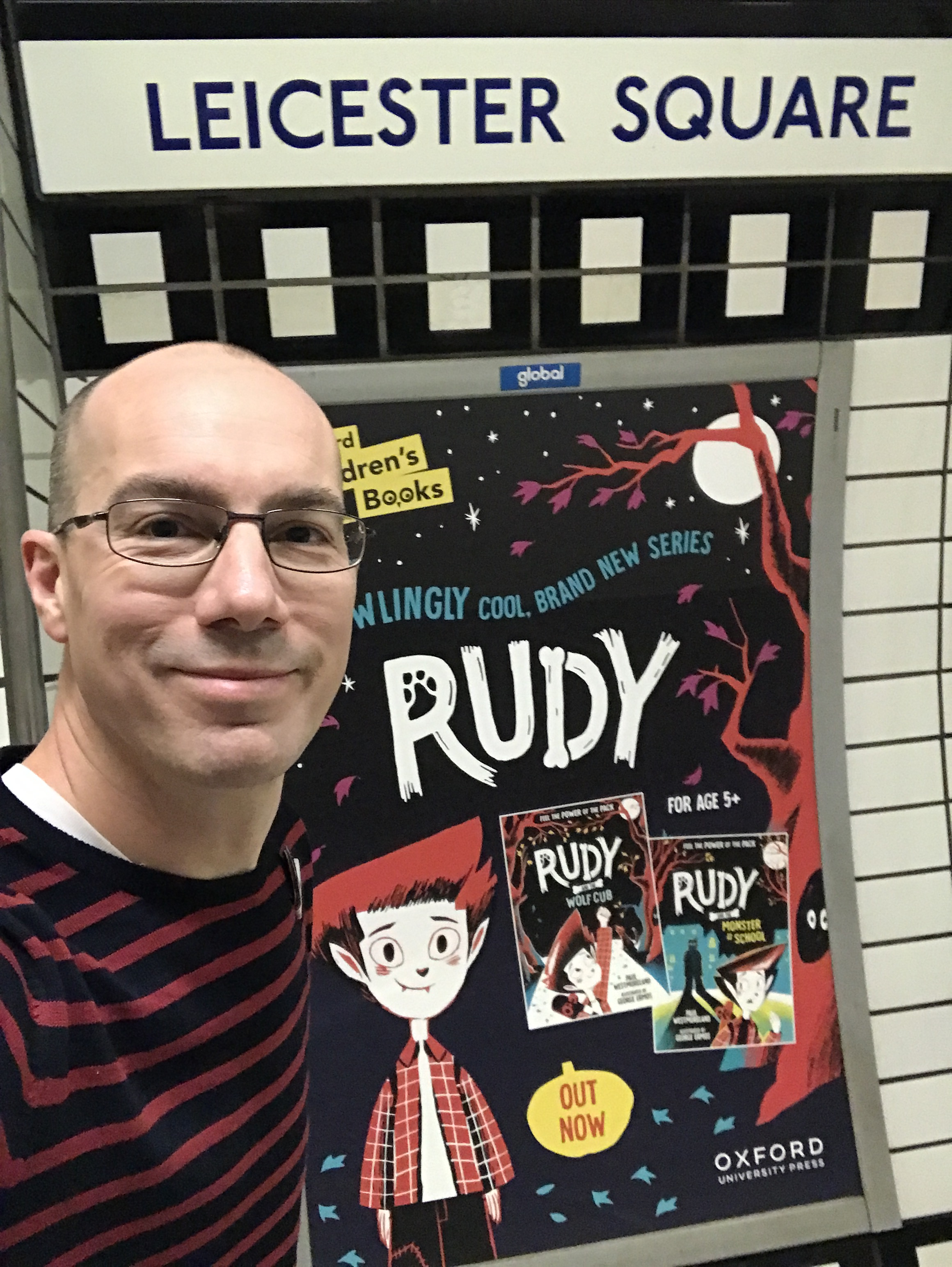
The Rudy series was launched with a media campaign that included posters on the London Underground.

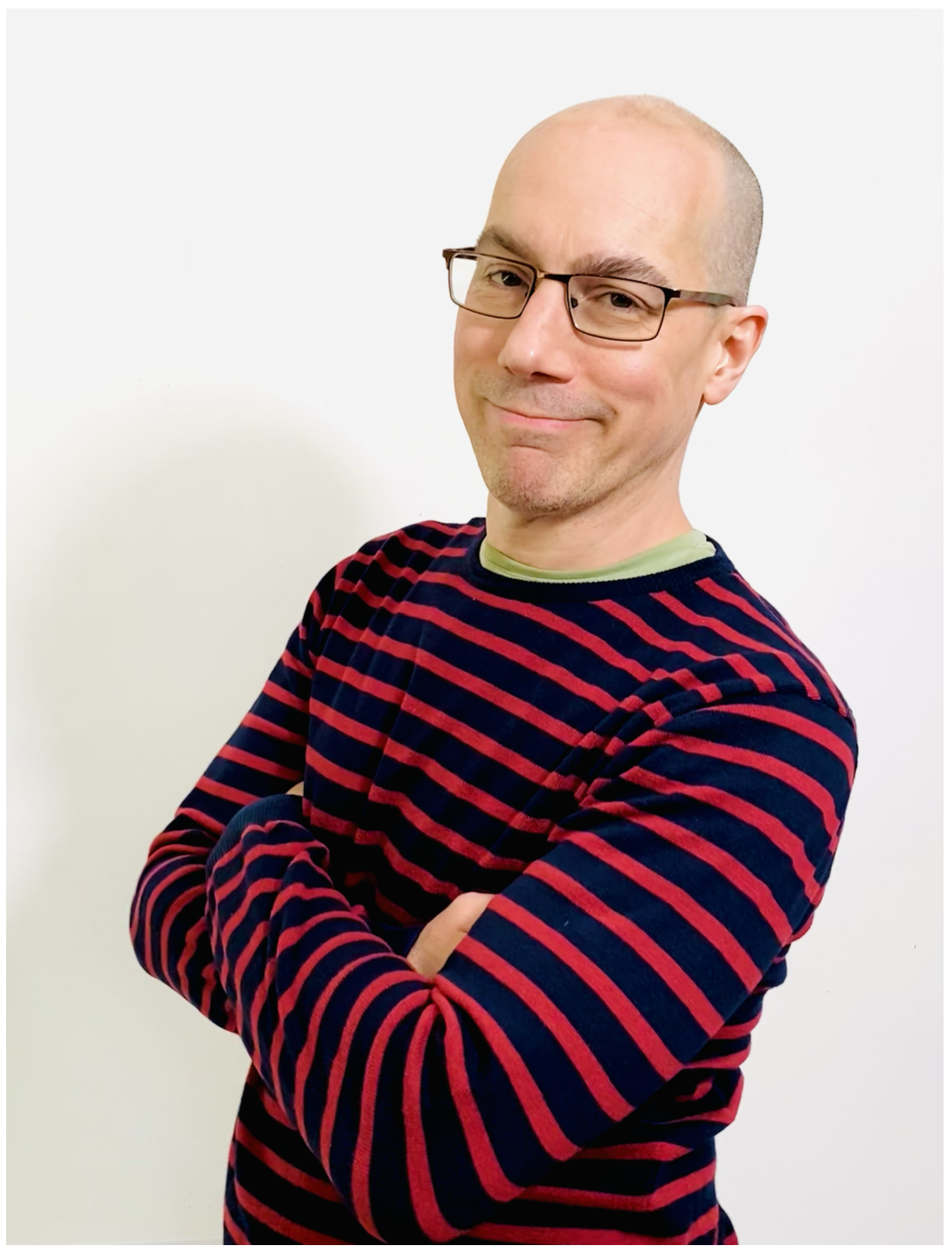
Paul Westmoreland

Paul Westmoreland is a British children's author.

His 2023 Rudy and the Skate Stars was called a "sweet, simple story about friendship and peer pressure" by The Times.

== Publications ==
- Rudy and the Wolf Cub, Book 1 Oxford University Press
- Rudy and the Monster at School, Book 2 Oxford University Press
- Rudy and the Secret Sleepskater, Book 3 Oxford University Press
- Rudy and the Skate Stars 2023, Book 4 Oxford University Press
- Rudy and the Forbidden Lake, Book 5 Oxford University Press
- Rudy and the Ghastly Gathering, Book 6 Oxford University Press
- Death on the Tracks: The Interactive Murder Puzzle Mysteries: Book 1 2024, Puffin Books
- A Killing at the Box Office: The Interactive Murder Puzzle Mysteries: Book 2 2025, Puffin Books
- Xmas Marks the Spot: The Interactive Murder Puzzle Mysteries: Book 3 2025, Puffin Books
- Murder at the Mansion: The Interactive Murder Puzzle Mysteries: Book 4 2026, Puffin Books

== Translations ==
In addition to his UK English publications, several of Westmoreland's books have been translated.

The Spanish edition of Rudy and the Wolf Cub by Paul Westmoreland is titled Rudy y el Cachorro de Lobo. Published by La Galera.

The Spanish edition of Rudy and the Monster at School by Paul Westmoreland is titled Rudy i el monstre de l'escola. Published by La Galera.

The German edition of the book Rudy and the Wolf Cub by Paul Westmoreland is titled Rudi und das Gruselrudel - Rettung für den Wolf. Published by Fischer Sauerländer. Translated into German by Christian Dreller.

The German edition of Rudy and the Monster at School by Paul Westmoreland is titled Rudi und das Gruselrudel - Ein Monster in der Schule. Published by Fischer Sauerländer. Translated into German by Christian Dreller.

The Hebrew edition of Rudy and the Wolf Cub by Paul Westmoreland is titled רודי וגור הזאבים. It is published by Sigaliyot (סיגליות) The Hebrew translation was done by Galia Aloni-Dagan.

The Greek edition of Death on the Tracks by Paul Westmoreland is titled: Φονικοί γρίφοι – Το ταξίδι του εγκλήματος (ISBN 978-618-07-1193-6). It was published in November 2025 by Patakis Publishers (Εκδόσεις Πατάκη), and translated into Greek by Giorgos K. Panagiotakis.

The Danish edition of Death on the Tracks by Paul Westmoreland was titled Mordet På Sporet. Published by Gads BørneBøger.

The three stories within Death on the Tracks by Paul Westmoreland were translated in to Dutch and published separately by Ploegsma www.ploegsma.nl Kinder & Jeugdboeken www.kinderboeken.nl The first two in the series were titled: Moord op het Spoor and Moord aan Boord.

US editions of Death on the Tracks and A Killing at the Box Office by Paul Westmoreland were published Ten Speed Young Readers under the titles of Puzzle Sleuth and Puzzle Sleuth: Undercover.
