= Michael K. Locke =

American politician (1952–2014)

Member of the Tennessee House of Representatives from the 2nd district
- In office 2002 – January 14, 2003
- Preceded by: Keith Westmoreland
- Succeeded by: Nathan Vaughn

Personal details
- Born: October 3, 1952, Kingsport, Tennessee, U.S
- Died: June 23, 2014 (aged 61), Colonial Heights, Tennessee, U.S
- Party: Republican

Michael K. Locke (October 3, 1952 – June 23, 2014) was an American politician.

From Kingsport, Tennessee, Locke was a veteran and went to Walters State Community College. He owned Hot Dog Hut in Kingsport, Tennessee. He served in the Tennessee House of Representatives briefly, in 2002, as a Republican succeeding Keith Westmoreland who died in office. Locke was killed in a hit and run accident in Colonial Heights, Tennessee.
