= Old Overholt =

Long-produced American rye whiskey

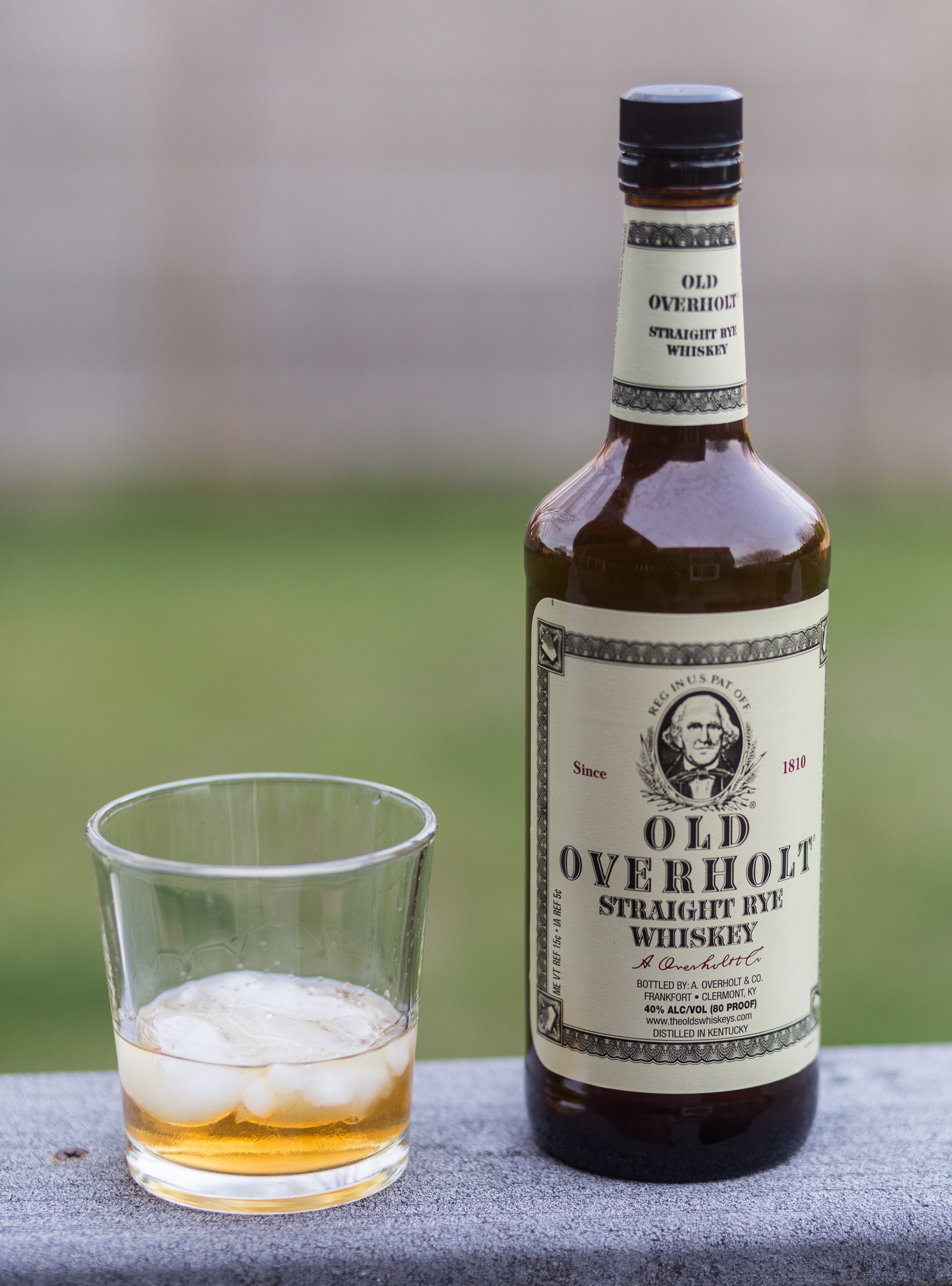
- Type: Rye whiskey
- Manufacturer: Suntory Global Spirits
- Origin: Clermont, Kentucky, United States (1987–present)
- Introduced: 1810
- Alcohol by volume: 43%
- Proof (US): 86
- Related products: Old Grand-Dad, Jim Beam
- Website: https://www.beamdistilling.com/old-overholt/

Old Overholt is America's oldest continually maintained brand of whiskey. It was founded in West Overton, Pennsylvania, in 1810. Old Overholt is a rye whiskey distilled by A. Overholt & Co., currently a subsidiary of Suntory Global Spirits, which is a subsidiary of Suntory Holdings of Osaka, Japan. It is produced at the Jim Beam distillery in Clermont, Kentucky. Old Overholt is one of the most commonly available straight rye whiskies in the United States, where it is available at most liquor stores. It is aged for four years and since early 2020 is non-chill filtered and bottled at 86 proof (43% alcohol by volume). A four-year bottled in bond, 100-proof version was released in late 2017. A. Overholt Monongahela Mash, featuring a more historic mashbill, was released in 2024. Because of its long history, Old Overholt has been called a "foundation stone of American whiskey."

== History ==
=== Early years ===
Henry Oberholzer (Anglicized to "Overholt"), a Mennonite farmer, moved to West Overton, Pennsylvania, on the banks of Jacobs Creek in Western Pennsylvania in 1800. His family came from the area of Germany, which specialized in distilling "korn", or rye whiskey, and Henry took up the tradition.

=== Growth ===
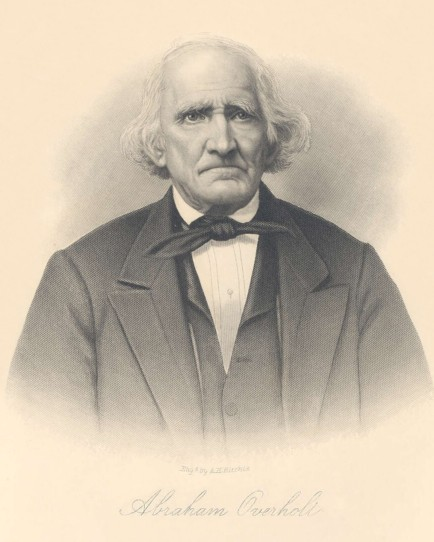
Abraham Overholt (1784–1870)

In 1810, Henry's son Abraham Overholt (1784–1870) took over management of the distillery and made it into a business. By the 1820s, the distillery at West Overton was putting out 12 to 15 gallons of rye whiskey daily. Abraham grew the company rapidly; by 1843, Baltimore newspapers were advertising Overholt's "Old Rye"; at that time, only the very few top distilleries were advertised by name. Overholt became known for producing Monongahela rye, a distinct style of whiskey from the Monongahela River valley of southwestern Pennsylvania featuring a rye and barley mashbill.

In 1853, the business expanded to include a second distillery at Broad Ford, Pennsylvania. In 1854, Abraham and his son, Henry S. Overholt, formed the A. & H.S. Overholt Company (this name changed several times and eventually became "A. Overholt & Co."). In 1859, Overholt upgraded to a new combined distillery and gristmill at West Overton that was six stories high, 100 feet long, and could produce 860 gallons per day.

In 1881, Abraham's grandson Henry Clay Frick took over the company. As one of the country's wealthiest people, the distillery was a sentimental side-business for Frick. Frick took on Andrew Mellon and one Charles W. Mauck as partners, each owning one-third of the business.

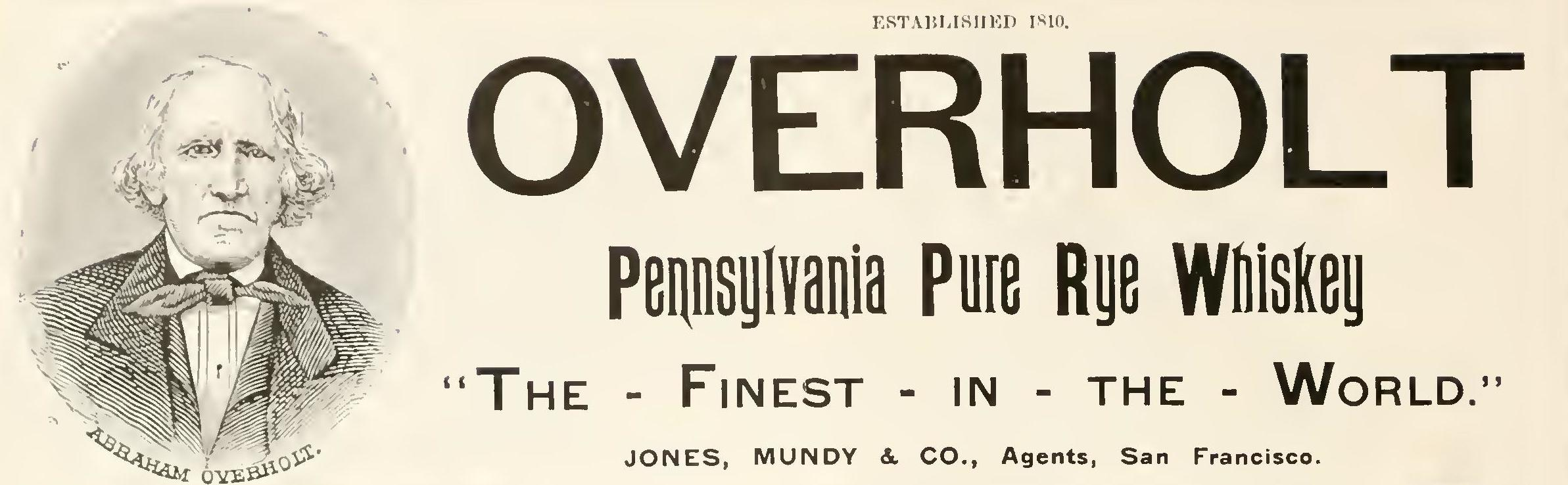
"The-Finest-in-the-World." 1897 ad - from Pacific Wine and Spirit Review

In 1888, Mauck adopted the name "Old Overholt" as the company's official name, adding a picture of Abraham as the logo. Around that time, the company started selling its product in bottles instead of barrels. By 1900, Old Overholt became a national brand. In the early 20th Century, Old Overholt became one of the country's largest and most respected whiskeys.

Frick died in December 1919 and left his share to Andrew Mellon. This ended family ownership in the company.

=== Prohibition and repeal ===
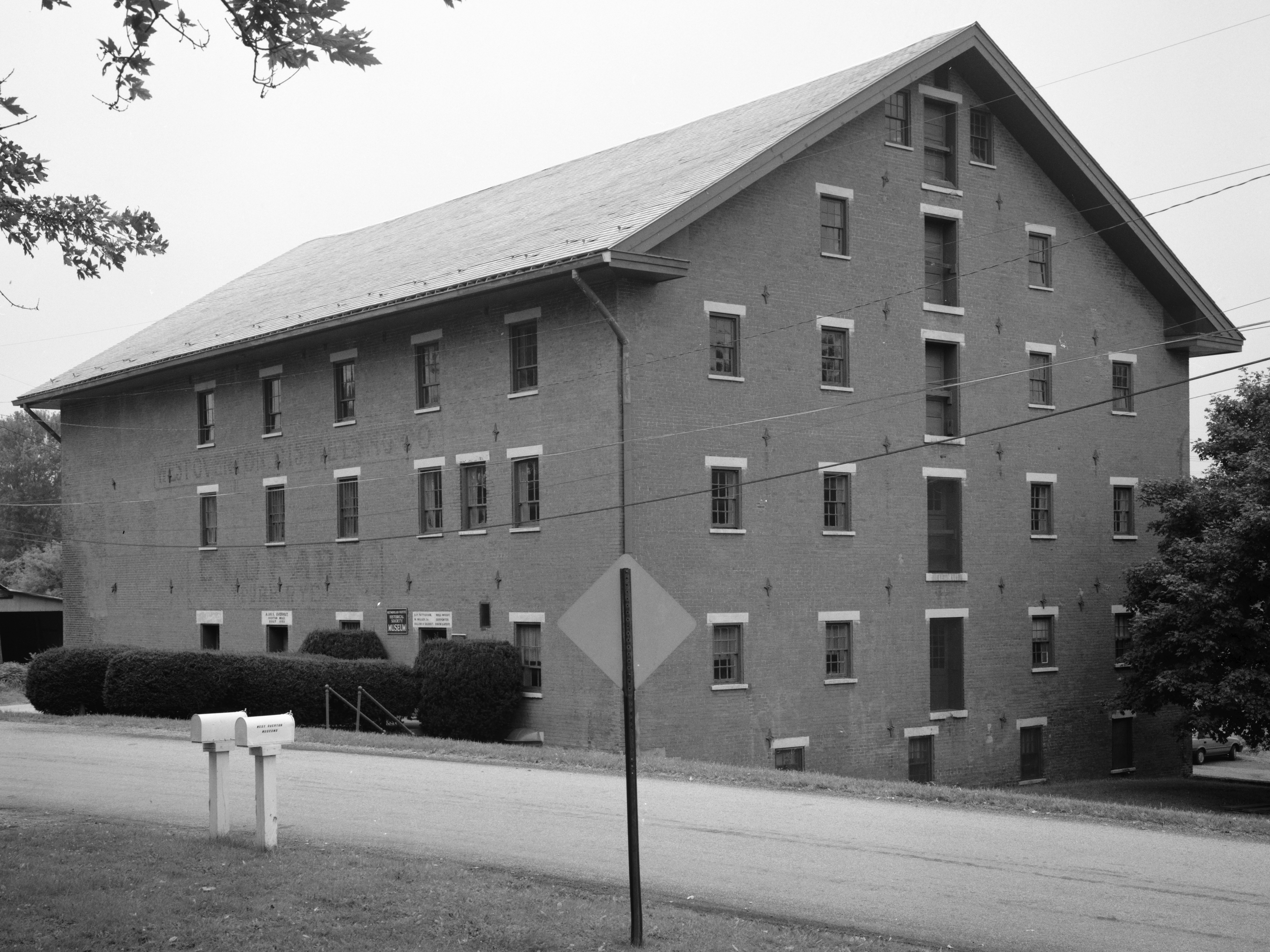
The 1859 Overholt distillery in West Overton, PA

The national prohibition of alcohol in 1920 hit most American breweries and distilleries hard, putting many out of business. Perhaps because of its association with Mellon, then secretary of the treasury under Warren G. Harding, Old Overholt secured a permit for selling medicinal whiskey. This permit allowed Overholt to sell existing whiskey stocks to druggists for medicinal use.

In 1925, under pressure from prohibitionists, Mellon sold his share of the company to a New York grocer, thus ending local ownership. The company was sold again in 1932 to National Distillers Products Co., which owned more than 200 brands.

After Prohibition was repealed in 1933, the Overholt distillery at Broad Ford resumed production. The West Overton distillery never reopened and has since become a museum.

=== War and decline ===
During World War II, the government ordered Overholt and other whiskey distilleries to make industrial alcohol. After the war's end, whiskey generally fell out of favor with the American public, as drinkers switched to vodka. Eastern style rye whiskey, with its rich and spicy flavors, especially declined as bourbon and blended whiskeys persisted.

National Distillers promoted Old Overholt as part of its flagship “America's Four Most Whiskies” portfolio, leaning into its heritage and quality. The label continued to feature the pre-Prohibition portrait of Abraham Overholt. Products included bonded whiskey and those with age statements over 5 years.

In 1951, National Distillers stopped distilling at Broad Ford, and production of Old Overholt moved to various facilities over the years. By the 1960s, Old Overholt was the only nationally distributed straight rye whiskey. In 1962, a lighter, 86-proof version was released to accommodate changing tastes. The brand struggled through the 1970s as sales continued to decline.

=== Acquisition by Beam ===
In 1987, Old Overholt was sold to the James B. Beam Distilling Company, a subsidiary of American Brands, which moved production from Pennsylvania to Kentucky. Later the Jim Beam division was acquired by Suntory.

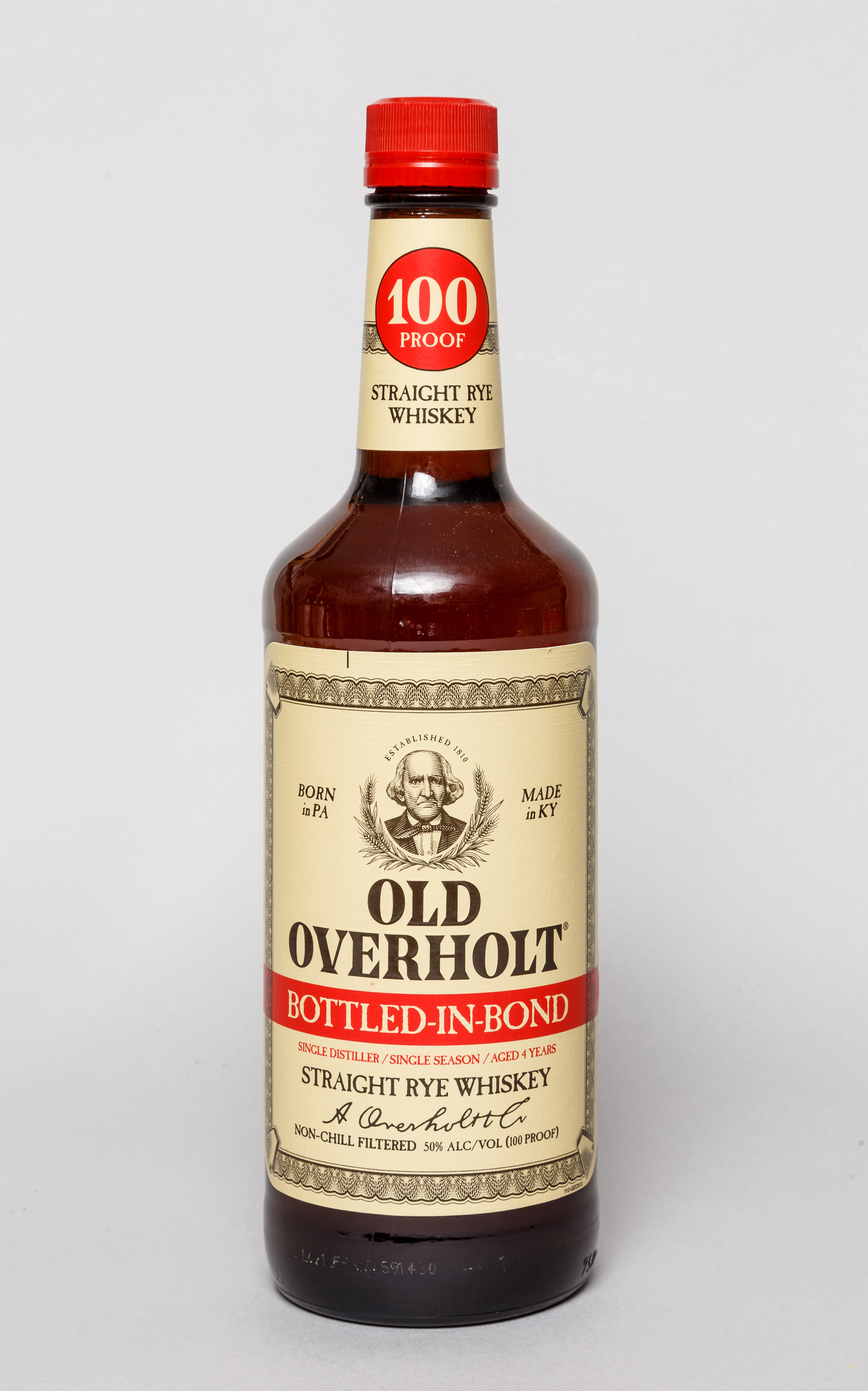
Bottled-in-Bond

Since December 2015, Old Overholt and Old Grand-Dad, both of which are Suntory Global Spirits brands, have been marketed together as "The Olds". A four-year bottled in bond, 100 proof version of Old Overholt was released in late 2017. In 2024, A. Overholt was introduced and features an historic "Monongahela mash" of 80% rye and 20% malted barley.

With its origins dating back to 1810, Old Overholt is considered the longest continually produced and maintained whiskey brand in the United States.

== In popular culture ==
Old Overholt is closely associated with the Old West, particularly Tombstone, Arizona and is served in "Old West" tourist saloons in Tombstone today.

The brand was parodied in a Warner Brothers cartoon, various issues of MAD Magazine and the Terry Pratchett novels The Dark Side of the Sun and Soul Music as "Old Overcoat". William Sanders' character Major James Lucas was an Old Overholt drinker, but Sanders failed to realize that in 1914 the distillery would have been in Pennsylvania rather than Kentucky.

The Old Overholt distillery was a plot element at the end of season 3 of Boardwalk Empire. The distillery was part of a deal between Andrew Mellon and Enoch "Nucky" Thompson, who persuaded Mellon to let him manage it to implicate Jess Smith and George Remus.

=== Famous drinkers ===
Overholt is said to have been the alcoholic beverage of choice for notables ranging from Old West gunfighters to US presidents including Ulysses S. Grant and John F. Kennedy, and Secretary of State John Foster Dulles.

== Reviews ==
Food critic Morgan Murphy said, "This very old brand of rye whiskey needles the drinker with zings of fruit flavors, grain bite, and sweet cereal notes."

Whisky writer Jim Murray said "creamy nose...citrus notes...very hard rye...momentarily moist and sweet before going on to perfect the driest, crispest finish of its genre".

== See also ==
- Henry Overholt
- Jacobs Creek (Pennsylvania)
- West Overton, Pennsylvania
