= East Huntingdon Township, Westmoreland County, Pennsylvania =

Township in Pennsylvania, US

Coordinates: 40°07′00″N 79°34′59″W

East Huntingdon Township, Pennsylvania
- Township
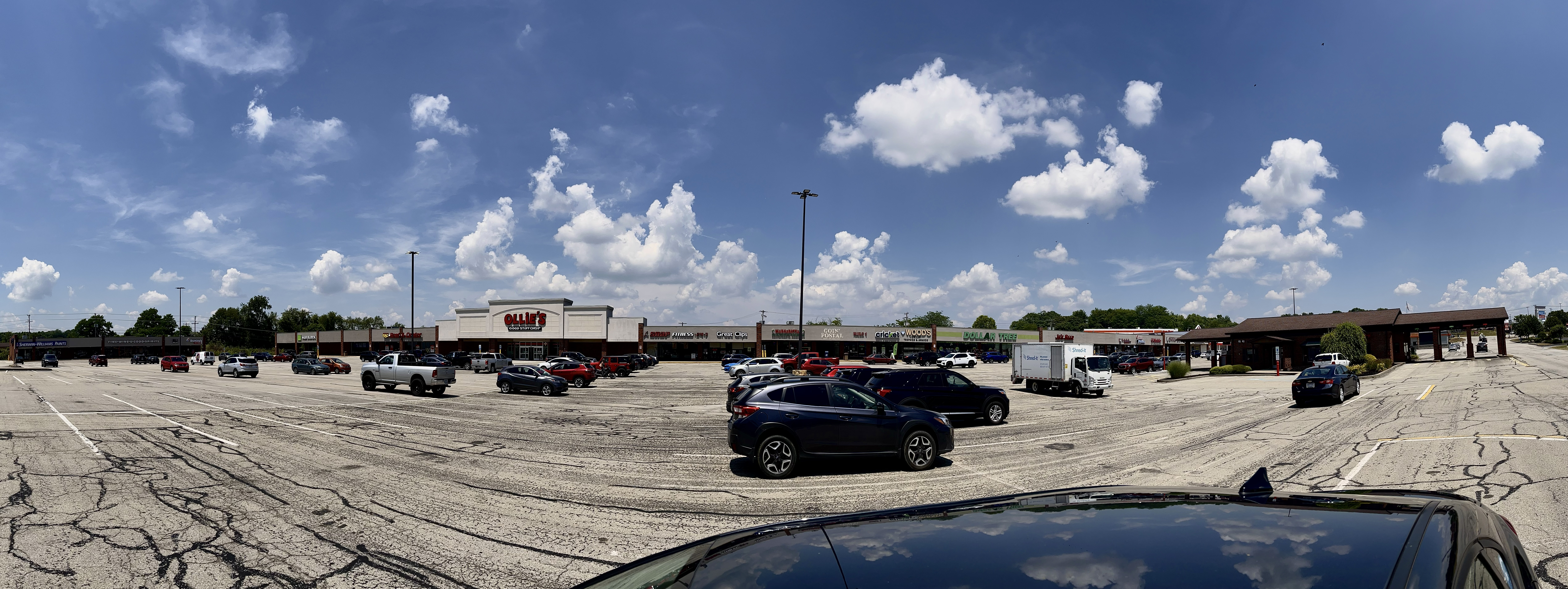
- Countryside Plaza in downtown East Huntingdon Township.
- Interactive map of East Huntingdon Township, Pennsylvania
- Country: United States
- State: Pennsylvania
- County: Westmoreland
- Settled: 1790
- Incorporated: 1798

Area
  - Total: 32.96 sq mi (85.37 km^{2})
  - Land: 32.95 sq mi (85.35 km^{2})
  - Water: 0.0077 sq mi (0.02 km^{2})

Population (2020)
  - Total: 7,712 ▼
  - Estimate (2021): 7,650
  - Density: 234/sq mi (90.4/km^{2})
- Time zone: UTC-5 (Eastern (EST))
  - Summer (DST): UTC-4 (EDT)
- FIPS code: 42-129-21304
- Website: www.easthuntingdontownship.org

East Huntingdon Township is a township in Westmoreland County, Pennsylvania, United States. The population was 7,712 at the 2020 census. From 1978 to 1988, the township had been home to the Volkswagen Westmoreland Assembly Plant, which later became a Sony plant. As of 2020 companies there include DNP, Cenveo, and Siemens.

== History ==
According to East Huntingdon official website, prior to 1798, East Huntingdon Township was a part of Huntingdon Township which encompassed areas of present-day Smithton, Ruffs Dale, Tarrs, Reagantown, rural Scottdale and Bessemer.

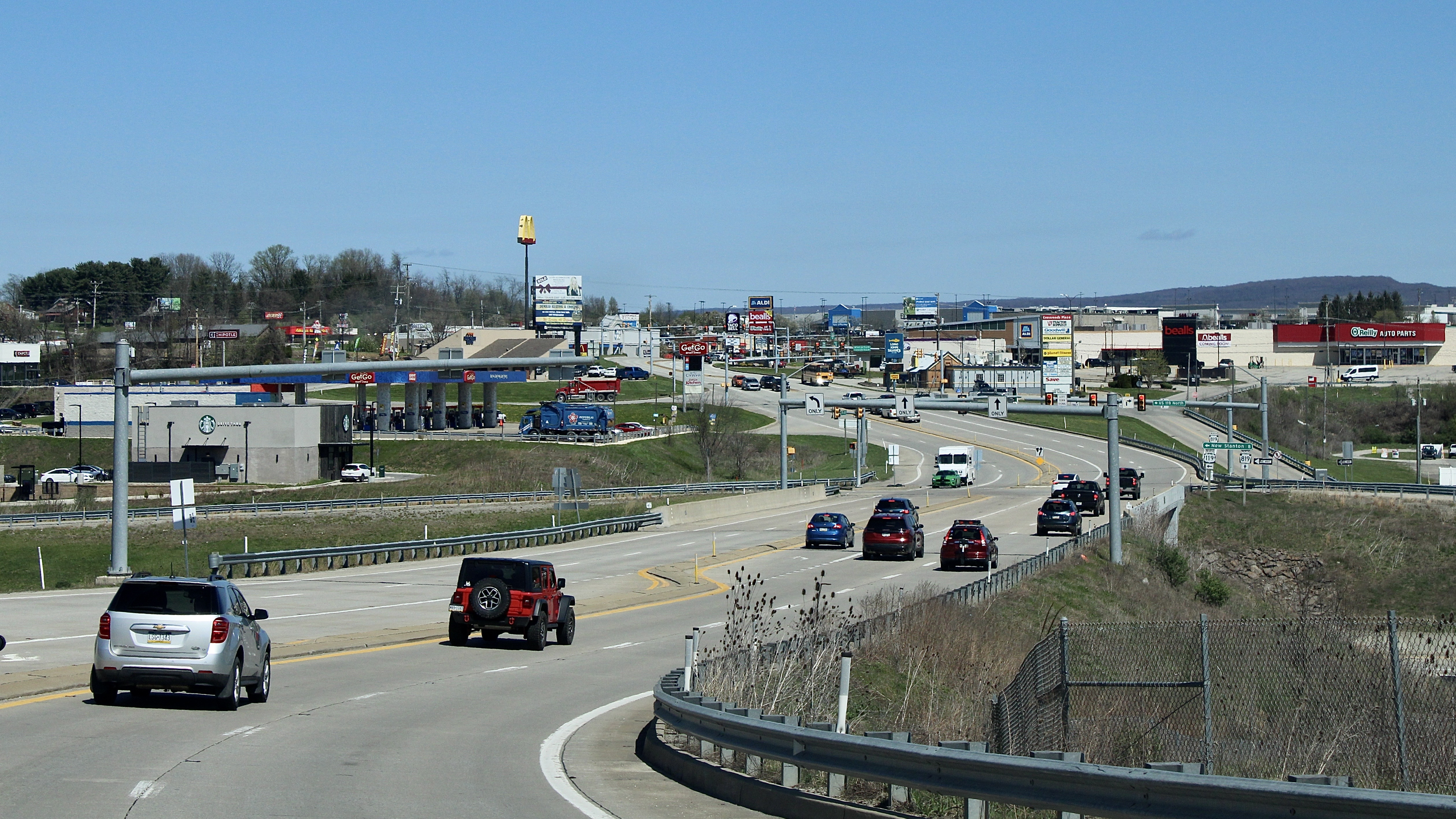
Downtown East Huntingdon in 2026

In 1798, Huntingdon was divided into South Huntingdon and East Huntingdon. East Huntingdon is bordered by Hempfield Township, Mount Pleasant, and Fayette County. One of the oldest families in the area were the Stauffer family. They are the namesake of Stauffer Run, which is a tributary that empties into Jacob's Creek.

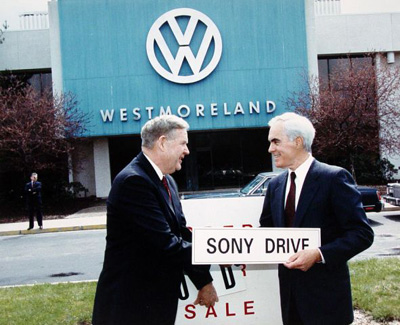
John Murtha and former governor Bob Casey Sr. at the grand opening of the Volkswagen Plant in East Huntingdon

The first school to open in East Huntingdon was a schoolhouse built on Gaut's Dairy Farm in Alverton. It was opened in 1802. East Huntingdon continued to open multiple schoolhouses throughout much of the 1800s. The first East Huntingdon school board election occurred on October 6, 1834. With the advent of the school board, the first school district in the area was formed with school taxes being introduced. The township was divided into districts, most prominently the East Huntingdon Township and Scottdale School Districts. In the fall of 1964, the two districts combined to form Southmoreland High School

The West Overton Historic District was listed on the National Register of Historic Places in 1985.

The township was the site of the Morewood Massacre of 1891, which occurred during a labor union protest.

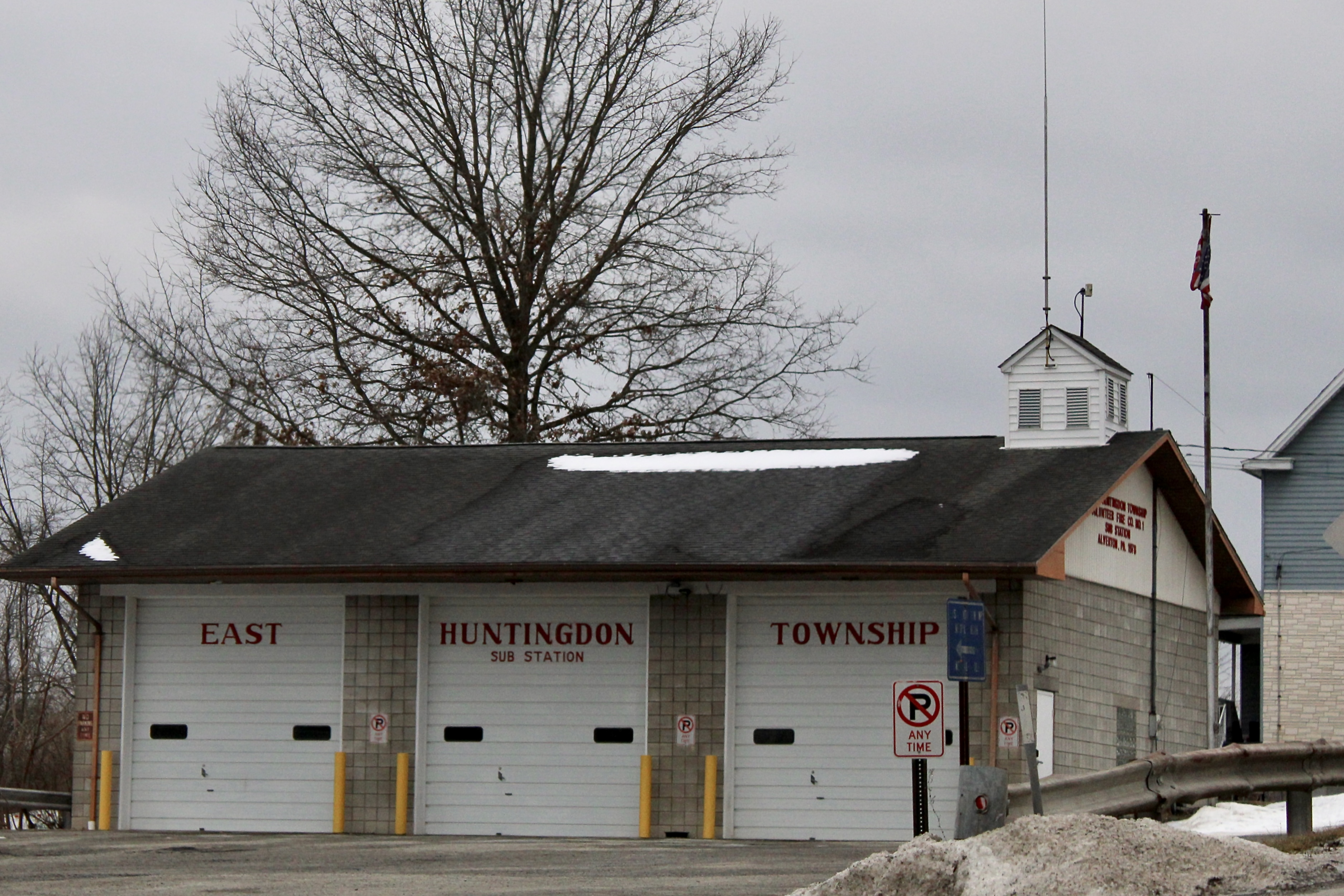
East Huntingdon Township fire company sub station in Alverton

Several farms encompassed the area of downtown East Huntingdon, known as Bessemer, until the late 1960s when businesses began to purchase the rural areas. Several businesses formed to create the Countryside Plaza. One of the original stores, JK's County Market had previously opened as a butcher shop in 1929 but expanded into a discount grocery chain with the advent of the shopping plaza. It closed in August 2019 and was replaced by a Busy Beaver hardware store. Countryside Plaza encompasses 16.9 acres of land and is home to 20 retail stores. In 2000, East Huntingdon expanded with the creation of Summit Ridge Plaza, located directly across from Countryside Plaza on Pennsylvania Route 819.

On June 19, 1947, the Ruthorn Drive-In Theater opened in East Huntingdon on Pennsylvania Route 119 near the Scottdale exit. The theater was originally a single screen, drive-in movie theater. It was renamed the Evergreen Drive-In Theater in 1949. The theater added two more screens in 2002, which remain as of June 2024.

== Geography ==
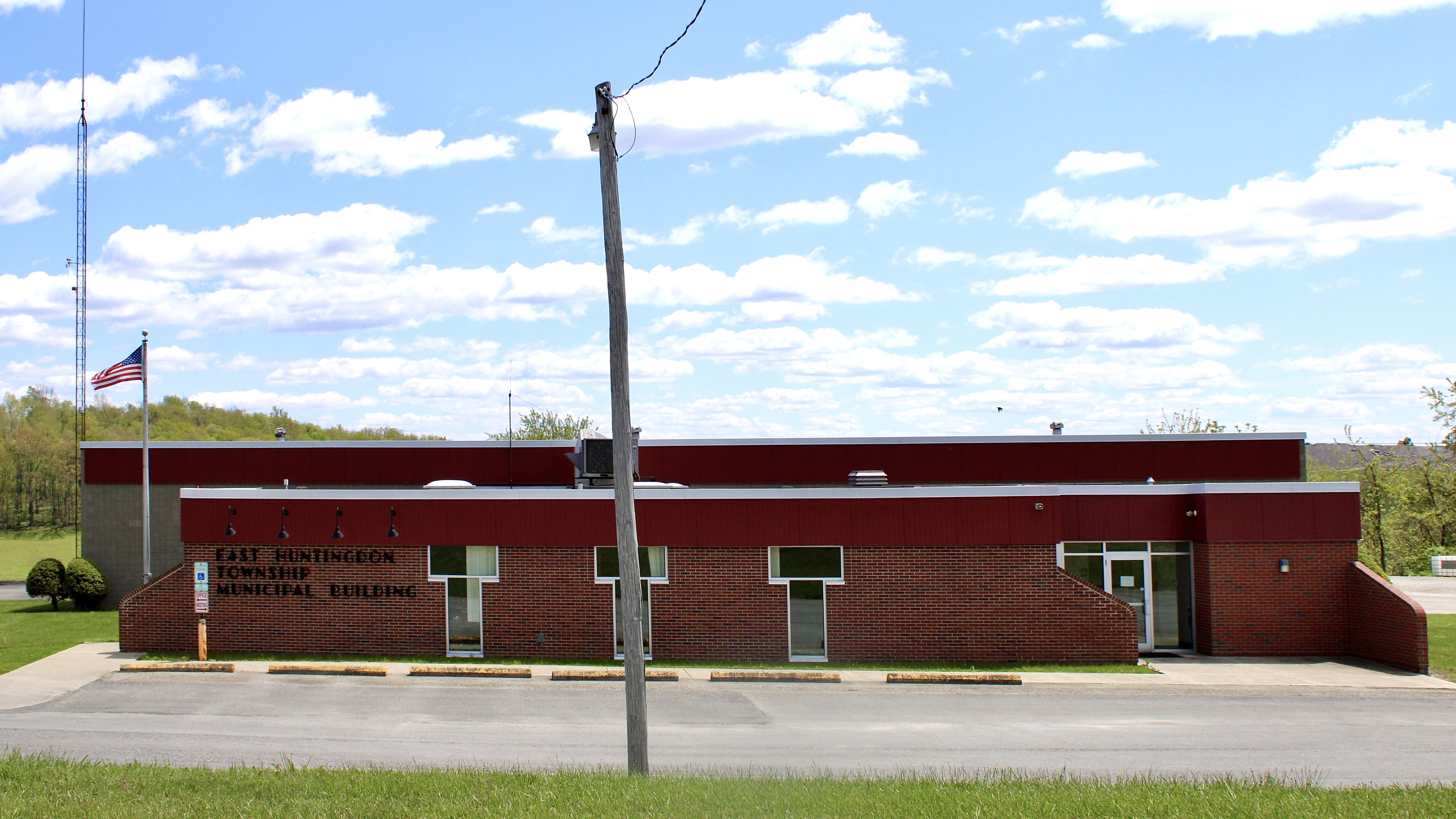
Municipal building located on Route 981

According to the United States Census Bureau, the township has a total area of 32.8 square miles (85 km^{2}), of which 32.8 square miles (85 km^{2}) is land and 0.03% is water.

The township is primarily a rural area, covered by significant areas of farmland, primarily in the Alverton, Scottdale and Ruffs Dale areas of the township. The area's businesses are heavily centralized with much of the Mount Pleasant area being encompassed by a multitude of businesses. East Huntingdon is primarily located within the Southmoreland School District, however, there are sections located within the Yough School District (Smithton, Ruffs Dale) as well as Mount Pleasant Area School District (Mount Pleasant).

It includes the communities of West Overton, Ruffs Dale, Central, Tars, Rocktown, Feree, West Bethany, Lauffer, Donnelly, Morewood, Reagantown, Alverton, Mayfield, Bessemer, Buckeye, Green Lick, Iron Bridge, Pinetree and Chaintown. To the north is New Stanton Borough; to the south is Scottdale and Fayette County.

== Demographics ==
Historical population
Census	Pop.	Note	%±
2000	7,781		—
2010	7,963		2.3%
2020	7,712		−3.2%
2021 (est.)	7,650		−0.8%
U.S. Decennial Census

At the 2000 census there were 7,781 people, 3,142 households, and 2,271 families living in the township. The population density was 237.3 inhabitants per square mile (91.6/km^{2}). There were 3,289 housing units at an average density of 100.3 per square mile (38.7/km^{2}). The racial makeup of the township was 98.68% White, 0.48% African American, 0.09% Native American, 0.22% Asian, 0.03% Pacific Islander, 0.13% from other races, and 0.39% from two or more races. Hispanic or Latino of any race were 0.30%.

Of the 3,142 households 30.0% had children under the age of 18 living with them, 57.7% were married couples living together, 10.5% had a female householder with no husband present, and 27.7% were non-families. 24.3% of households were one person and 11.4% were one person aged 65 or older. The average household size was 2.46 and the average family size was 2.92.

The age distribution was 22.5% under the age of 18, 6.9% from 18 to 24, 29.3% from 25 to 44, 24.3% from 45 to 64, and 17.0% 65 or older. The median age was 40 years. For every 100 females, there were 92.4 males. For every 100 females age 18 and over, there were 90.8 males.

The median household income was $32,460 and the median family income was $39,927. Males had a median income of $29,835 versus $22,787 for females. The per capita income for the township was $15,598. About 9.0% of families and 10.6% of the population were below the poverty line, including 15.1% of those under age 18 and 8.7% of those age 65 or over.

== See also ==
- Official website
