= Dawson =

Dawson may refer to:

== People and fictional characters ==
- Dawson (given name), including a list of people and fictional characters with the name
- Dawson (surname), including a list of people and fictional characters with the name

== Places ==
=== Antarctica ===
- Dawson Head, Palmer Land
- Dawson Nunatak, Mac. Robertson Land
- Dawson Peak, Ross Dependency

=== Australia ===
- Division of Dawson, an electoral district in the Australian House of Representatives, in Queensland
- Dawson River (New South Wales)
- Dawson River (Queensland), a river in eastern Queensland
- Dawson, South Australia, a locality and former town northeast of Peterborough

=== Canada ===
- Dawson City, Yukon
- Dawson (electoral district), Yukon Territory
- Dawson Range (Yukon), in the Yukon Ranges
- Dawson Creek, a city in northeastern British Columbia
- Dawson Range (British Columbia)
- Dawson Falls, British Columbia
- Dawson, Ontario, a township
- Dawson Township, Manitoulin District, Ontario

=== United States ===
- Dawson, Alabama, a small community
- Dawson, Georgia, a city
- Dawson, Illinois, a village
- Dawson, Iowa, a city
- Dawson Springs, Kentucky, formerly known as "Dawson City"
- Dawson, Maryland, an unincorporated community
- Dawson, Missouri, an unincorporated community
- Dawsonville, Missouri, an extinct hamlet
- Dawson, Minnesota, a city
- Dawson, Nebraska, a village
- Dawson, New Mexico, a ghost town
- Dawson, North Dakota
- Dawson, Ohio, an unincorporated community
- Dawson, Oregon, an unincorporated community
- Dawson, Pennsylvania, a borough
- Dawson Historic District, a national historic district located at Dawson, Fayette County, Pennsylvania
- Dawson, Texas, a town
- Dawson County, Georgia
  - Dawson Forest, a public-use forest in Dawson County, Georgia
- Dawson County, Montana
- Dawson County, Nebraska
- Dawson County, Texas
- Dawson, Austin, Texas, a neighborhood
- Camp Dawson (New Jersey), a small recreational area
- Dawson, West Virginia
- Camp Dawson (West Virginia), an Army National Guard facility
- Dawson Peak, a mountain in Angeles National Forest, California
- Dawson Township, McLean County, Illinois
- Dawson Township, Greene County, Iowa

=== Elsewhere ===
- Dawson Island, in the Strait of Magellan, Chile
- Te Rere o Kapuni, New Zealand, a waterfall also known as Dawson Falls
- Dawson (crater), a lunar impact crater on the far side of the Moon

== Transportation ==
- Dawson Highway, Queensland, Australia
- Dawson railway station, a closed station in Victoria, Australia
- Dawson Bridge, Edmonton, Alberta, Canada
- Old Dawson Trail, a 19th century route between Thunder Bay, Ontario and Winnipeg, Manitoba, Canada
- Dawson Street, Dublin, Ireland
- Dawson Community Airport, Dawson County, Montana, US
- USS Dawson (APA-79), a US Navy World War II attack transport

== Education ==
- Dawson College, Quebec, Canada
- Dawson Community College, Glendive, Montana
- Dawson School, an historic school building in Tulsa, Oklahoma

== Buildings ==
- Dawson Bank Museum, museum and historic building in Dawson, Minnesota
- Dawson Brothers Plant, a historic factory building
- Dawson Building, a historic building at 1851 Purchase Street in New Bedford, Massachusetts
- Dawson Farm, a historic property located at Rockville, Montgomery County, Maryland
- Dawson Tower, located on Kadugannawa in the Kadugannawa Pass

== Sport ==
- Dawson City Nuggets, a hockey team from Dawson City, Yukon Territory, Canada
- Dawson Creek Kodiaks, a Canadian Junior ice hockey team from Dawson Creek, British Columbia, Canada
- Dawson Creek Rage, an ice hockey team based out of Dawson Creek, British Columbia

== Other uses ==
- Dawson baronets, two titles in the Baronetage of the United Kingdom
- Dawson Car Company, an American car manufacturer from 1919 to 1921
- Dawson v. Delaware, a US Supreme Court decision about a person's rights of association and due process

== See also ==
- Dawson function, a mathematical function
- Dawson murder case, parents and five children were murdered in Baltimore, Maryland, in 2002
- Dawson Massacre or Expedition, an 1842 clash between Mexico and the Republic of Texas
- Dawson's (disambiguation)
