= Agnes Northrop =

American glass artist (1857–1953)

Agnes Fairchild Northrop
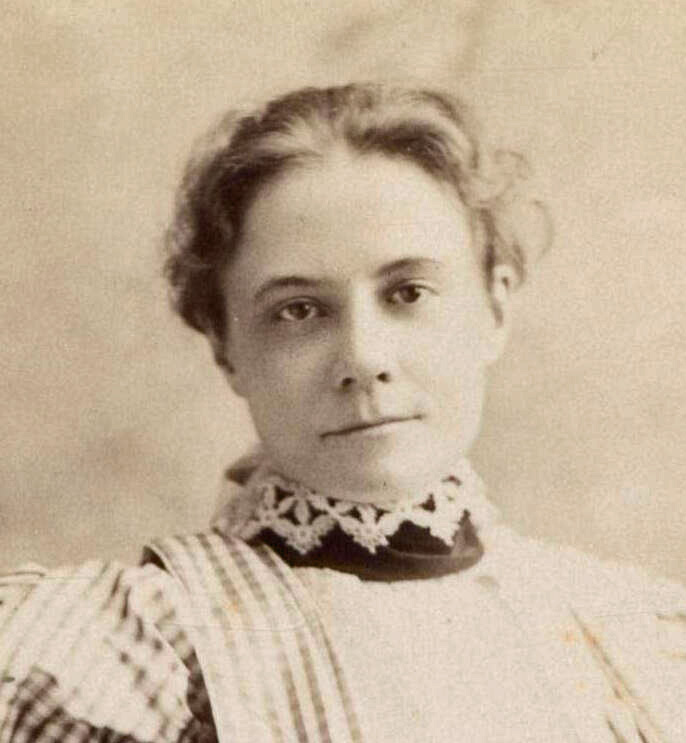
- Born: April 20, 1857; Flushing, New York
- Died: September 14, 1953 (aged 96); Gramercy Park Hotel, Manhattan, New York
- Movement: Art Nouveau

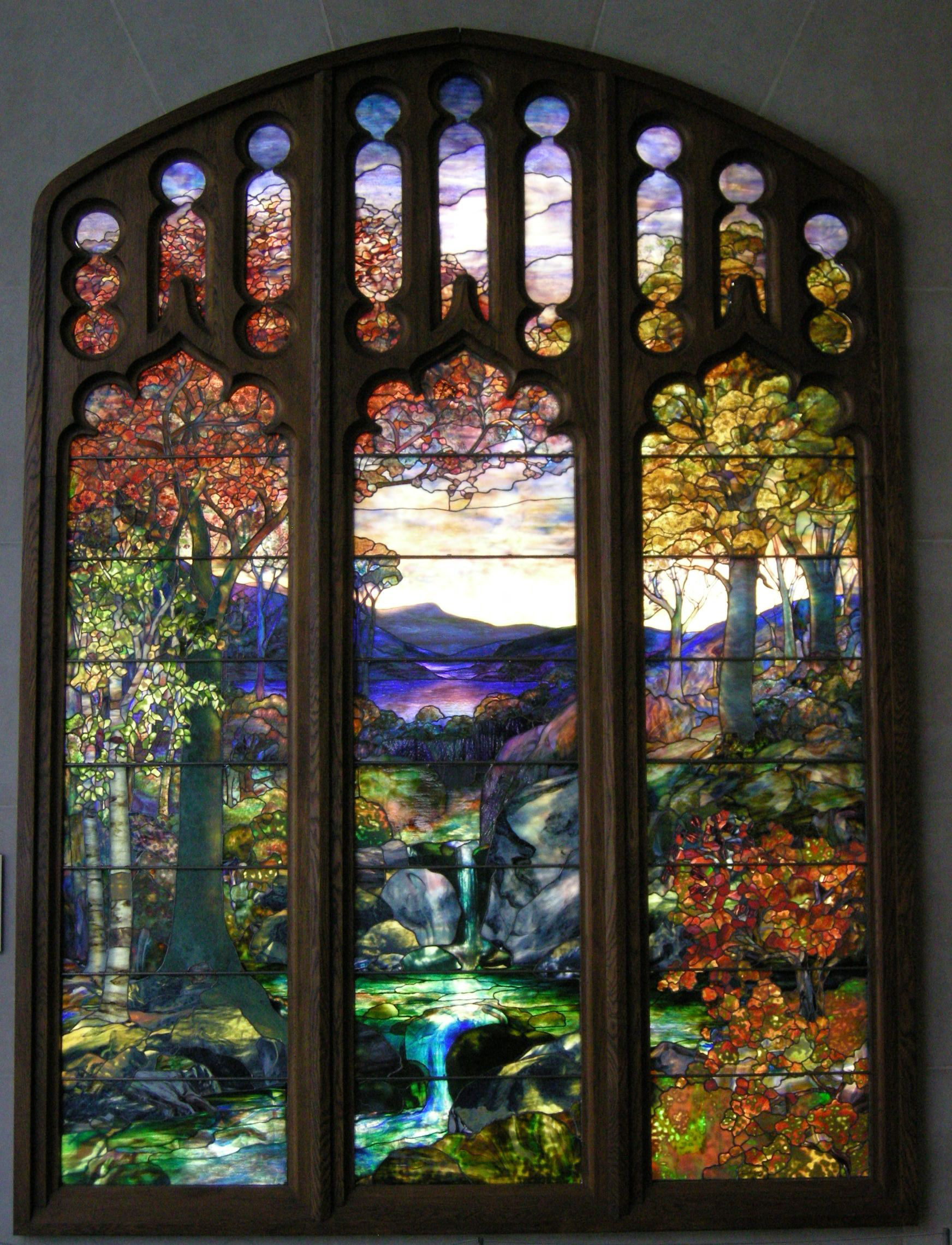
Autumn Landscape

Agnes Northrup (1857 – 1953) was an American glass artist. She is best known for her design work for Louis Comfort Tiffany and for work in iridescent glass.

== Early life and education ==
Agnes Fairchild Northrup was born in Flushing, Queens in 1857. She studied at the Flushing Institute.

== Career ==
Northrup started working for Louis Comfort Tiffany's Glass Company in the early 1880s. She worked in the Women's Glass Cutting Department until the studios closed, serving as head of the department briefly before being replaced by Clara Driscoll.

By the 1890s she was a designer for Tiffany with her own studio. It was especially her skill in drawing landscapes and gardens that Tiffany relied heavily upon. Her works would later be incorporated into the studios' window designs. Windows made of Norhrop's drawings acchieved an extraordinarily illusionistic quality. She also designed several windows for the Bowne Street Community Church (now the Protestant Reformed Dutch Church of Flushing).

Her window Magnolia was exhibited at the 1900 at the Exposition Universelle in Paris.

Northrup worked for Tiffany for close to 50 years.

Northrup died at the Gramercy Park Hotel in Manhattan in 1953. She never married.

== Work in public collections ==
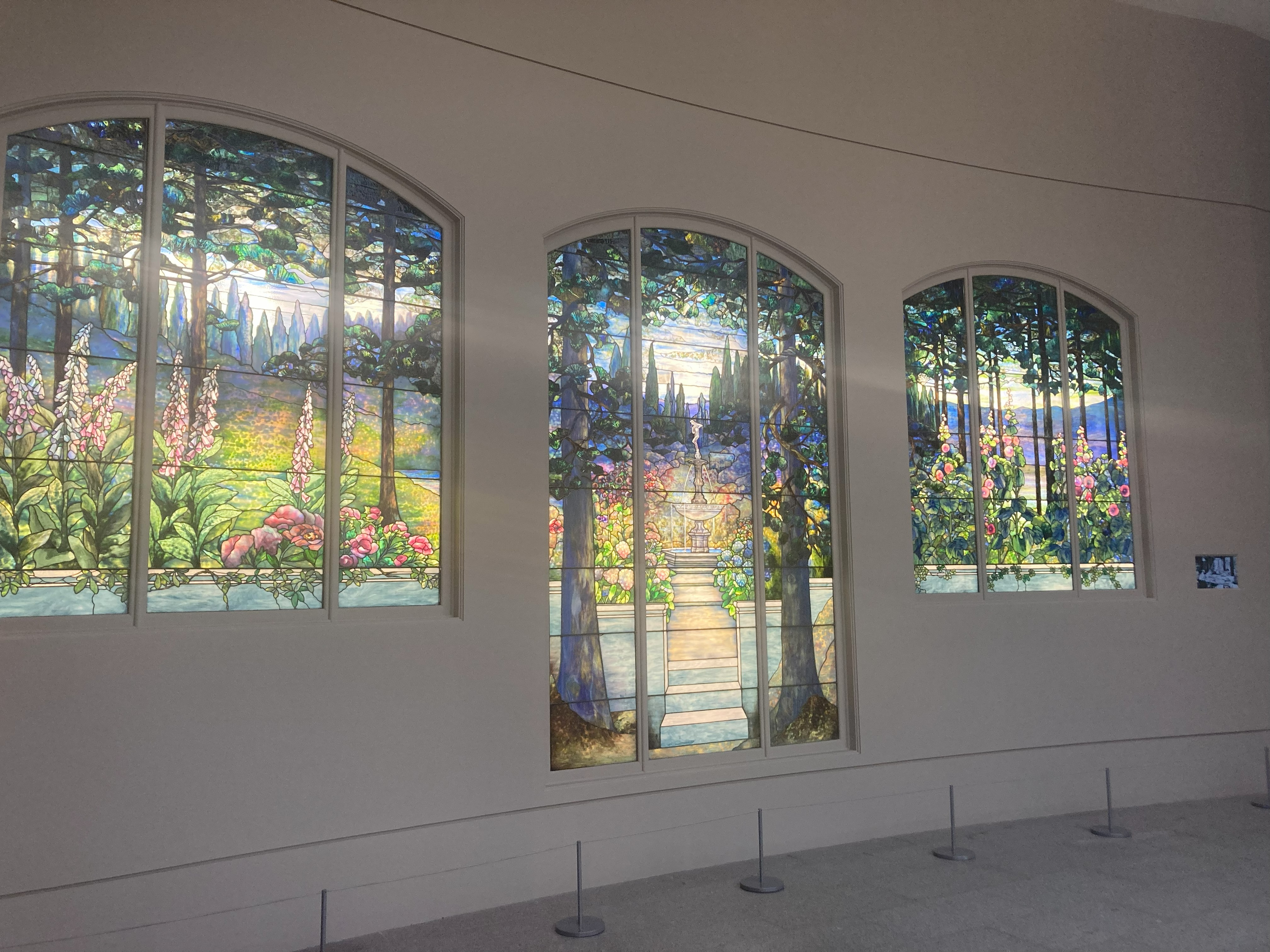
Garden Landscape stained glass triptych by Agnes Northrop in the Metropolitan Museum of Art, New York.

Her work is in the Art Institute of Chicago, the Driehaus Museum, the Charles Hosmer Morse Museum of American Art, and the Metropolitan Museum of Art.

In 2024 the Metropolitan Museum of Art unveiled a stained glass triptych by Northrup entitled Garden Landscape. The window was commissioned by businesswoman Sarah B. Cochran for her estate, Linden Hall at Saint James Park, inspired by her own garden. The window design is directly attributed to Northrop from a signed design drawing also held in the Met collection.
