= Cochran Memorial United Methodist Church =

Historic church in Pennsylvania, United States

- Philip G. Cochran Memorial United Methodist Church
- U.S. National Register of Historic Places
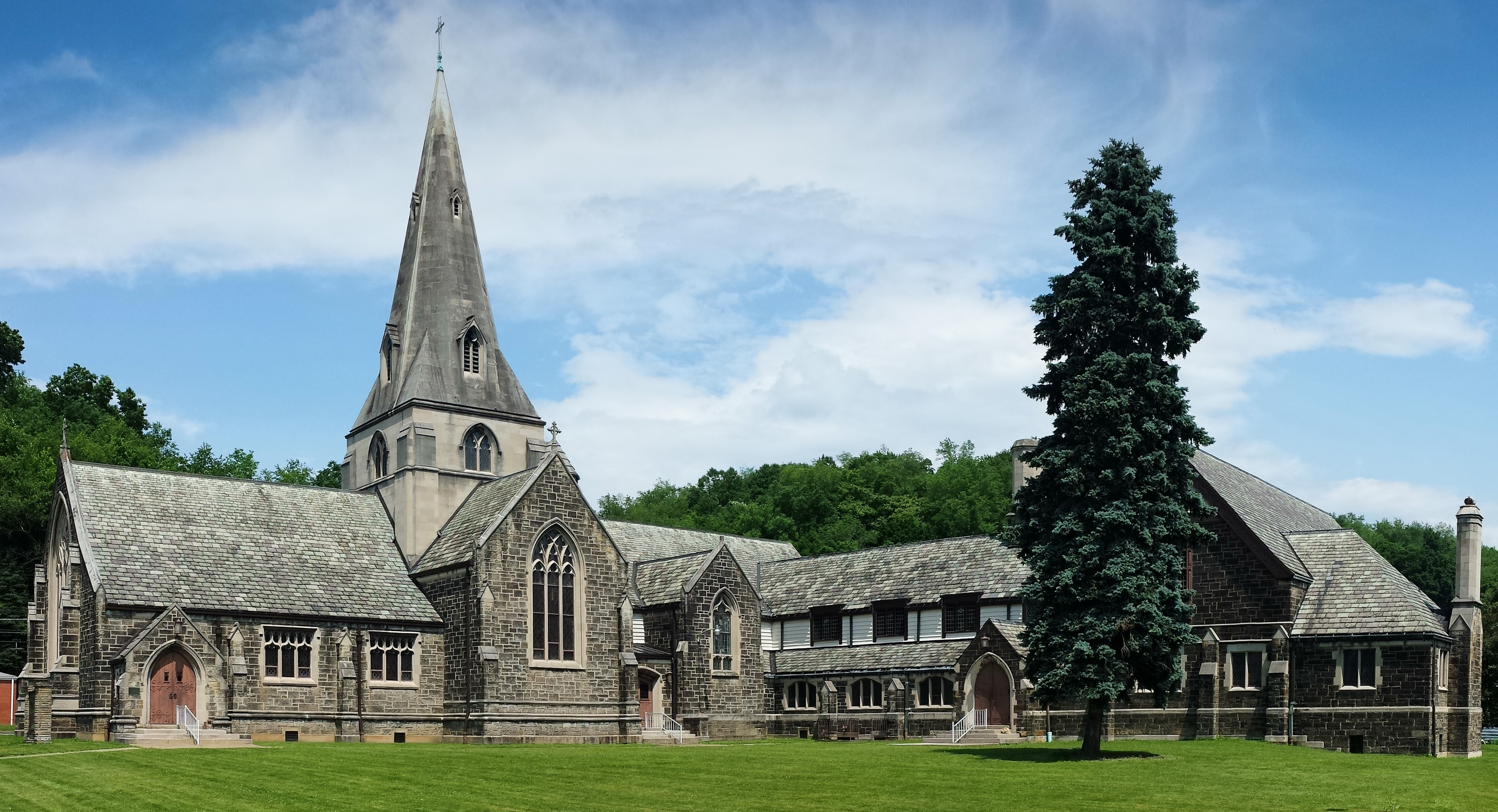
- As seen from Griscom Street, looking east.

- Location within Pennsylvania Location within the United States
- Location: Howell and Griscom Sts., Dawson, Pennsylvania
- Coordinates: 40°2′49″N 79°39′17″W
- Area: 1 acre (0.40 ha)
- Built: 1922
- Architect: Thomas Pringle
- Architectural style: Late Gothic Revival
- NRHP reference No.: 84003364
- Added to NRHP: June 4, 1984

Philip G. Cochran Memorial United Methodist Church is a historic Methodist church building located in Dawson, Fayette County, Pennsylvania, United States. It was built by Sarah B. Cochran between 1922 and 1927, and is a cruciform solid stone structure in the Late Gothic Revival style. It measures 130 feet by 161 feet. It features a crossing tower and steeple.

It was listed on the National Register of Historic Places in 1982. It is located in the Dawson Historic District.

== See also ==
- Fayette County, Pennsylvania
- Jumonville (Pennsylvania), a camp and retreat center located in Fayette County
- Linden Hall
- Sarah B. Cochran
