= Dawson's =

Dawson's may refer to:

- Dawson's Cove, a settlement on Connaigre Bay, Newfoundland, Canada
- Dawson's integral or function, a mathematical function used in computer calculation to avoid arithmetic overflow

== See also ==
- Dawson's 19th Arkansas Infantry Regiment, a Confederate military unit during the American Civil War
- Dawson's Burrowing Bee (Amegilla dawsoni), an insect species native to Western Australia
- Dawson's caribou (Rangifer tarandus dawsoni), an extinct island subspecies that lived in British Columbia, Canada
- Dawson's cat shark (Bythaelurus dawsoni), a shark species found in waters around New Zealand
- Dawson's Chess, a derivative of Hexapawn, a deterministic two-player game invented by Martin Gardner
- Dawson's Creek, an American teen television drama, originally broadcast 1998–2003
- Dawson's dawn-man or Piltdown Man, a 1912 paleoanthropological hoax
- Dawson's encephalitis, a rare form of brain inflammation
- Dawson's Field hijackings, a 1970 terrorist incident
- Dawson's fingers, lesions around the ventricle-based brain veins of patients with multiple sclerosis
- "Dawson's Geek", a song on the 2002 Busted album Busted
- Dawson's magnolia (Magnolia dawsoniana), a species of tree native to China
- Dawson's wattle (Acacia dawsonii), a species of shrub native to Australia
- Dawson's Weekly, a British series of comedy plays
- Dawson (disambiguation)
