= Sarah B. Cochran =

Sarah B. Cochran (née Moore, 1857–1936) was an active philanthropist and a director on multiple corporate boards in western Pennsylvania during the height of the area's coal wealth in the early 20th century. At one time, she was one of the wealthiest women on the East Coast. She was the first female trustee of Allegheny College and financed construction of Linden Hall and the Philip G. Cochran Memorial United Methodist Church, both on the National Register of Historic Places.

== Personal life ==
Sarah Boyd Moore was born on April 22, 1857, in Lower Tyrone Township, Fayette County, Pennsylvania to James F. Moore and Sarah B. Herbert Moore, farmers. Sarah grew up in a log house in Fayette County, Pennsylvania and became a housekeeper in the home of James Cochran, who was credited as the first to sell Connellsville coke commercially. He had recently created his own fortune in coal and coke production and was the owner of the largest number of coke ovens in America. On September 25, 1879, Sarah married James' oldest son, Philip Galley Cochran, who was being groomed to lead the family business. On September 21, 1880, Sarah gave birth to their only child, James Philip Cochran.

Sarah's father-in-law, James Cochran, died in 1894, and Sarah's husband died in 1899. Her son, James Philip Cochran, was the expected representative of the family's estate but died on March 5, 1901 while preparing for his business career as a student at the University of Pennsylvania.

As a widow, Sarah spent time traveling abroad. The length of her travels is unclear, but by 1905 she was back in the U.S. at least part of the time, as newspapers record her chaperoning or hosting parties. She was inspired to build her new home, Linden Hall at Saint James Park, by buildings she saw while in St. James's Park in London. The mansion was built between 1911 and 1913, and included a three-panel signed Tiffany window, now known as "Garden Landscape" and acquired by the Metropolitan Museum of Art in 2023. When the sixty Italian stonecutters who executed the mansion's stonework wanted to stay in the U.S., Sarah sponsored them for American citizenship.

Sarah was a semi-invalid for the last fifteen years of her life, after fracturing her hip and arm in an accident at Linden Hall. When Sarah died in 1936, a memorial service themed “The Ministry of Woman” was held at the Philip G. Cochran Memorial United Methodist Church. The service featured ministers speaking about female Biblical figures and about Sarah's life.

== Career ==
Philip G. Cochran was recognized as being one of the most extensive coal and coke operators in Pennsylvania, with large interests in Tennessee, Virginia, West Virginia. His death left Sarah to assume many of the business responsibilities and board service roles he had undertaken since his father's death in 1894. Among these were president of the Brown & Cochran Coke Company, Washington Coal & Coke Company, Juniata Coke Company, Dawson Bridge Company, and First National Bank of Dawson.

Under Sarah's leadership, the business grew threefold. At the time of her death on October 27, 1936, Sarah's obituary suggested that she was a founder and stockholder of Cochran Coal & Coke Company of Morgantown, West Virginia; and the First National Bank of Perryopolis. In 1977, the Evening Standard in Uniontown stated that she was “at one time the nation's only coal queen.”

== Public Work and Philanthropy ==
Sarah actively supported education and religious institutions. In 1905 she donated $50,000 to Allegheny College in Meadville, Pennsylvania for the construction of a men's dormitory named Cochran Hall, which was dedicated in 1908. Known as the “Lady-Elect of Allegheny,” she became the College's first female trustee, serving from 1908 until her death in 1936. She was a member of the board of directors of American University at Washington, D.C. and donated to Otterbein College, Washington & Jefferson College, and West Virginia University. In 1921, the Bethany College Bulletin recorded her contribution for the Sarah B. Cochran Chair of Philosophy at that college.

In 1900 Sarah dedicated a Methodist church in Dawson to the memory of her late husband. This church was later razed when she presented its congregation with plans for a new, Gothic-style stone church. Named the Philip G. Cochran Memorial United Methodist Church, it was officially dedicated on November 20, 1927.

In addition to supporting education and religious institutions, Sarah supported women's suffrage by hosting a suffrage tea featuring Anna Howard Shaw at Linden Hall in 1915. The tea drew 600 male and female guests with proceeds supporting the Fayette County Woman Suffrage Party.

== External links and Additional Resources ==
- Linden Hall
- Philip G. Cochran Memorial United Methodist Church
- Cochran Hall at Allegheny College
- Hess, Kimberly. A Lesser Mortal: The Unexpected Life of Sarah B. Cochran. New Orleans: Books Fluent, 2021.
- Hess, Kimberly. "Sarah Cochran". National Women's History Museum. 2017.
- Frelinghuysen, Alice Cooney. "Luminous Garden: Agnes Northrop and the Women of Tiffany Studios." Metropolitan Museum of Art Bulletin, Vol 83, No 3, Winter 2026.
