= Acushnet Heights Historic District =

Historic district in Massachusetts, United States

- U.S. National Register of Historic Places
- U.S. Historic district
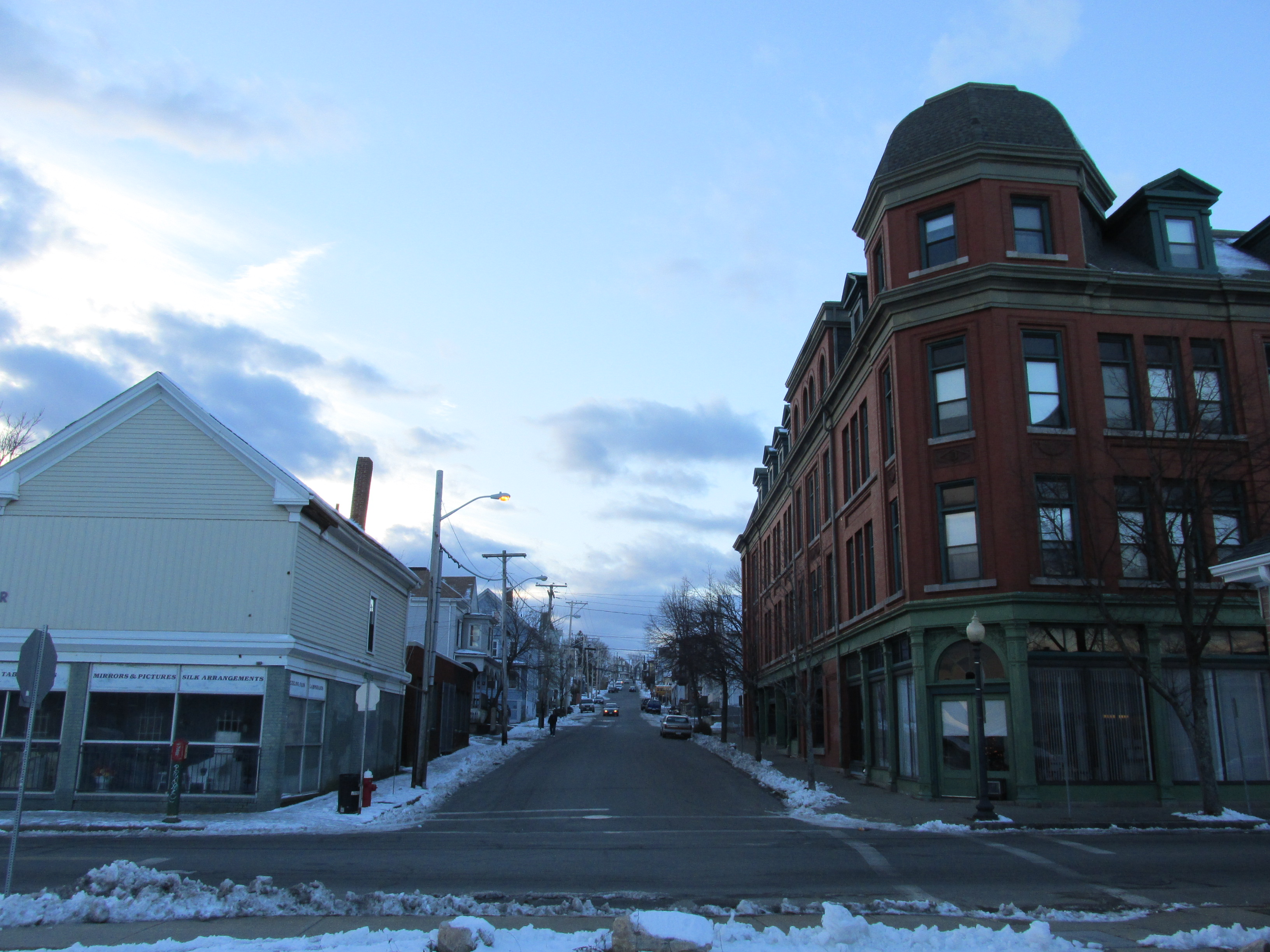
- Linden Street

- Location within Massachusetts Location within the United States
- Location: Roughly bounded by Summer, Weld, Purchase, Pope, County, and Robeson, New Bedford, Massachusetts
- Coordinates: 41°38′52″N 70°55′53″W
- Area: 20 acres (8.1 ha)
- Architect: Multiple
- Architectural style: Mid 19th Century Revival, Colonial Revival, Late Victorian
- NRHP reference No.: 89002035
- Added to NRHP: December 1, 1989

The Acushnet Heights Historic District is a predominantly residential historic district in central New Bedford, Massachusetts. It encompasses a densely-built urban area about 20 acres (8.1 ha) in size, which was developed as a working-class area, beginning in the 1860s, for the many workers in the city's factories. The district was listed on the National Register of Historic Places in 1989. It abuts the North Bedford Historic District, which is just to the south, and includes the following separately-listed properties: the Union Street Railway Carbarn, the Bradford Smith Building (since demolished), and the Dawson Building.

== Description and history ==
The historic district is in south-central New Bedford, and is bounded on the east by Purchase Street. The northern boundary is Linden Street, the western is County Street (except for a section of Robeson Street to its west), and the southern boundary is Pope Street and Clasky Common Park. The park, which is the area's major open space, was laid out in 1822 and enlarged to its present size in 1853. The district's residential architecture is entire of wood-frame construction, and is in a diversity of architectural styles popular between 1840 and the early 20th century. Brick buildings are limited to commercial buildings located on Purchase Street and the area's former firehouse. There are four 19th-century churches in the district.

New Bedford was incorporated out of Dartmouth in 1787, and had by the early 19th century become a prominent maritime port. The area north of the downtown and the port area saw increasing development pressure as the downtown expanded northward, and early development north of Clasky Common took place in this context. In the later 19th century, mill complexes were erected on the shores of the Acushnet River east of Purchase Street, bringing an influx of workers to the city. The Acushnet Heights area then saw more rapid development, as the mills built housing for their workers, and others built additional housing on speculation to meet the growing demand. By 1870, the area had acquired a distinct neighborhood identify as "Acushnet Heights". The major employer for many of the district's residents were the Wamsutta Mills.

== See also ==
- National Register of Historic Places listings in New Bedford, Massachusetts
