= Dawson (given name) =

Dawson is a masculine given name. Notable people with the name include:

== People ==
- Dawson Bates (1876–1949), Northern Irish politician
- Dawson Brunswick, American politician
- Dawson Buckley (1917–1993), Australian rugby league player
- Dawson Burns (1828–1909), English minister and temperance activist
- Dawson Charlie (c. 1865–1908), Canadian First Nation person and gold discoverer
- Dawson Cram (born 2001), American stock car racing driver
- Dawson Dawson-Walker (1868–1934), British clergyman, classicist, theologian, and academic
- Dawson Dawson-Watson (1864–1939), British painter
- Dawson Deaton (born 1999), American football player
- Dawson Devoy (born 2001) Irish association football player
- Dawson Dunbar (born 1999), Canadian actor
- Dawson Engler, American computer scientist and professor
- Dawson Fernandes (born 1990), Indian footballer
- Dawson Garcia (born 2001), American basketball player
- Dawson Gurley (born 1993), American YouTube personality
- Dawson Harron (1921–1988), English cricketer
- Dawson Hodgson (born 1978), American politician
- Dawson Knox (born 1996), American football player
- Dawson L. Kilgore (1823–1893), American politician
- Dawson Mathis (1940–2017), American politician
- Dawson McAllister (1946-2020), American speaker, radio host, and author
- Dawson McCartney (born 1998), American soccer player
- Dawson Mercer (born 2001), Canadian ice hockey player
- Dawson Milward (1865–1926), British actor and playwright
- Dawson Murschell (born 1995), Canadian darts player
- Dawson Odums, American football coach
- Dawson Ritchie (1920–1994), New Zealand cricketer
- Dawson Sheppard (1866–1953), Royal Navy officer
- Dawson Simpson (born 1989), Australian rules footballer
- Dawson Stelfox (born 1958), Northern Ireland architect
- Dawson Trotman (1906–1956), American evangelist
- Dawson Turner (1775–1858), English banker, botanist and antiquary
- Dawson Turner (radiologist) (1857–1928), British pioneer of radiology
- Dawson Turner (rugby union) (1846–1909), English rugby union player, grandson of the above Dawson Turner
- Dawson Walker (1916–1973), Scottish football manager
- Dawson Williams (1854–1928), British physician

== Fictional characters ==
- Dawson, in Thomas & Friends
- Dawson Leery, on the TV show Dawson's Creek
