= Bradford Smith Building =

- U.S. National Register of Historic Places
- U.S. Historic district – Contributing property
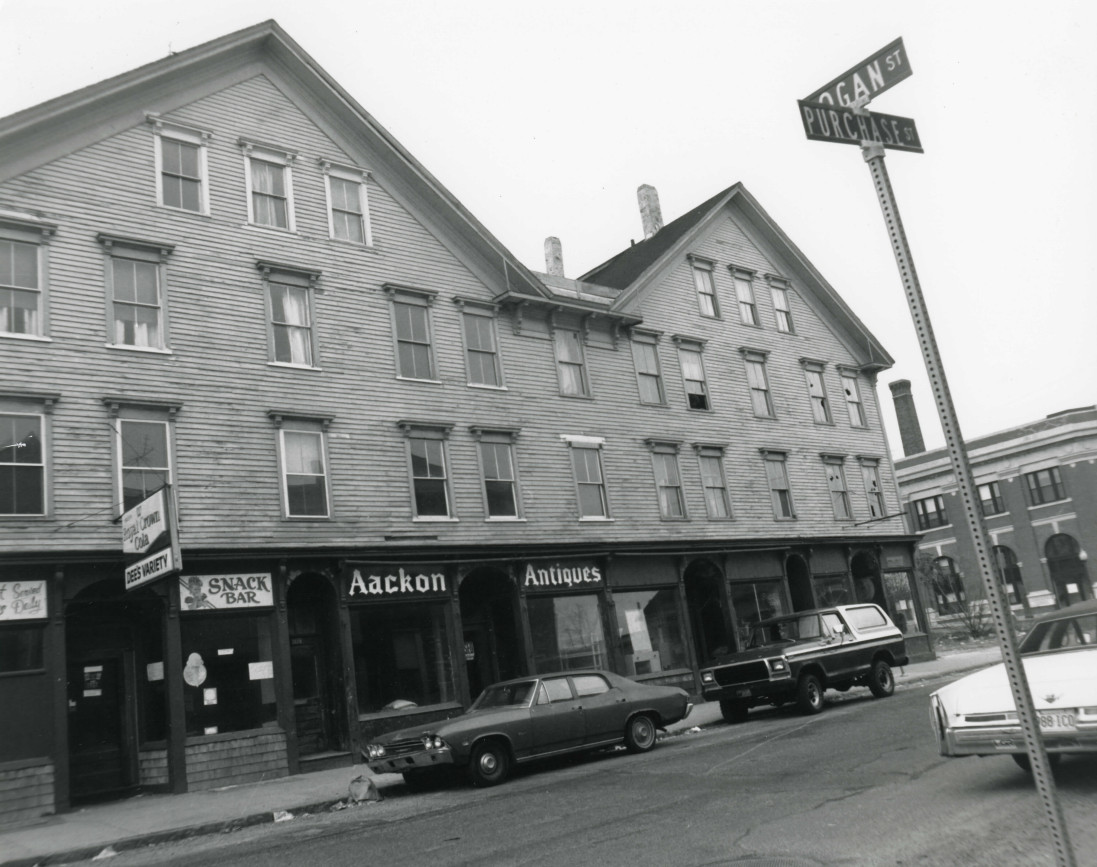
- 1981 photo

- Location within Massachusetts Location within the United States
- Location: New Bedford, Massachusetts
- Coordinates: 41°39′4″N 70°55′49″W
- Built: 1887
- Architectural style: Late Victorian
- Part of: Acushnet Heights Historic District (ID89002035)
- NRHP reference No.: 84002216

Significant dates
- Added to NRHP: May 17, 1984
- Designated CP: December 1, 1989

The Bradford Smith Building was a historic building at 1927–1941 Purchase Street in New Bedford, Massachusetts. It was a 3 1/2-story wood-frame structure, with a double-gabled roof and a stone-and-brick foundation. It was built in 1887 by Bradford Smith, a retired employee of the Taunton-New Bedford Copper Company, and housed retail space on the first floor and apartments above.

The building was listed on the National Register of Historic Places in 1984, and was included in the Acushnet Heights Historic District in 1989. It underwent a certified rehabilitation for use as senior housing in 1985. It has since been demolished.

== See also ==
- National Register of Historic Places listings in New Bedford, Massachusetts
