= Smiley Run (Youghiogheny River tributary) =

Stream in Pennsylvania, USA

Smiley Run Tributary to Youghiogheny River
- Location of Smiley Run mouth Smiley Run (Youghiogheny River tributary) (the United States)

Location
- Country: United States
- State: Pennsylvania
- County: Fayette
- Borough: Dawson

Physical characteristics
- Source: Jacobs Creek divide
  - location: about 1 mile south of Chaintown, Pennsylvania
  - coordinates: 40°05′13″N 079°39′34″W
  - elevation: 1,220 ft (370 m)
- Mouth: Youghiogheny River
  - location: Dawson, Pennsylvania
  - coordinates: 40°03′01″N 079°39′54″W
  - elevation: 843 ft (257 m)
- Length: 2.80 mi (4.51 km)
- Basin size: 2.74 square miles (7.1 km^{2})
- Discharge
  - location: Youghiogheny River
  - average: 3.73 cu ft/s (0.106 m^{3}/s) at mouth with Youghiogheny River

Basin features
- Progression: generally south
- River system: Monongahela River
- Tributaries
  - left: unnamed tributaries
  - right: unnamed tributaries
- Bridges: Gillespie Road, Davis Road, Banning Road, Rimel Road, School Road

Smiley Run is a 2.80 mi (4.51 km) long 2nd order tributary to the Youghiogheny River in Fayette County, Pennsylvania.

== Course ==
Smiley Run rises about 1 mile south of Chaintown, Pennsylvania, and then flows south to join the Youghiogheny River at Dawson.

== Watershed ==
Smiley Run drains 2.74 square miles (7.1 km^{2}) of area, receives about 42.1 in/year of precipitation, has a wetness index of 344.85, and is about 44% forested.
