= Protestant Reformed Dutch Church of Flushing =

Reformed Dutch Church of Flushing
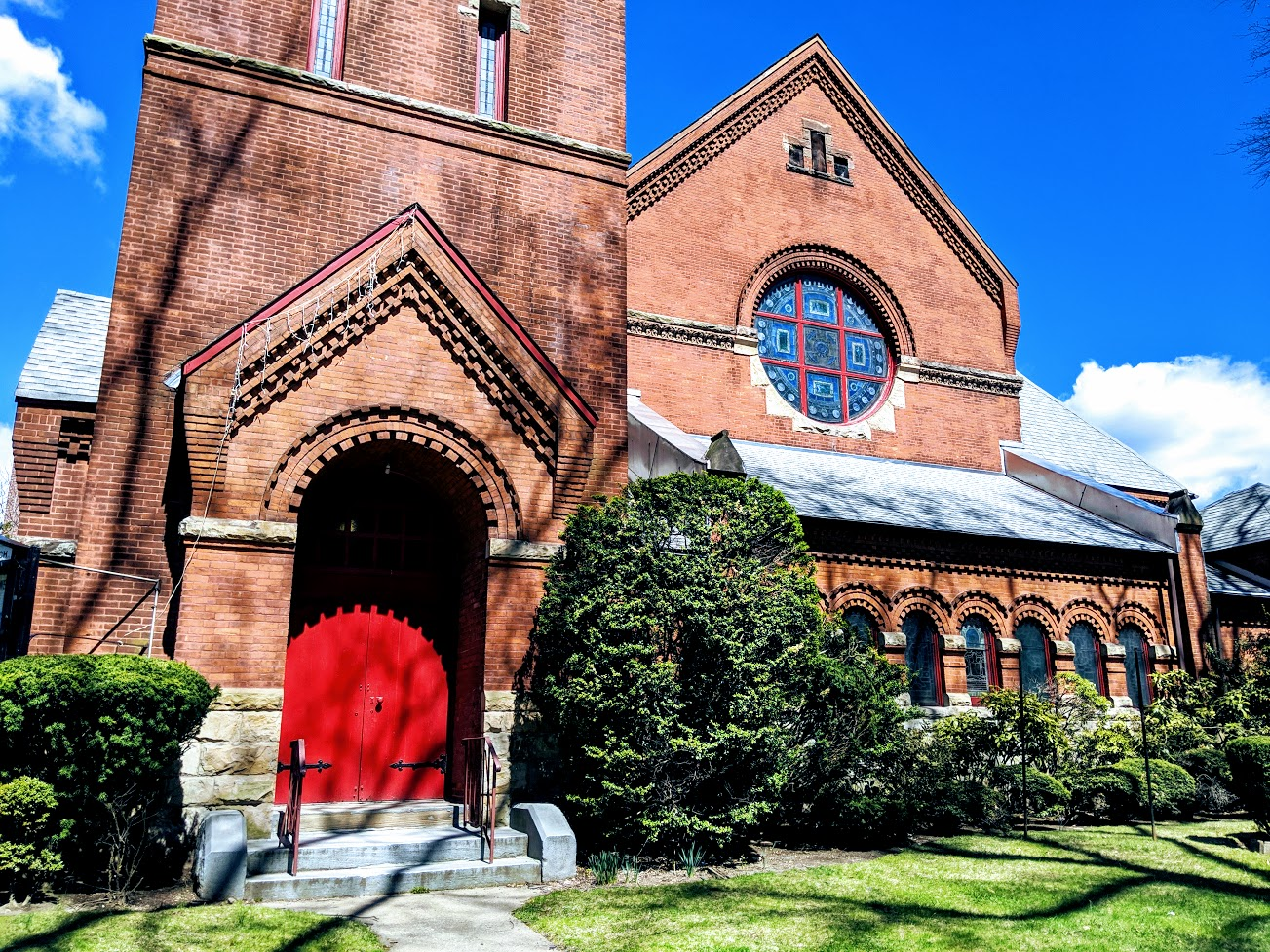
- Protestant Reformed Dutch Church of Flushing (Bowne Street Community Church)
- Interactive map of the Reformed Dutch Church of Flushing area

General information
- Architectural style: Romanesque Revival style
- Location: 143-11 Roosevelt Avenue (38-01 Bowne Street), Flushing, Queens in New York, New York
- Coordinates: 40°45′42.1″N 73°49′26.7″W
- Completed: 1892
- Governing body: Private

Design and construction
- Architect: George E. Potter

New York City Landmark
- Designated: December 13, 2016
- Reference no.: 2137

The Protestant Reformed Dutch Church of Flushing (Bowne Street Community Church) is a historic house of worship at Roosevelt Avenue and Bowne Street in central Flushing, Queens, New York City. Built in the Romanesque Revival style, it is notable for a tall corner bell tower, extensive use of decorative brickwork, and its opalescent glass windows. The denomination has roots in the founding of New Netherland, and many other Reformed congregations were established during the 19th century in the former Dutch settlements along the Hudson River.

== History ==
=== Background ===
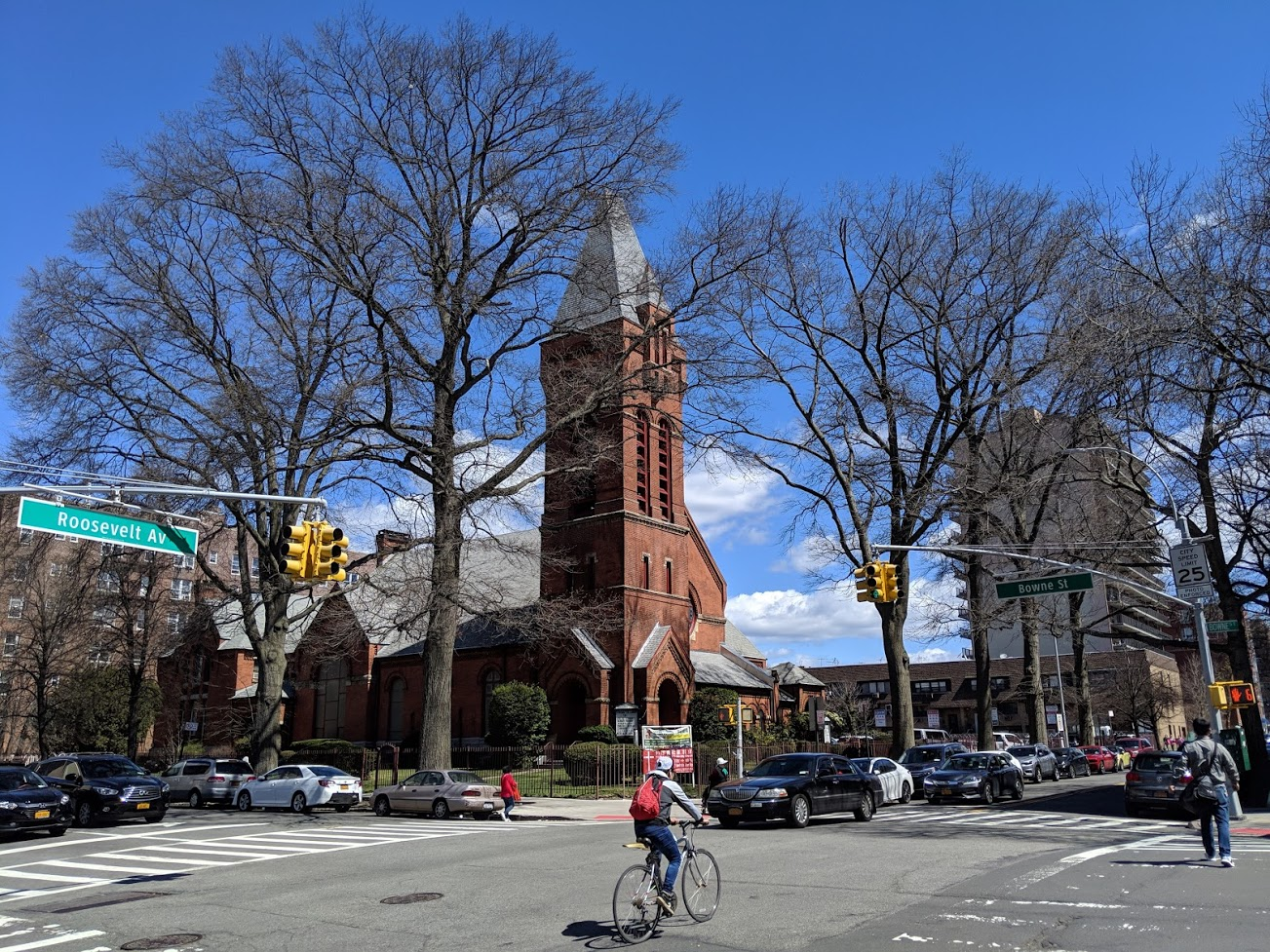
Protestant Reformed Dutch Church of Flushing (Bowne Street Community Church)

Seven churchmen, four members from other nearby Reformed Dutch Churches, and three Presbyterians organized the Flushing congregation, and on May 20, 1842, formed the Flushing Reformed Dutch Church.

Prior to the church's founding, parishioners either attended at the churches at Jamaica or Newtown, or with the Presbyterians worshipping at Saint George's. The church was formally incorporated the following year, in 1843, as the “Protestant Reformed Dutch Church of Flushing.”

The congregation erected the church at the corner of Prince and Washington (now 37th Avenue) streets. The cornerstone and foundation stones for the first church building were quarried from Blackwell's (Roosevelt) Island, and were laid in August 1843. Later, some of those same stones were salvaged to build a fireplace in the current church building.

By the 1870s, the Reformed Dutch Church had increased in membership and plans were made to move farther away from the overpopulated center of town. In 1873, a large undeveloped lot (approx. 200 sq ft (19 m^{2})) was acquired from local landowner Mary B. Parsons. Located at the northeast corner of Bowne and Amity streets (now Roosevelt Avenue), the lot was described at the time as “perhaps the best site in Flushing for a church.” In 1877, a parsonage was built on the southeastern portion of the lot, but it would be another 20 years before funds were secured for construction of the church itself.

In December 1890, Reverend James Demarest (1832–1913), a distinguished cleric within the Reformed Church of America Synod of New York, arrived to take the post as pastor and served until 1897. In 1899 the parsonage was sold and debts incurred during construction of the church were due. In 1907 a new parsonage was added to the church holdings at 37-16 Parsons Boulevard.

=== Construction ===
The church was built by Edward Richardson, who laid the cornerstone on October 10, 1891. The first recorded meetings held there were Sunday Services in May 1892. The church was formally dedicated six months later on November 6, 1892. It seated approximately 700 people and was taller and larger than the building it replaced.

== Architecture ==
It features a large corner bell tower, arched openings, detailed brick and stonework, and stained-glass produced at the glassworks of the Tiffany Glass Company of New York by designer Agnes Northrop (1857–1953), a noted congregant renowned for her skill with opalescent glass. The bell installed was cast at the Meneely Bell Foundry of Troy, New York. The Bell tower was made a NYC landmark in 2017.

The organ, an Opus 813 with 3 manuals, 34 stops, and 46 ranks, was supplied by the Skinner Organ Company of Boston in 1929. It was enlarged between 1977 and 1984, with the renovation begun by Peter Batchelder of New York City. From 1984 to 1988, the organ renovation was continued under John Wessel, who modified the console of the pipe organ. The cost in 1929 was US$22,800, equivalent to $427,500 in 2025. The previous organ (c.1892) was from Reuben Midmer & Sons of Brooklyn. The original church on Washington Street had an organ supplied by George Jardine & Son of New York City.

== Membership ==
The Reformed Church of Flushing is a congregation in the Queens classis of the New York regional synod of the Reformed Church in America (RCA). Founded in 1628, the Reformed Church of America is the oldest Protestant Christian denomination in the United States.

In 1851, some members of the original church withdrew their membership and joined others in the community to form the First Congregational Church of Flushing. That church stood across the street on Amity (Roosevelt) Avenue until 1970, when it was destroyed by fire. As the church body grew an organ was installed in 1859, structural improvements were made, and preaching shifted from Dutch to English.

The Reformed Church of Flushing formally re-joined with the First Congregational Church of Flushing, merging in 1974. The merger was a result of declining membership in both churches' congregations, as the population of Flushing changed from a predominantly white Anglo-Saxon Protestant community in the 1930s through 1950s, to one of the largest Chinese and Korean communities in the United States by the 1970s.

The First Congregational Church of Flushing, which is governed by the United Church of Christ, agreed to the merger in 1970. The name was changed to the Bowne Street Community Church. The building became associated with the Reformed Church in America, the United Church of Christ, and later in 1988 with the Taiwanese Zion Christian Church. Additionally, an independent Korean congregation, the New York Yeram Church (which is not affiliated with any particular denomination) has its main offices at the Church and also holds services there.

== See also ==
- John Bowne House
- List of the oldest Christian denominations in the United States
- List of New York City Designated Landmarks in Queens
- Old Quaker Meeting House (Queens)
- The Weeping Beech
- Chinese in New York City
- Koreatown, Long Island
- Chinatowns in Queens#Flushing
