= Dawson, Pennsylvania =

Borough in Pennsylvania, US

- Borough
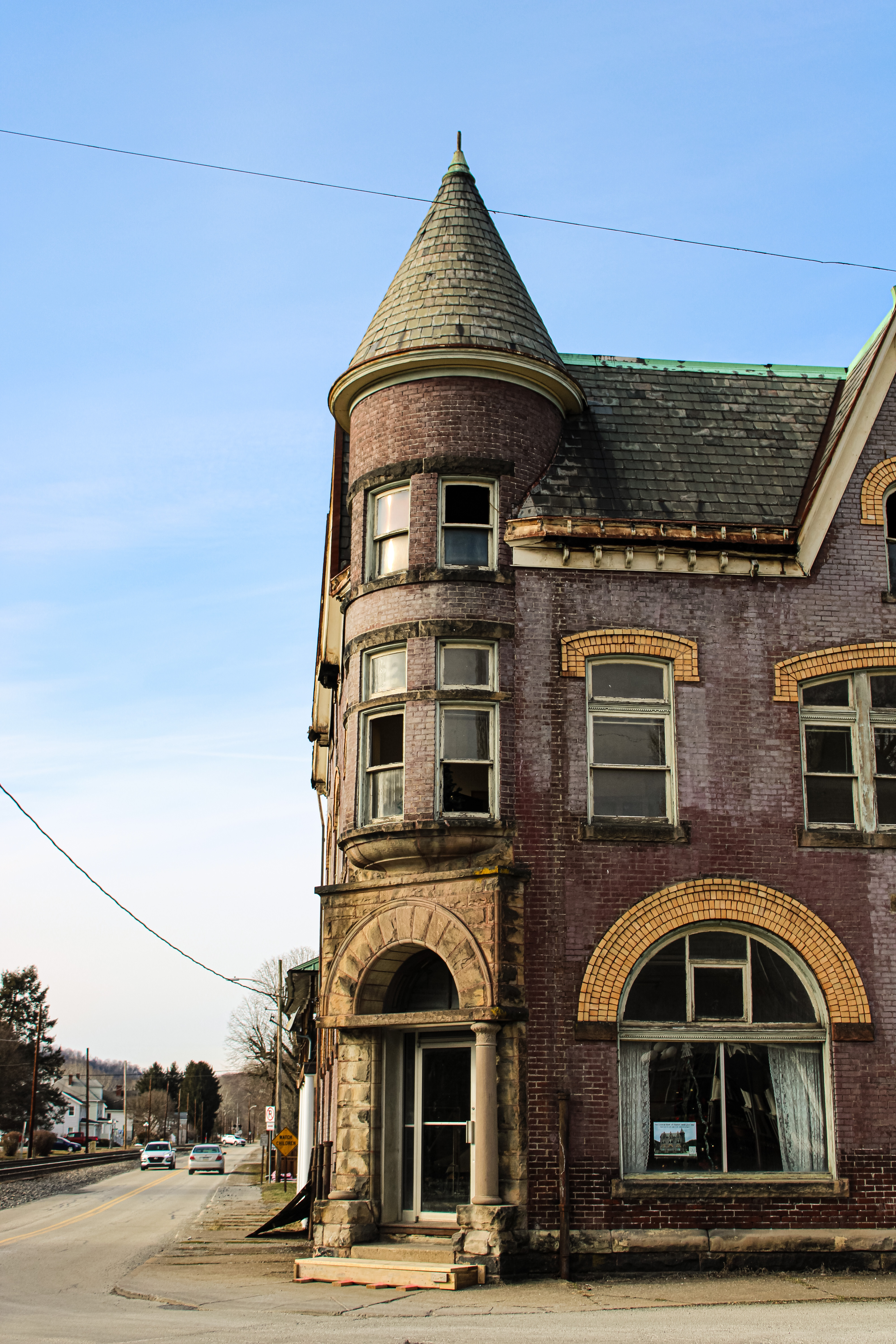
- Cochran Bank of Dawson (1897)

- Location of Dawson in Fayette County, Pennsylvania.

- Location of Dawson in Pennsylvania Dawson (the United States)
- Coordinates: 40°2′52″N 79°31′31″W
- Country: United States
- State: Pennsylvania
- County: Fayette
- Established: 1866

Government
  - Mayor: Sandy Newell

Area
  - Total: 0.21 sq mi (0.55 km^{2})
  - Land: 0.17 sq mi (0.45 km^{2})
  - Water: 0.042 sq mi (0.11 km^{2})

Population (2020)
  - Total: 352
  - Density: 2,035.0/sq mi (785.71/km^{2})
- Time zone: UTC-4 (EST)
  - Summer (DST): UTC-5 (EDT)
- Area code: 724
- FIPS code: 42-18360

Dawson is a borough in Fayette County, Pennsylvania, United States. The population was 352 at the 2020 census, a decline from the figure of 367 tabulated in 2010.

== History ==
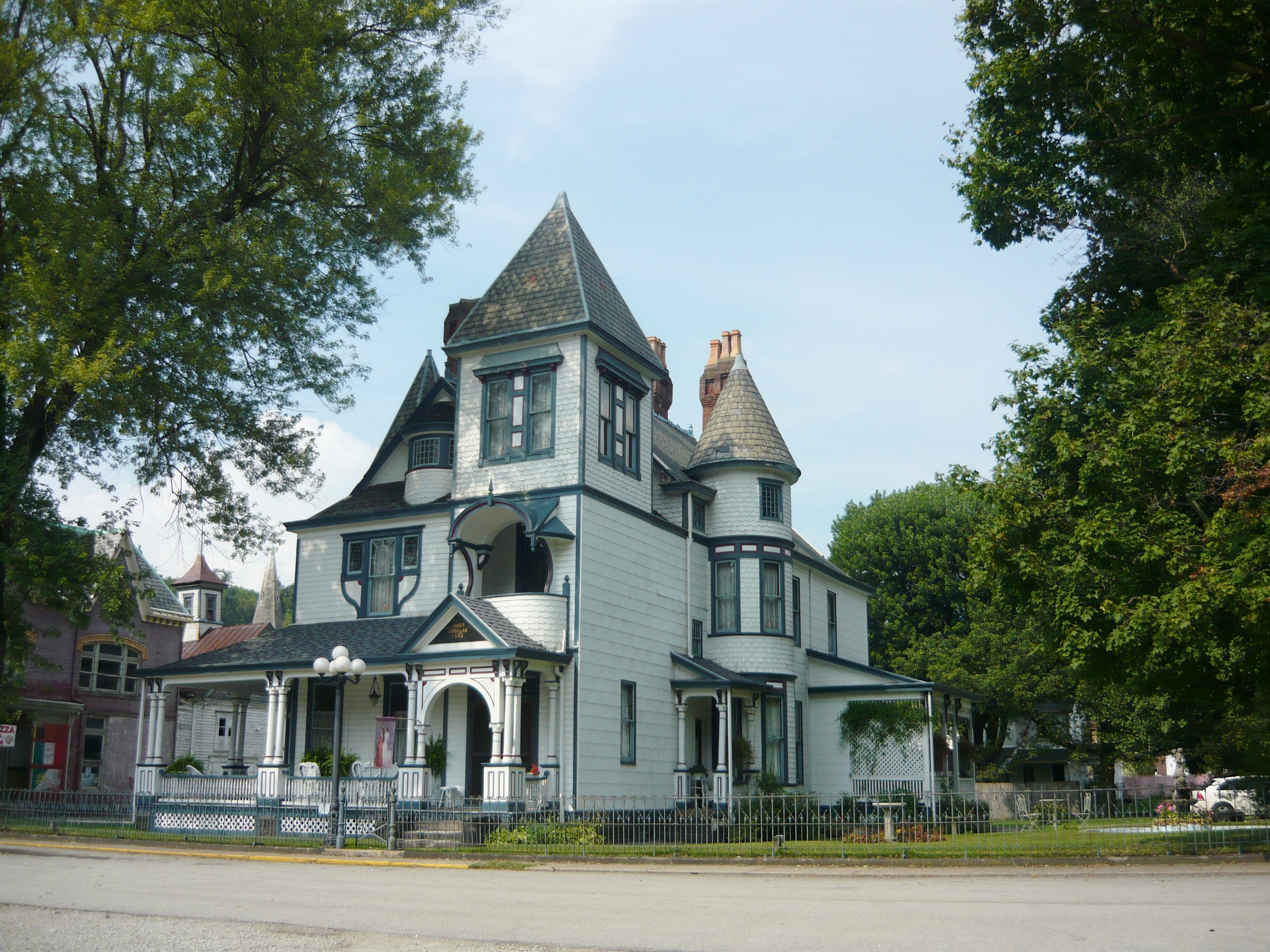
James Cochran House (c. 1890)

Phillip Cochran Memorial United Methodist Church (c. 1927)

The land where Dawson was developed had belonged to John Smilie, who held multiple public offices in the government of Pennsylvania and was a member of Congress when he died in December 1812. The property remained in a trust as a part of Smilie's estate, until his last child died in 1851, when the property was sold.

The "bottom land" where Dawson is situated was acquired by John Smilie's granddaughter, Sarah Huston Dawson, and her second husband, George Dawson.

The Smilie farm, except the river bottom, was sold to Stewart Strickler. The bottom land was sold to George Dawson, who used it for purposes of cultivation. The Pittsburgh and Connellsville Railroad was located through the tract, and upon the opening of the line Dawson's Station was established at this point. A post office was established at the same time.

The property passed, in the division of the Dawson estate, to Mrs. Alfred [Elizabeth Dawson] Howell, and in 1866 a town plat was laid out and surveyed by Martin Dickson for Mr. Howell.

Portion of the Pennsylvania Railroad which runs through downtown Dawson

Alfred Howell arranged for the tract to be duly surveyed and laid out into building lots, and so conducted his enterprise as in the course of a few years to erect a prosperous and desirable village, with churches, public schools, etc., upon what was before, and but for his business foresight and energy would have remained, merely an uninhabitable portion of an old farm.

The Philip G Cochran Memorial United Methodist Church is located at the intersection of Howell and Griscom streets, the church was designed by Pittsburgh architect Thomas Pringle and constructed between 1922 and 1927. It is a Late Gothic Revival building constructed of stone and features a cruciform plan, a central crossing tower, and a steeple. The building measures approximately 130 by 161 feet. The church was commissioned by Sarah B. Cochran as a memorial to her husband, Philip G. Cochran, a Dawson businessman associated with the region’s coal and coke industry. An earlier church had been constructed on the site following Philip Cochran’s death in 1899. As Dawson’s population and Methodist congregation grew, Cochran commissioned a larger building. The existing church was subsequently constructed during the 1920s and dedicated on November 20, 1927. The Philip G. Cochran Memorial United Methodist Church was added to the National Register of Historic Places on June 4, 1984, with reference number 84003364. It is also located within the Dawson Historic District, which was listed on the National Register in 1997.

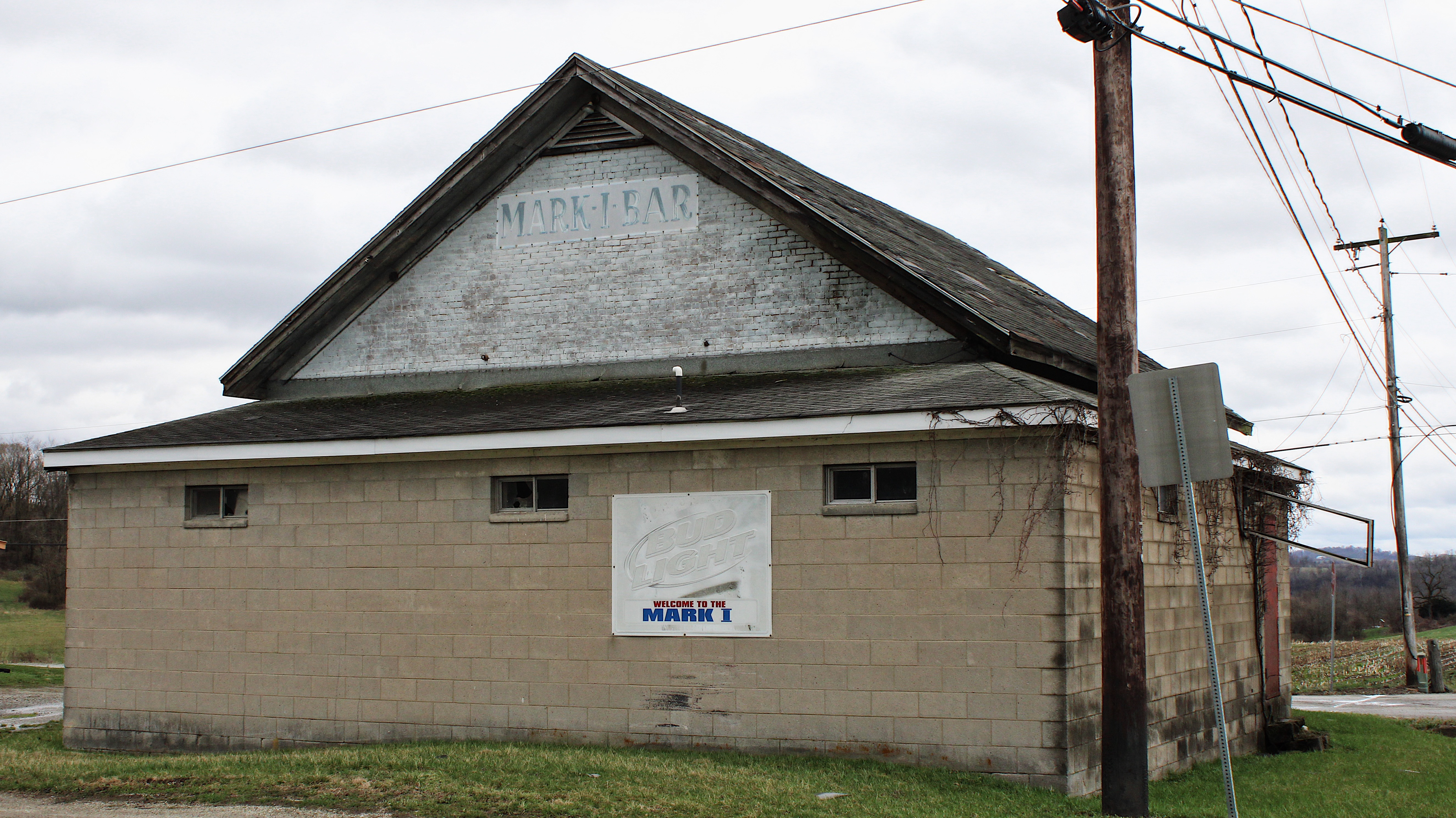
The Mark I bar on Scottdale-Dawson road as it appeared in 2026

The First National Bank building in Dawson, Pennsylvania was constructed in 1897 and originally served as the home of the First National Bank, as well as housing offices for coal and coke enterprises operating in the surrounding region. The two-and-a-half-story brick structure was built in the Victorian architectural style and is located at the intersection of Main and Railroad streets. The building stands across from a Queen Anne–style mansion built by James Cochran, an industrialist who owned the Washington and New Florence Mines, the Jimtown coke works, and the Clarissa coke works, and who served as the bank’s first president. Architecturally, the building features a corner turret above the original bank entrance, a rusticated stone foundation, stone window sills, and a steeply pitched slate roof with copper trim. One of the columns at the corner entrance was destroyed after a truck struck the building while attempting to navigate the turn. In its later years, the building was occupied by a pizza restaurant, which closed prior to 2010. The structure is currently vacant. The First National Bank was chartered during the Bank Note Era and issued National Bank Notes until 1935.

Dawson has primarily had a local economy based on the area's agriculture. One business that did exist in the borough was the Mark I Bar. It remains the only business that was opened on Scottdale-Dawson road, which has primarily been devoted to farm land since the borough's founding. After the bar's owner, Mark Nicklow, died in 2010, the building has since been abandoned.

== Geography ==
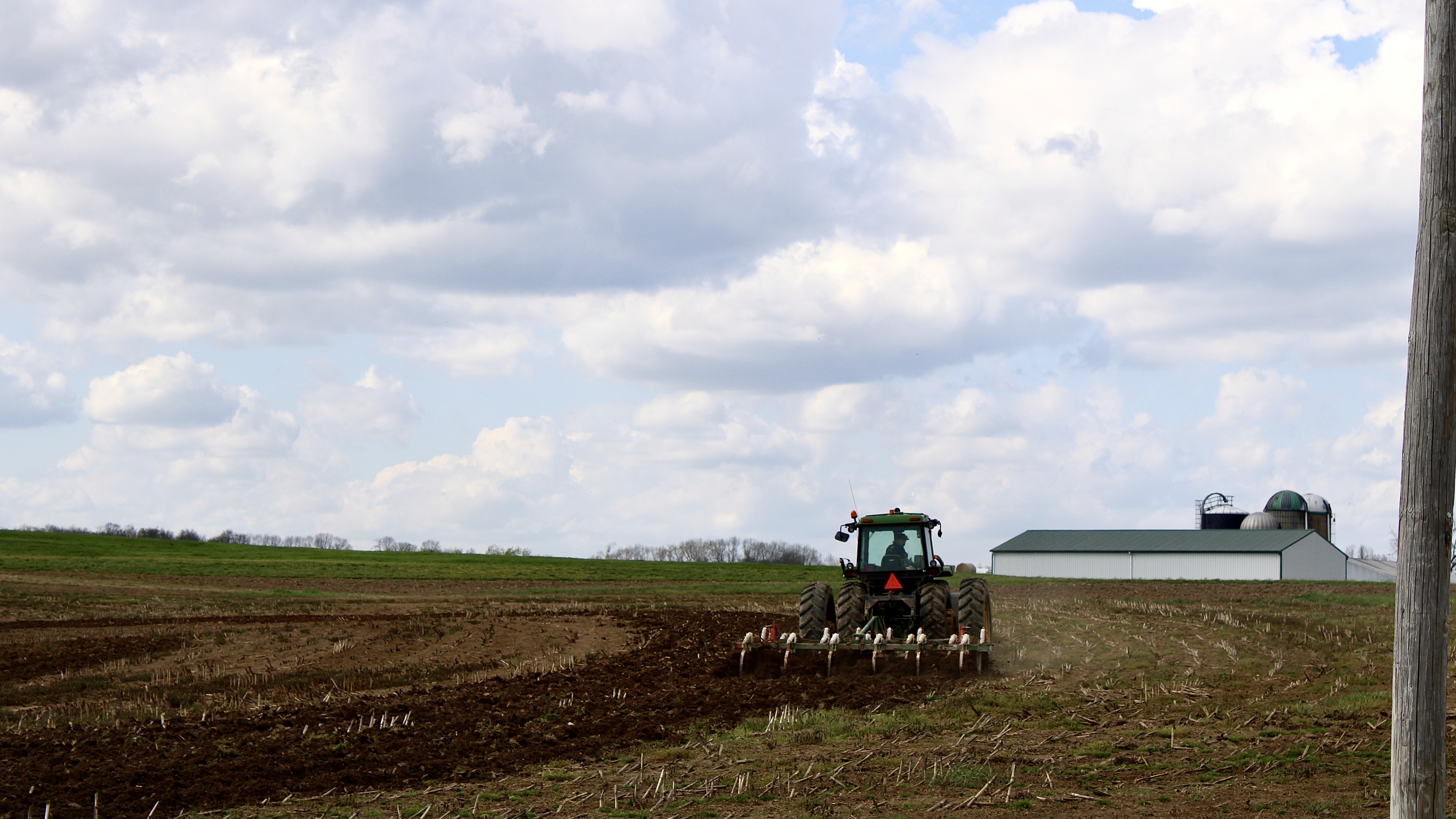
Farmer tending to his land in Dawson in April, 2026

Dawson is located in northern Fayette County at 40°2′52″N 79°39′31″W (40.047892, −79.658659), on the north bank of the Youghiogheny River. Pennsylvania Route 819 passes through the center of town, crossing the Youghiogheny into the unincorporated community of Liberty on the other side. PA 819 leads northeast 6 miles (10 km) to Scottdale and south 1 mile (1.6 km) to Vanderbilt. The city of Connellsville is 5.5 miles (8.9 km) to the southeast via PA 819 and PA 201.

According to the United States Census Bureau, Dawson has a total area of 0.21 square miles (0.54 km^{2}), of which 0.16 square miles (0.41 km^{2}) is land and 0.05 square miles (0.13 km^{2}), or 23.55%, is water.

Smiley Run joins the Youghiogheny River on the west side of the borough.

== Surrounding and adjacent neighborhoods ==
Dawson's only land border is with Lower Tyrone Township to the north, east and west. Across the Youghiogheny River to the south, Dawson runs adjacent with Dunbar Township.

== Demographics ==
Dawson Borough Building

Historical population
Census	Pop.	Note	%±
1880	453		—
1890	668		47.5%
1900	825		23.5%
1910	848		2.8%
1920	956		12.7%
1930	800		−16.3%
1940	732		−8.5%
1950	723		−1.2%
1960	707		−2.2%
1970	676		−4.4%
1980	661		−2.2%
1990	535		−19.1%
2000	451		−15.7%
2010	367		−18.6%
2020	352		−4.1%
2021 (est.)	347	▼	−1.4%

As of the 2000 census, there were 451 people, 183 households, and 120 families residing in the borough. The population density was 2,692.6 inhabitants per square mile (1,039.6/km^{2}). There were 205 housing units at an average density of 1,223.9 per square mile (472.6/km^{2}). The racial makeup of the borough is 99.78% White, 0.22% African American, 0.00% Native American, 0.00% Asian, 0.00% Pacific Islander, 0.00% from other races, and 0.00% from two or more races. 0.00% of the population are Hispanic or Latino of any race.

There were 183 households, out of which 27.9% had children under the age of 18 living with them, 53.6% were married couples living together, 8.7% had a female householder with no husband present, and 34.4% were non-families. 30.6% of all households were made up of individuals, and 16.4% had someone living alone who was 65 years of age or older. The average household size was 2.46 and the average family size was 3.13.

In the borough the population was spread out, with 24.4% under the age of 18, 8.4% from 18 to 24, 27.9% from 25 to 44, 24.8% from 45 to 64, and 14.4% who were 65 years of age or older. The median age was 38 years. For every 100 females, there were 86.4 males. For every 100 females age 18 and over, there were 83.3 males.

The median income for a household in the borough was $27,500, and the median income for a family was $30,938. Males had a median income of $27,292 versus $25,000 for females. The per capita income for the borough was $12,753. About 14.2% of families and 16.4% of the population were below the poverty line, including 23.7% of those under age 18 and 11.0% of those age 65 or over.

== Landmarks ==
The Dawson Historic District and Philip G. Cochran Memorial United Methodist Church, a gothic-style structure, are listed on the National Register of Historic Places.

== Education ==
Dawson Borough is served by the Connellsville Area School District. Parts of Dawson toward Scottdale, Pennsylvania and Upper Tyrone Township, Pennsylvania, belong to the Southmoreland School District

== Municipal services ==
The borough has sewage treatment services provided by the Yough Sanitary Authority.
