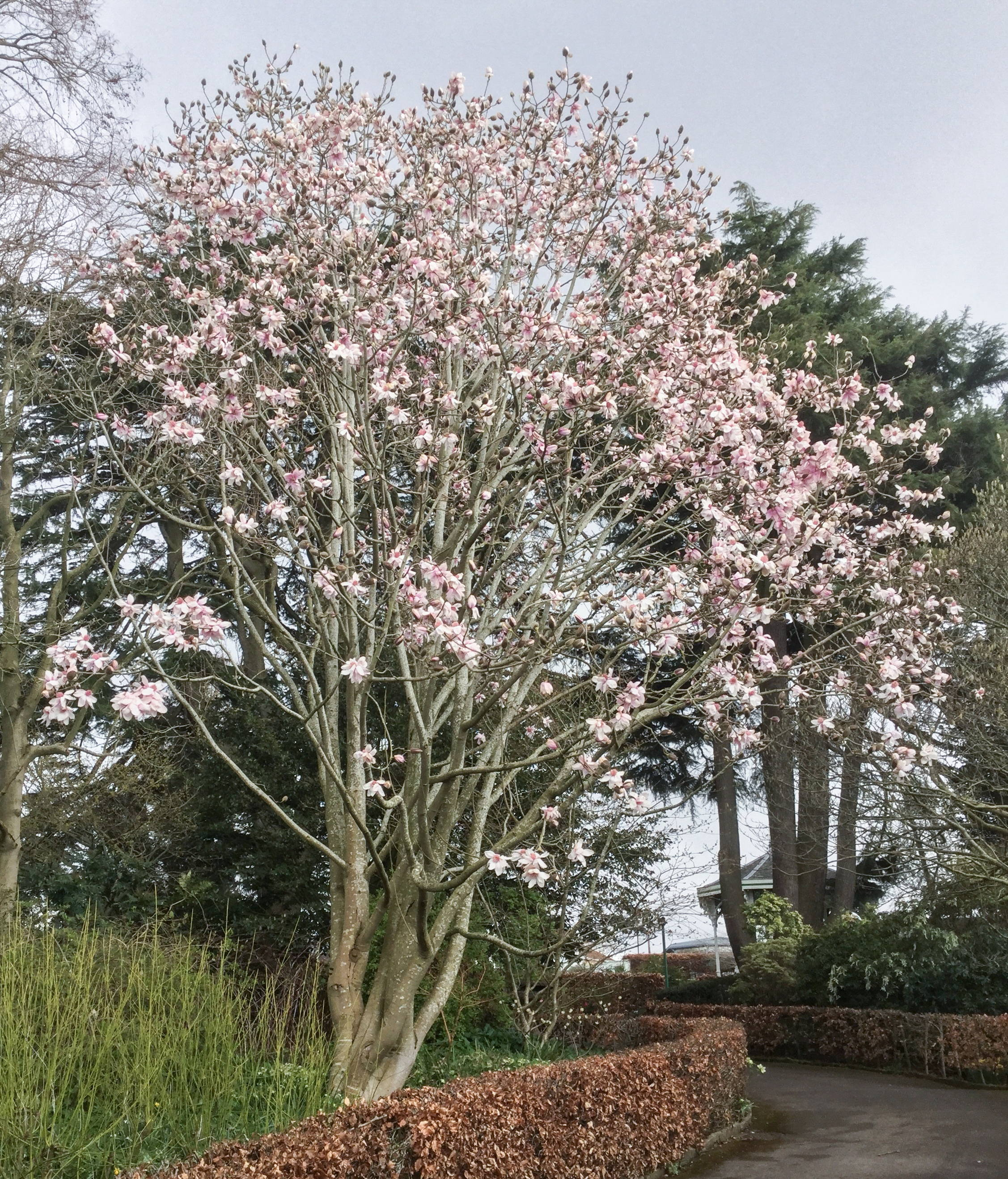
- In cultivation in the Birmingham Botanical Gardens

Conservation status
- Endangered (IUCN 3.1)

Scientific classification
- Kingdom: Plantae
- Clade: Embryophytes
- Clade: Tracheophytes
- Clade: Spermatophytes
- Clade: Angiosperms
- Clade: Magnoliids
- Order: Magnoliales
- Family: Magnoliaceae
- Genus: Magnolia
- Subgenus: Magnolia subg. Yulania
- Section: Magnolia sect. Yulania
- Subsection: Magnolia subsect. Yulania
- Species: M. dawsoniana

Binomial name
- Magnolia dawsoniana Rehder & E.H.Wilson

Synonyms
- Yulania dawsoniana (Rehder & E.H.Wilson) D.L.Fu

= Magnolia dawsoniana =

Dawson's magnolia

Species of tree

Magnolia dawsoniana, known as Dawson's magnolia, is a magnolia species native to the provinces of Sichuan and Yunnan in China, usually at elevations of 1,400 to 2,500 m (4,600 to 8,200 ft).

== Description ==
It is a small, ornamental deciduous tree that can grow to heights of 20 m. Leaf shape is obovate to elliptic-obovate, 7.5–14 cm-long, and is bright green above and glaucous underneath. The white to reddish flowers are large (16–25 cm wide), fragrant, and appear before leaves. It was first discovered in western Sichuan in 1869 by Père Jean Pierre Armand and was introduced in western cultivation in 1908, when E.H. Wilson sent seeds from plants growing near Kangding, Sichuan, to Arnold Arboretum in Jamaica Plain, Massachusetts. They are, however, rarely cultivated.

Magnolia dawsoniana is cold hardy to USDA hardiness zone 6.

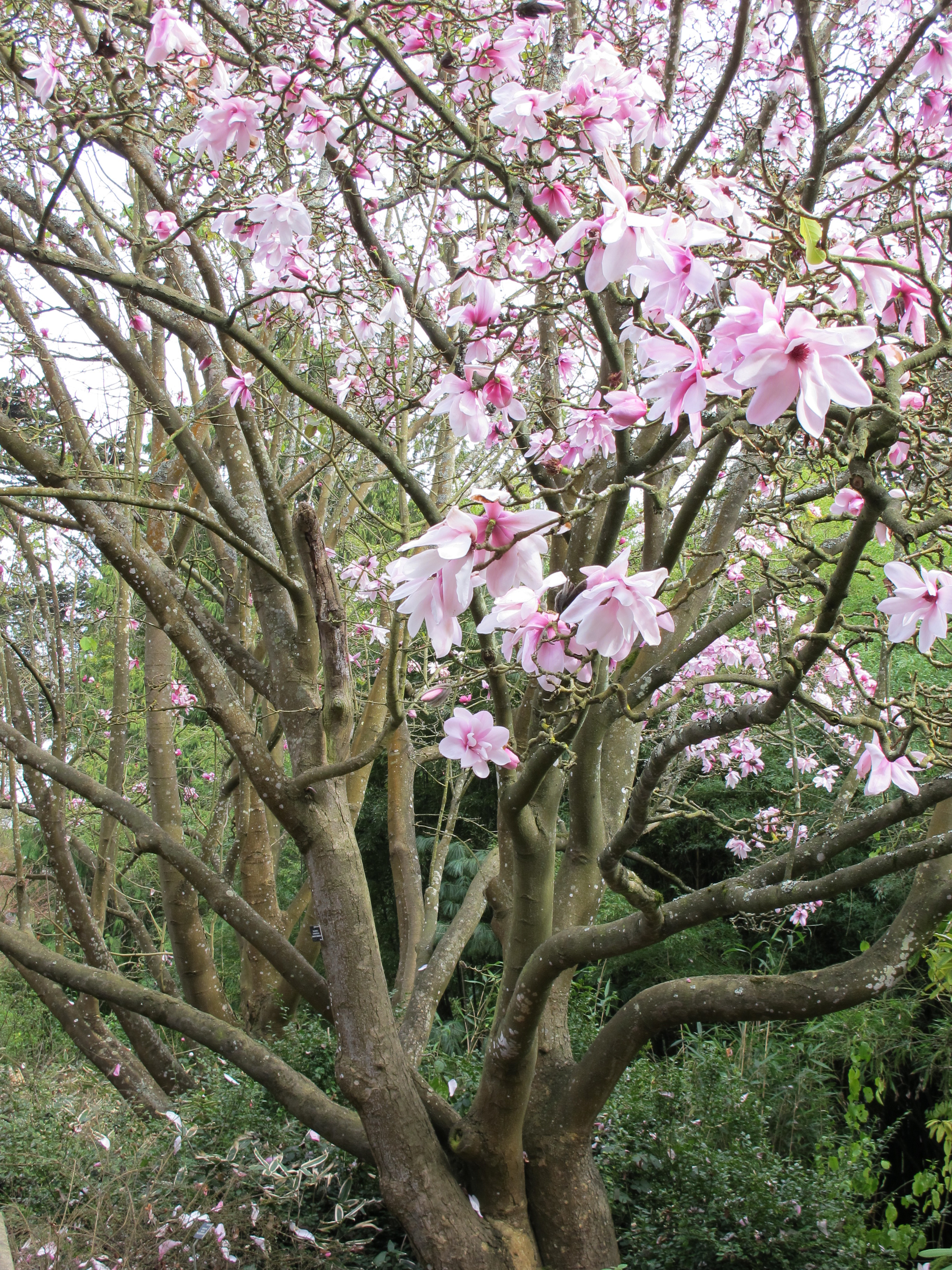

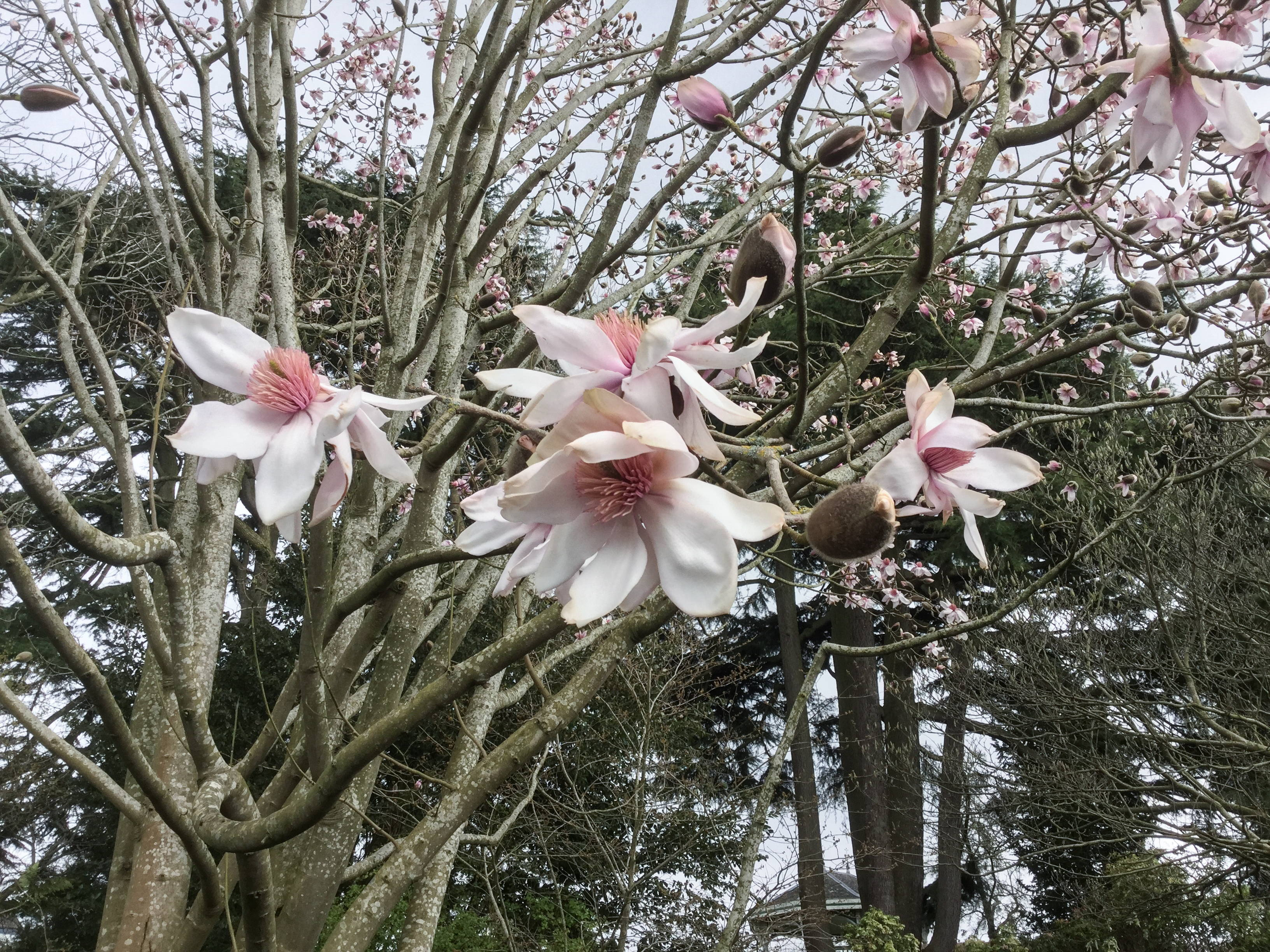
Flowers

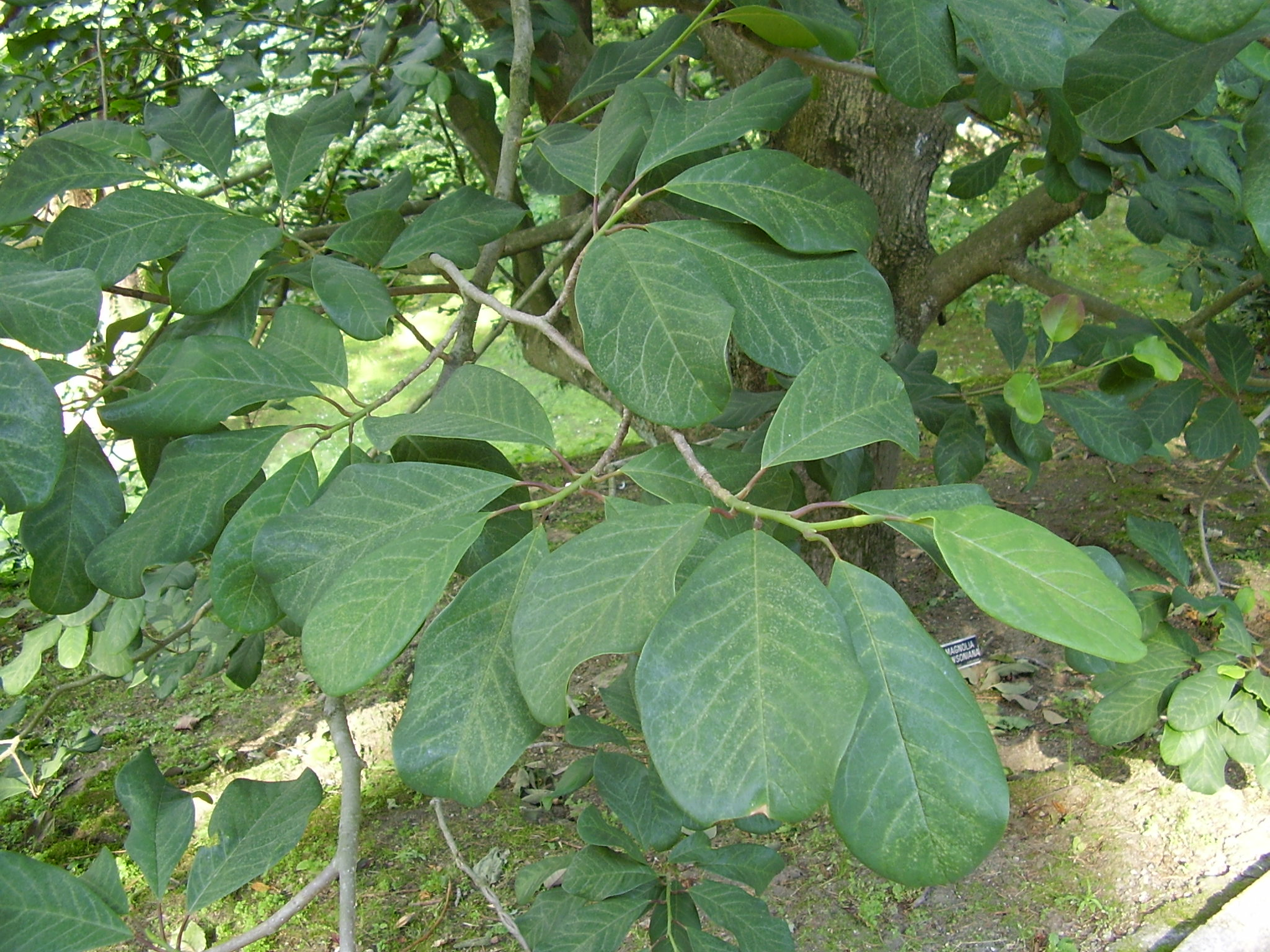
Leaves
