= Dawson Harron =

English cricketer

Personal information
- Full name: Dawson Gascoigne Harron
- Born: 12 September 1921; Langley Park, County Durham, England
- Died: 21 July 1988 (aged 66); Coventry, Warwickshire, England
- Batting: Right-handed

Domestic team information
- Years: Team
- 1951: Leicestershire
- 1947–1948: Durham

Career statistics
| Competition | First-class |
|---|---|
| Matches | 10 |
| Runs scored | 186 |
| Batting average | 15.50 |
| 100s/50s | –/1 |
| Top score | 53 |
| Balls bowled | – |
| Wickets | – |
| Bowling average | – |
| 5 wickets in innings | – |
| 10 wickets in match | – |
| Best bowling | – |
| Catches/stumpings | 2/– |
- Source: Cricinfo, 8 September 2011

Dawson Gascoigne Harron (12 September 1921 – 21 July 1988) was an English cricketer. Harron was a right-handed batsman. He was born at Langley Park, County Durham.

Harron made his debut for Durham in the 1947 Minor Counties Championship against Staffordshire. He played Minor counties cricket for Durham from 1947 to 1949, making five Minor Counties Championship appearances.

Harron later joined Leicestershire, making his first-class debut for the county against Middlesex in the 1951 County Championship. He made nine further first-class appearances in 1951, the last of which came against Yorkshire. In his ten first-class matches, he scored a total of 186 runs at an average of 15.50, with a high score of 53. This score, which was his only first-class fifty, came against Surrey.

He died at Coventry, Warwickshire on 21 July 1988.
