= Dawson Farm =

Historic house in Maryland, United States

- U.S. National Register of Historic Places
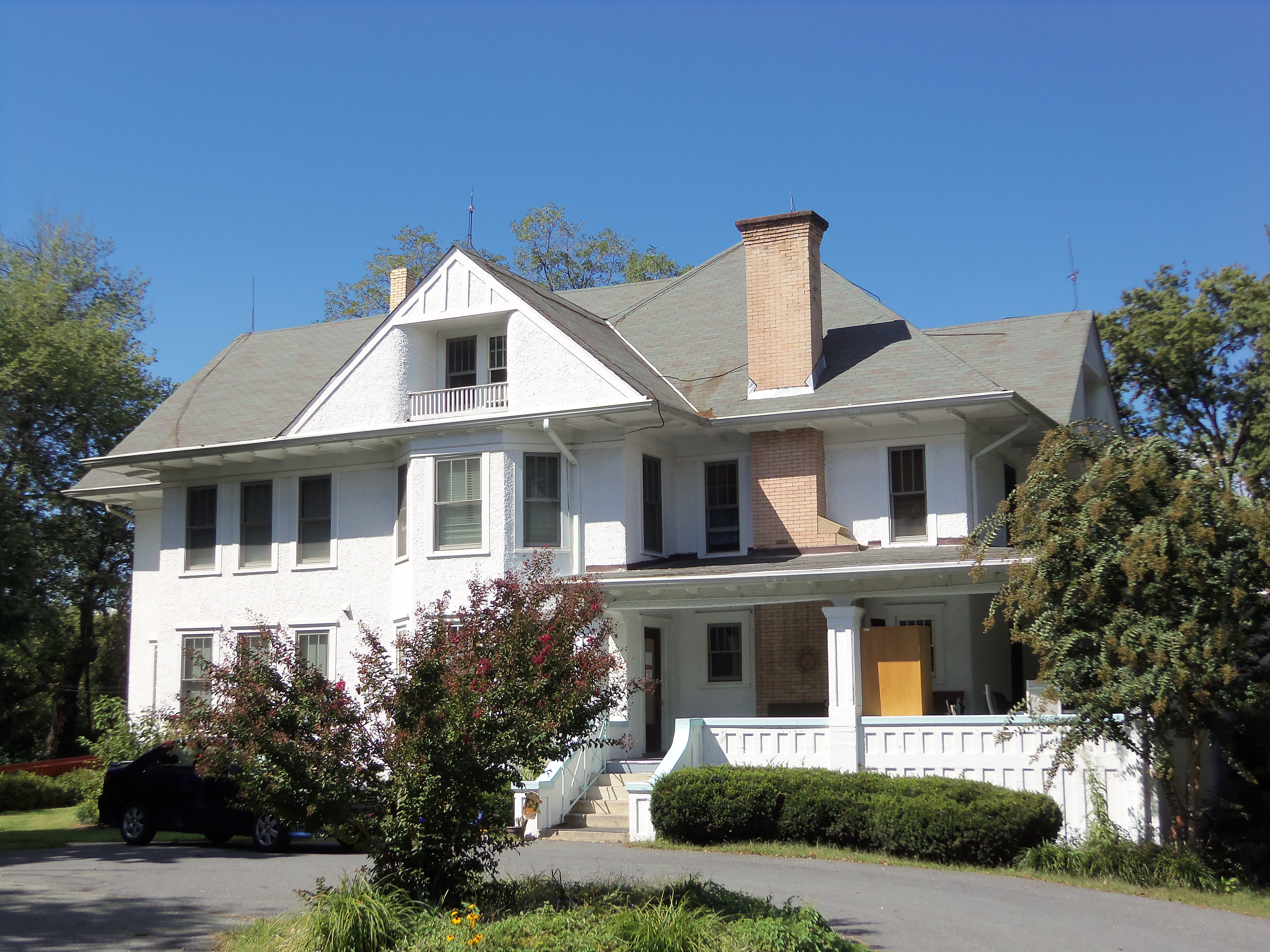
- Dawson Farmhouse, September 2012

- Location within Maryland Location within the United States
- Location: 1070 and 1080 Copperstone Ct., Rockville, Maryland
- Coordinates: 39°4′28″N 77°8′33″W
- Area: 6.1 acres (2.5 ha)
- Built: 1874, 1912
- NRHP reference No.: 85000060
- Added to NRHP: January 11, 1985

Dawson Farm, also known as "Rocky Glen," is a historic property with two homes located at Rockville, Montgomery County, Maryland. The property contains two dwellings: the 1874, 2 1/2-story, frame Dawson Farmhouse and a large 2 1/2-story hip-roofed frame house dating to 1912.

It was listed on the National Register of Historic Places in 1985.
