= Lower Tyrone Township, Pennsylvania =

Township in Pennsylvania, US

Coordinates: 40°04′38″N 79°40′39″W

Lower Tyrone Township
- Township
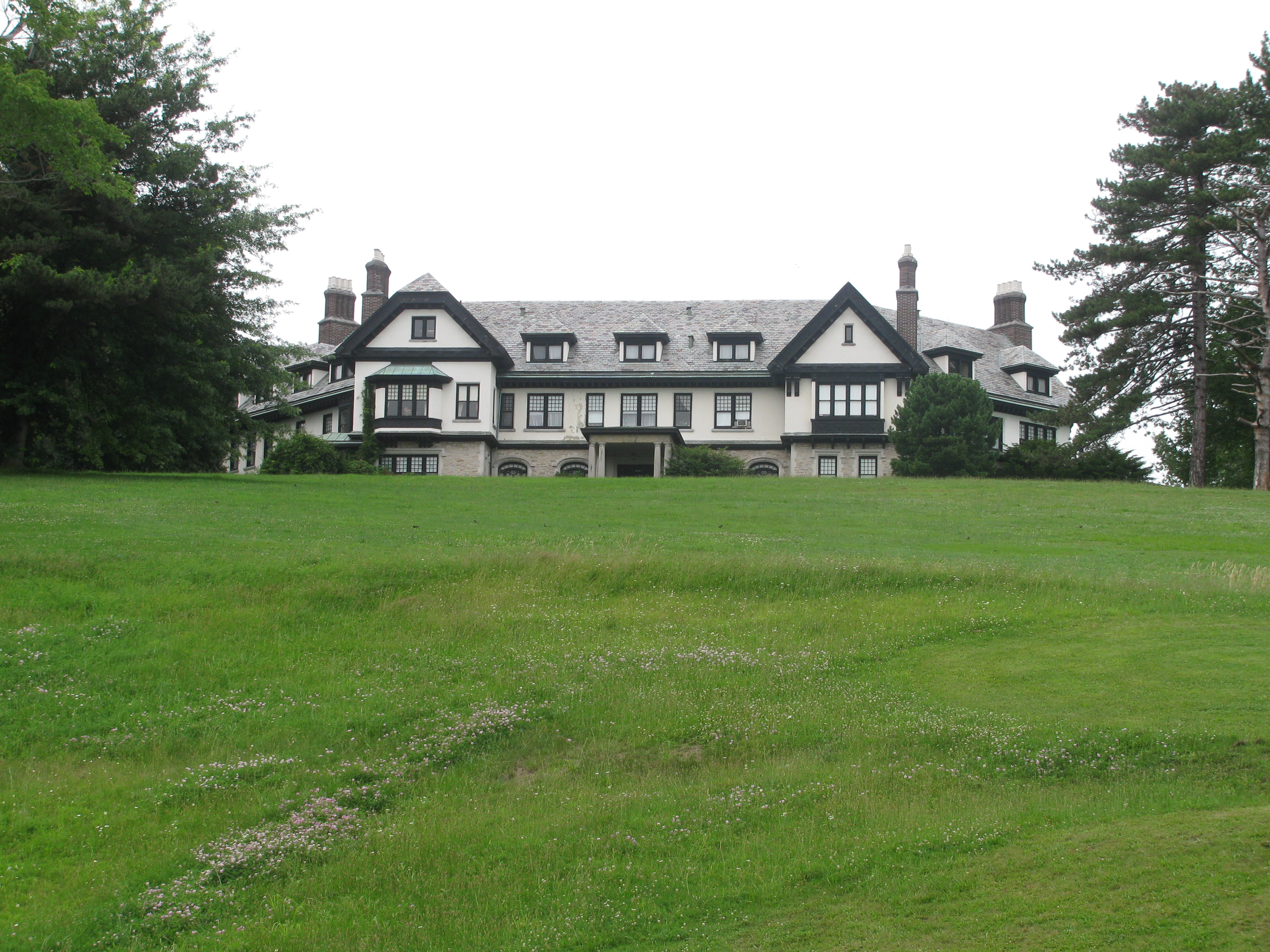
- Linden Hall (1911); National Register of Historic Places

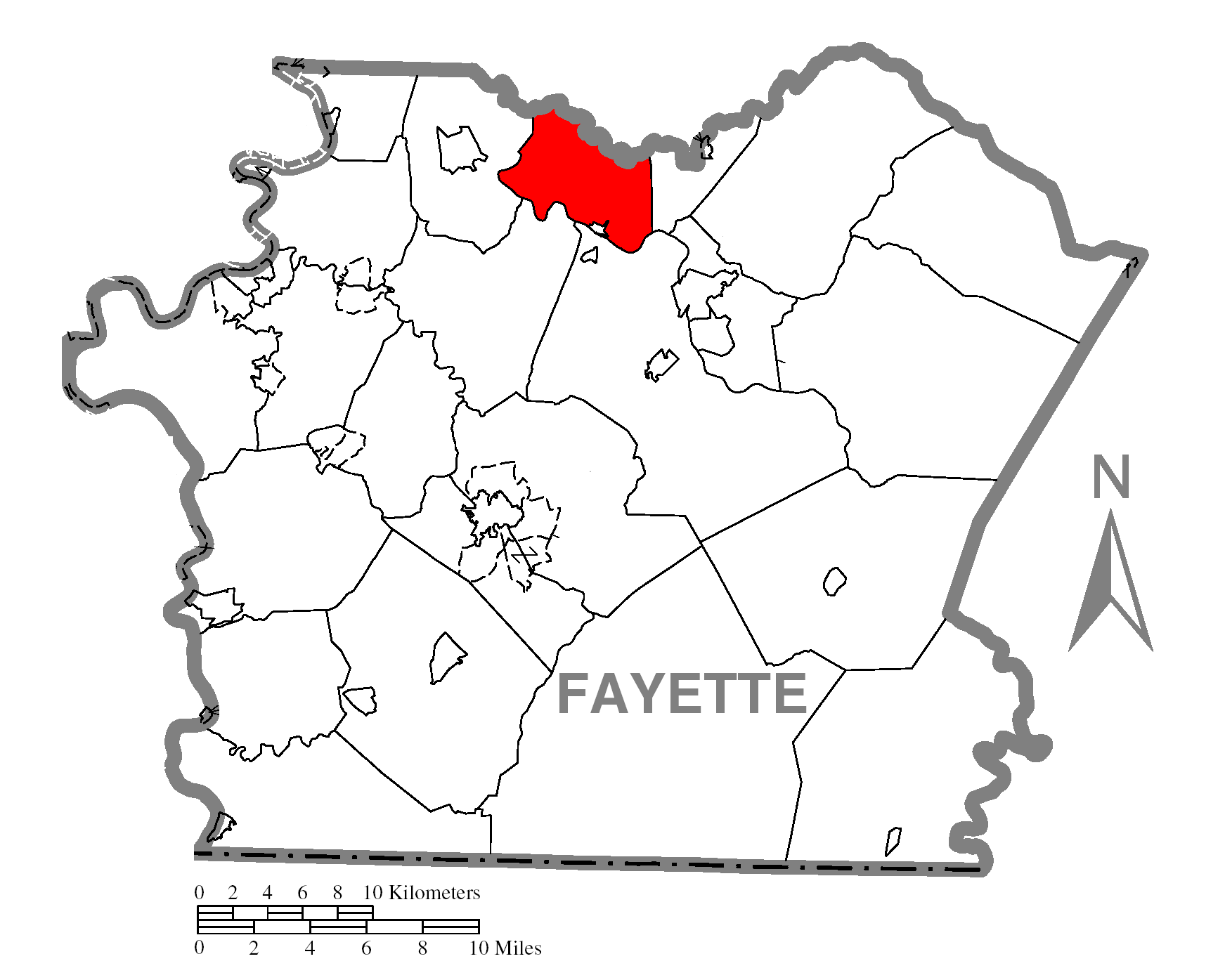
- Location of Lower Tyrone Township in Fayette County

- Location of Fayette County in Pennsylvania
- Country: United States
- State: Pennsylvania
- County: Fayette

Area
  - Total: 16.13 sq mi (41.77 km^{2})
  - Land: 15.88 sq mi (41.12 km^{2})
  - Water: 0.25 sq mi (0.66 km^{2})

Population (2020)
  - Total: 1,069 ▼
  - Estimate (2022): 1,047
  - Density: 68.7/sq mi (26.51/km^{2})
- Time zone: UTC-4 (EST)
  - Summer (DST): UTC-5 (EDT)
- Area code: 724
- FIPS code: 42-051-45144
- Website: https://www.lowertyronetwp.com/

Lower Tyrone Township is a township in Fayette County, Pennsylvania, United States. The population was 1,069 at the time of the 2020 census.

The township is named after County Tyrone, Northern Ireland. It is the site of Linden Hall, an early 20th-century mansion and resort which is listed on the National Register of Historic Places. The Frazier School District serves the township.

Hulltown and Raineytown are unincorporated communities in the township.

== Geography ==
The township is situated on the northern edge of Fayette County, bordered to the north by Westmoreland County. Jacobs Creek forms the northern township border and the county line, while the Youghiogheny River forms the southern township border. The borough of Dawson, a separate municipality, is on the southern edge of the township along the Youghiogheny.

Pennsylvania Route 819 crosses the township, leading northeast to Scottdale and south through Dawson and across the Youghiogheny to Vanderbilt.

According to the United States Census Bureau, Lower Tyrone Township has a total area of 16.1 square miles (41.8 km^{2}), of which 15.9 square miles (41.1 km^{2}) is land and 0.27 square miles (0.7 km^{2}), or 1.57%, is water.

== Demographics ==
Historical population
Census	Pop.	Note	%±
2010	1,123		—
2020	1,069		−4.8%
2022 (est.)	1,047		−2.1%
U.S. Decennial Census

As of the 2000 census, there were 1,171 people, 461 households, and 342 families residing in the township. The population density was 73.9 inhabitants per square mile (28.5/km^{2}). There were 480 housing units at an average density of 30.3 per square mile (11.7/km^{2}). The racial makeup of the township was 99.40% White, 0.34% African American, 0.09% Native American, and 0.17% from two or more races. Hispanic or Latino of any race were 0.09% of the population.

There were 461 households, out of which 31.5% had children under the age of 18 living with them, 61.6% were married couples living together, 8.2% had a female householder with no husband present, and 25.6% were non-families. 23.4% of all households were made up of individuals, and 10.8% had someone living alone who was 65 years of age or older. The average household size was 2.54 and the average family size was 2.98.

In the township the population was spread out, with 21.9% under the age of 18, 7.0% from 18 to 24, 28.0% from 25 to 44, 27.1% from 45 to 64, and 16.0% who were 65 years of age or older. The median age was 40 years. For every 100 females, there were 104.4 males. For every 100 females age 18 and over, there were 106.3 males.

The median income for a household in the township was $31,019, and the median income for a family was $36,731. Males had a median income of $30,804 versus $16,528 for females. The per capita income for the township was $13,995. About 11.5% of families and 13.5% of the population were below the poverty line, including 21.9% of those under age 18 and 8.6% of those age 65 or over.
