= Dawson Building =

- U.S. National Register of Historic Places
- U.S. Historic district – Contributing property
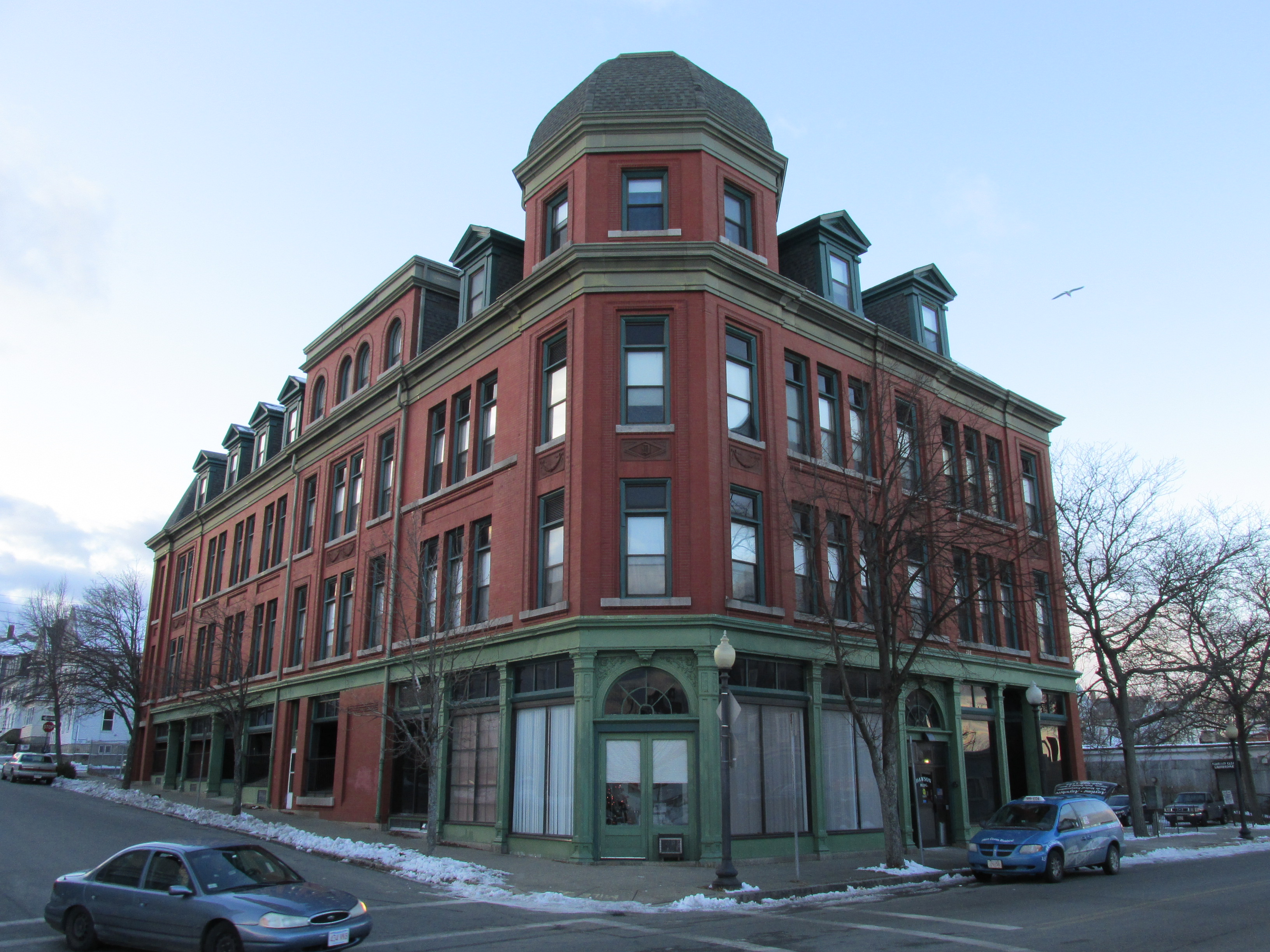

- Location within Massachusetts Location within the United States
- Location: 1851 Purchase Street, New Bedford, Massachusetts
- Coordinates: 41°39′0″N 70°55′48″W
- Built: 1896
- Architect: Samuel C. Hunt
- Architectural style: Classical Revival
- Part of: Acushnet Heights Historic District (ID89002035)
- NRHP reference No.: 82001900

Significant dates
- Added to NRHP: September 30, 1982
- Designated CP: December 1, 1989

The Dawson Building (also known as the Eagles Home) is a historic commercial building located at 1851 Purchase Street in New Bedford, Massachusetts.

== Description and history ==
It is a four-story, brick Classical Revival style building, whose most prominent feature is a large octagonal turret at the corner. It was constructed in 1896 for Benjamin Dawson, a grocer and liquor distributor. In 1923, it was purchased by the New Bedford Aeire #647 Fraternal Order of Eagles. It was added to the National Register of Historic Places in 1982, and included in the Acushnet Heights Historic District in 1989. The building has since been converted into a 32-unit affordable housing apartment building.

== See also ==
- National Register of Historic Places listings in New Bedford, Massachusetts
