= Dawson School =

- U.S. National Register of Historic Places
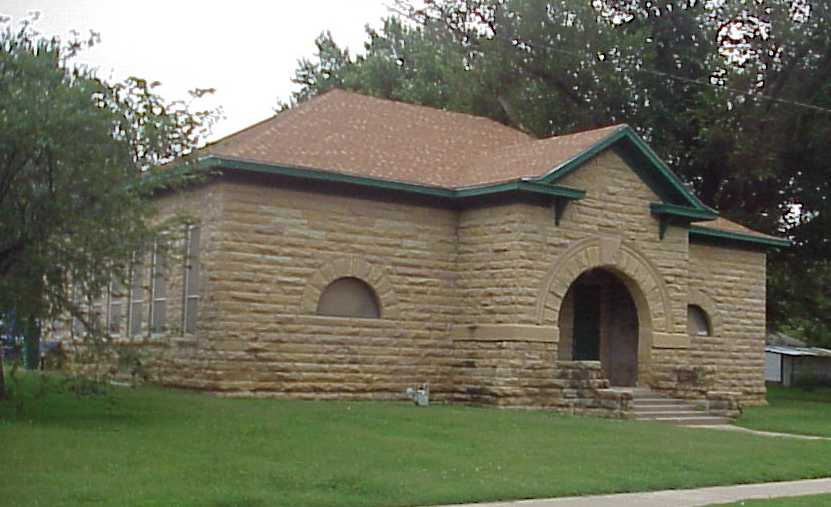
- Dawson School
- Location: Tulsa, OK
- Coordinates: 36°11′02″N 95°54′34″W
- Built: 1908
- Architectural style: Richardsonian Romanesque
- NRHP reference No.: 01001357
- Added to NRHP: December 7, 2001

Dawson School is a historic school building located in Tulsa, Oklahoma at the intersection of East Ute Place and North Kingston Place. It was listed on the National Register of Historic Places in 2001. This two-room sandstone building was built in 1908 in Romanesque style. It is a surviving example of the school building boom that occurred after Oklahoma statehood in 1907.

== Building history ==
The Dawson School Building was constructed in 1908, the year after Oklahoma became a state. A Tulsa newspaper (the Democrat) printed the following item:

A government school began at Dawson with an enrollment of 60. The term now will be four months but school will begin in September will be for nine months. The salary of the teacher and other expenses are paid by the Cherokee Nation and the U.S. Government. "

Dawson's school district was incorporated into that of the city of Tulsa in 1927. Children in the seventh and eighth grades were sent from Dawson to Tulsa's Cleveland Junior High School. In 1929, Tulsa's Board of Education approved construction of a new elementary school to serve the Dawson area and to open in 1930. The 1908 building became surplus property. For historical purposes, the Tulsa Board returned the old building to the community of Dawson. The retired school building became a community activity center for Dawson, a town named in honor of its first postmaster W.A. Dawson, and was the only public building until a firehouse was constructed in 1942. The entire community was annexed by Tulsa in 1948.

The former school is almost the only remaining structure existing as a reminder of the former town of Dawson. Almost all of the other two-room schools that were built before or during the first two decades of the 20th Century have been demolished long ago. Dawson School was listed on the National Register of Historic Places in 2001.

== Building description ==
The Dawson School Building is one-story high and contains two rooms. The exterior is constructed of sandstone, and has a Romanesque architectural design. The hipped roof is covered with asphalt. The windows are metal, one-over-one and double-hung, with a mesh cover to protect against breakage. The building is aptly described as "utilitarian" and "unpretentious" because there is minimal architectural detail and ornamentation. The building features an arched partial porch and semicircular windows flanking the porch. It originally had a bell tower above the porch. The date when the tower was removed is unknown.
