= Dawson Historic District =

Historic district in Pennsylvania, United States

- U.S. National Register of Historic Places
- U.S. Historic district
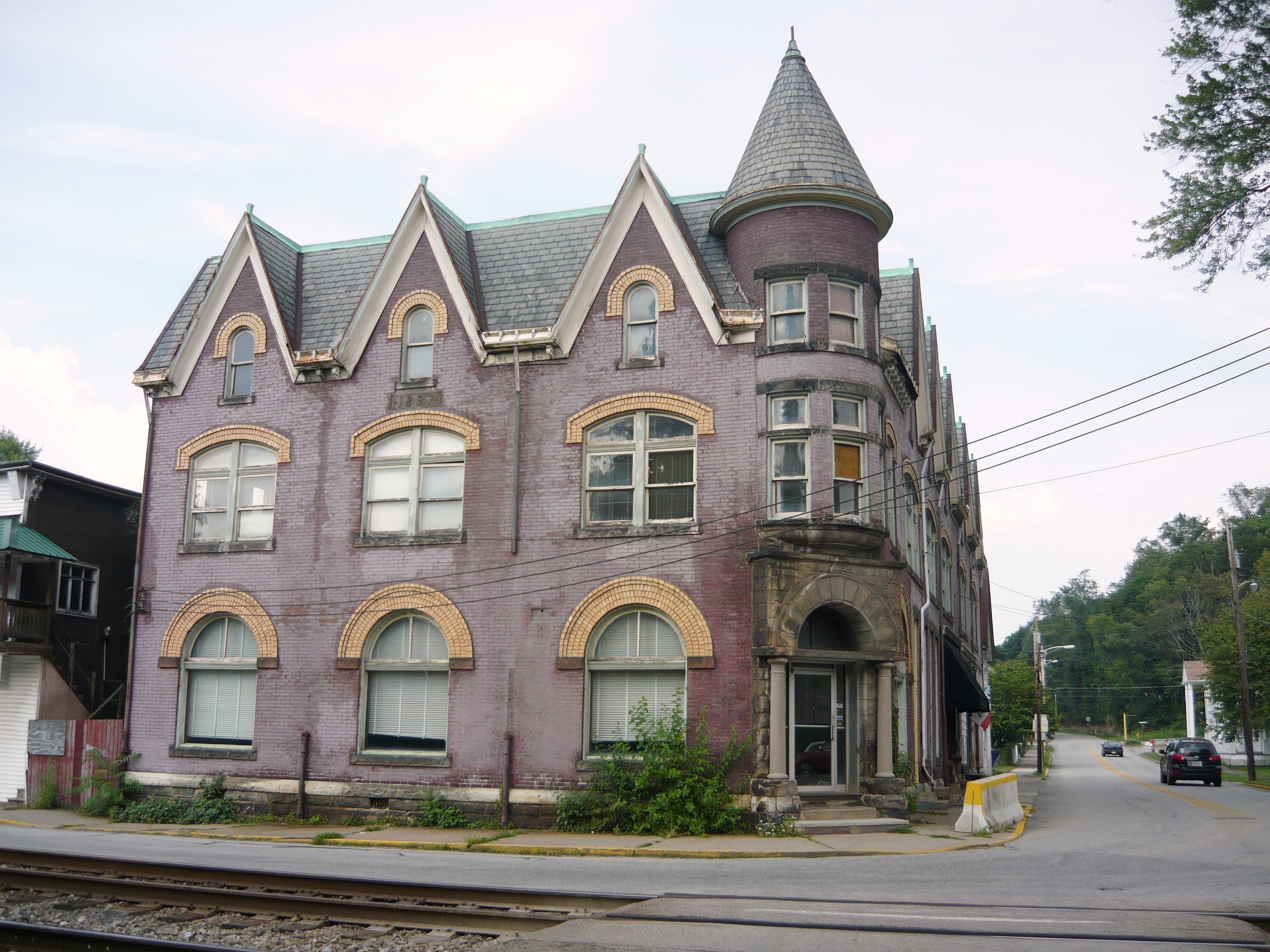
- First National Bank of Dawson, August 2011

- Location within Pennsylvania Location within the United States
- Location: Roughly bounded by Howell St., Middle Alley, Youghiogheny R, River Rd., and Spring, and Locust Alleys, Dawson, Pennsylvania
- Coordinates: 40°02′48″N 79°39′31″W
- Area: 35.5 acres (14.4 ha)
- Built: 1872; 154 years ago
- Architect: Thomas Pringle
- Architectural style: Bungalow/craftsman, Classical Revival, Queen Anne
- NRHP reference No.: 97001252
- Added to NRHP: November 5, 1997

Dawson Historic District is a national historic district located in Dawson, Fayette County, Pennsylvania. The district includes 107 contributing buildings in the central business district and surrounding residential areas of Dawson. The oldest building is the log Cochran House (c. 1820). Most of the contributing buildings were built between 1870 and 1940, and are representative of a number of popular architectural styles including Bungalow / American Craftsman, Classical Revival, and Queen Anne. Other notable buildings include the Dawson Baptist Church (c. 1870), James Cochran House, W. H. Cochran House (1880s), Rist House (1880s), First National Bank (1897), and Masonic Hall (c. 1890). The Cochran Memorial United Methodist Church is located in the district and listed separately.

It was added to the National Register of Historic Places in 1997.

== Gallery ==
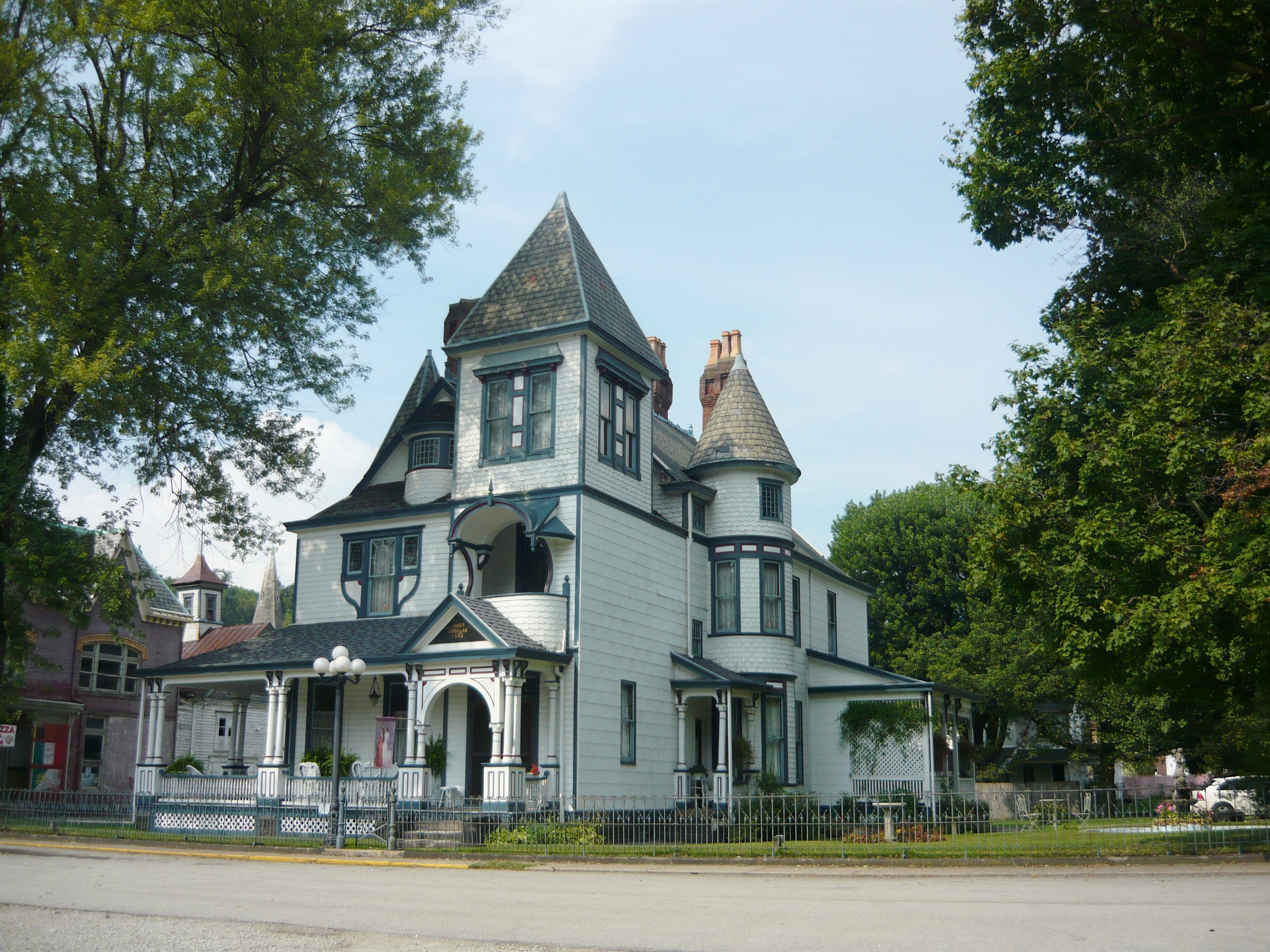
James Cochran House, August 2011
