= Dawson Brothers Plant =

- U.S. National Register of Historic Places
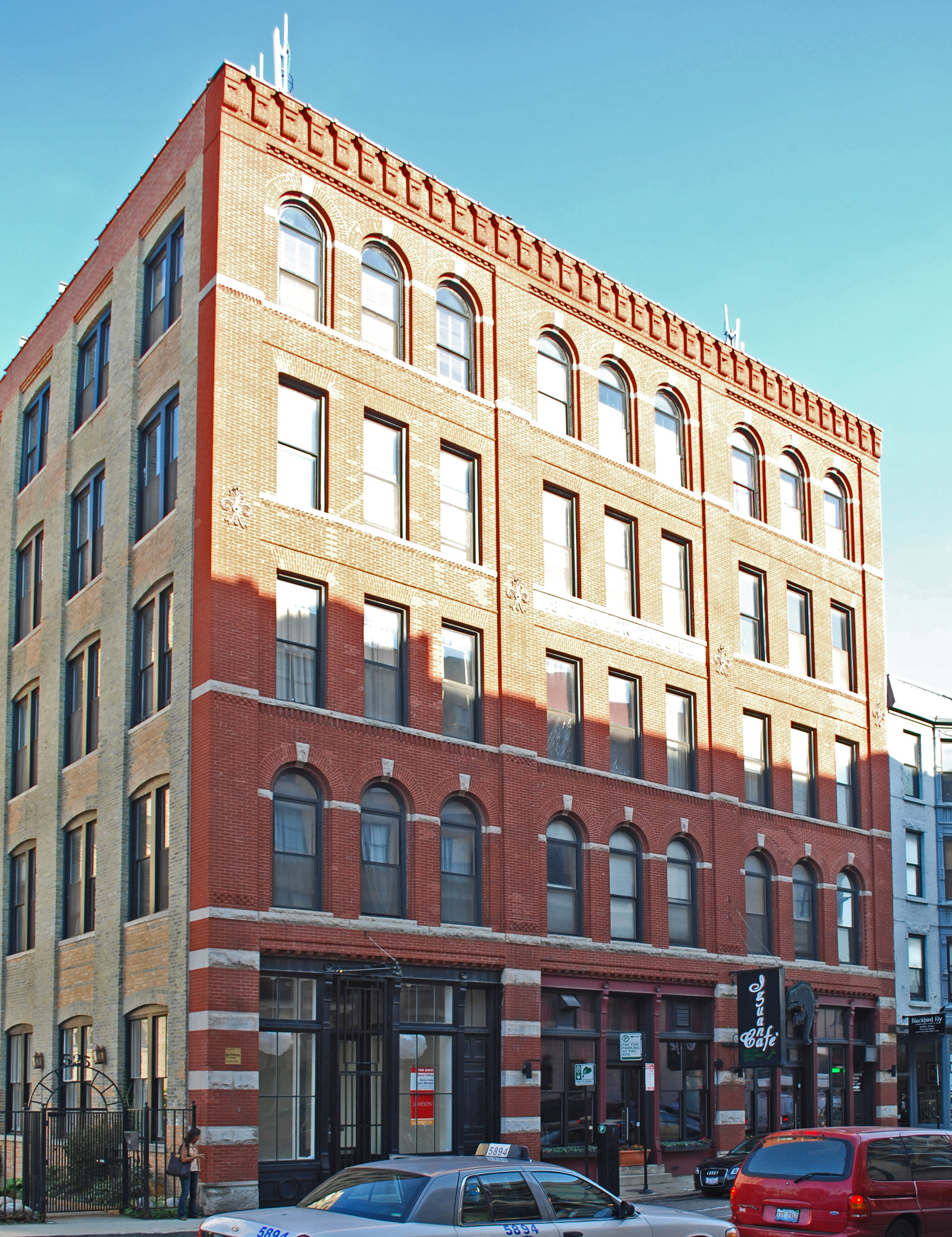

- Location within Illinois Location within the United States
- Location: 517-519 N. Halsted St., Chicago, Illinois
- Coordinates: 41°53′31″N 87°38′50″W
- Area: less than one acre
- Built: 1888
- Architect: Julius Zittel; Harold M. Hansen (1901 addition)
- NRHP reference No.: 85000265
- Added to NRHP: February 14, 1985

The Dawson Brothers Plant is a historic factory building located at 517-519 N. Halsted Street in the West Town community area of Chicago, Illinois. The factory was built in 1888 and designed by Julius Zittel; the five-story brick building has a cast iron front on its first floor and lacks ornamentation. The Dawson Brothers used the factory to produce fireplace mantels and grates; the building also served as the company's showroom and offices. A six-story addition was added to the building in 1901; this addition mainly served as a storage and shipping area. The Dawson Brothers conducted business at the factory until the 1920s. The building was added to the National Register of Historic Places on February 14, 1985.
