= Linden Hall at Saint James Park =

Historic house in Pennsylvania, United States

- U.S. National Register of Historic Places
- U.S. Historic district
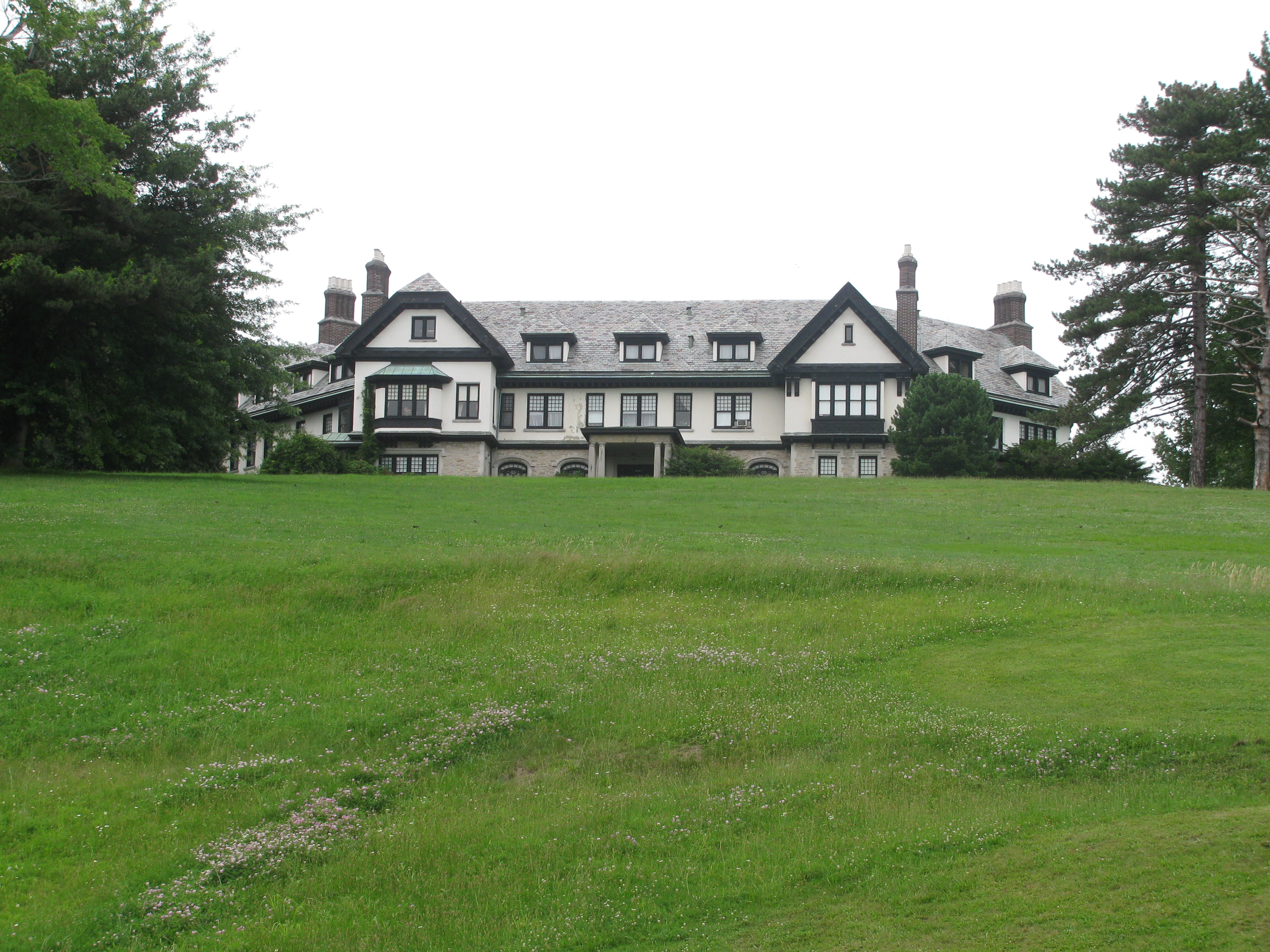
- Linden Hall at Saint James Park, July 2009

- Location within Pennsylvania Location within the United States
- Location: RR 26051 northwest of Dawson, Lower Tyrone Township, Pennsylvania
- Coordinates: 40°04′01″N 79°41′45″W
- Area: 9 acres (3.6 ha)
- Built: 1911; 115 years ago
- Architect: Kuntz, Joseph Franklin; Thompson & Starrett
- Architectural style: Tudor Revival
- NRHP reference No.: 89001787
- Added to NRHP: October 11, 1989

Linden Hall at Saint James Park is a historic estate and national historic district located at Lower Tyrone Township, Fayette County, Pennsylvania. The district includes three contributing buildings, one contributing structure, and one contributing object. The mansion was built by Sarah B. Cochran between 1909 and 1911, and is a 2 1/2-story, stone and stucco dwelling in the Tudor Revival style. The mansion has 31 rooms and is in the shape of a crescent. It is atop a hill at a 1,360-foot (410 m) elevation that affords a panoramic view of the surrounding area. Also on the property are the contributing garage and chauffeur's residence, gardens, and pool pavilion. It was a private residence until 1944, when it was sold to the Order of Saint Basil the Great as a novitiate. In 1957, it was sold to the St. James Country Club, and the property was developed as a country club in the 1960s and 1970s. It was sold to the United Steelworkers in 1976.

It was added to the National Register of Historic Places in 1998.

"Garden Landscape," the Tiffany window that Sarah Cochran had commissioned for Linden Hall, was designed by Agnes Northrop and acquired by the Metropolitan Museum of Art in 2023.

== See also ==
- Sarah B. Cochran
