= Upper Tyrone =

Upper Tyrone may refer to:

- Upper Tyrone Township, Fayette County, Pennsylvania, United States
- County of Upper Tyrone, former county in Ireland
