= Southwest Pennsylvania Railroad =

Short line railroad in the United States

Overview
- Headquarters: Oakmont, Pennsylvania
- Reporting mark: SWP
- Locale: Fayette County, Pennsylvania; Westmoreland County, Pennsylvania
- Dates of operation: 1995–

Technical
- Track gauge: 4 ft 8 1/2 in (1,435 mm) standard gauge
- Length: 66

Other
- Website: carloadexpress.com/railroads/southwest-pennsylvania-railroad/

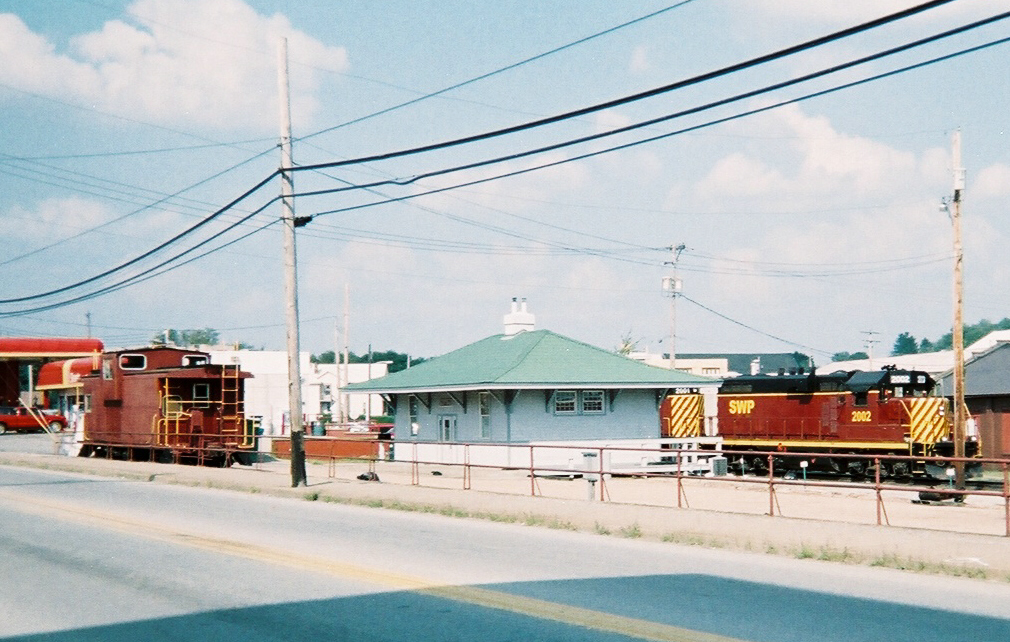
SWP GP11 2002, which was used in the movie Unstoppable, at the Scottdale train station

The Southwest Pennsylvania Railroad (reporting mark SWP) is a shortline railroad that operates in southwestern Pennsylvania. The SWP uses rail branches that were acquired from CSX Transportation (originally the Baltimore and Ohio Railroad) and Conrail (originally the Pennsylvania Railroad). All of the track used by the SWP is in either Fayette or Westmoreland counties. SWP provides local service to many customers in the area, connecting them to the outside world via interchanges with Norfolk Southern, Wheeling & Lake Erie Railroad, and CSX. SWP has been vital in the location of several new industries to Fayette and Westmoreland Counties in recent years.

The main line of the SWP railroad runs as far north as Radebaugh in Hempfield Township. It then passes Greensburg and Scottdale (the location of the railyard) to an interchange with NS and W&LE in Everson. The SWP mainline passes through the coal towns of Owensdale and Broadford, before reaching a junction with CSX. It operates over CSX tracks through Connellsville, where it leaves CSX to run south through Dunbar and Mt Braddock to Uniontown. The route ends after passing through Fairchance and Smithfield. Near the end of the line in Smithfield is a new large fracking-sand facility owned by Hi-Crush Partners, which receives 40 ft covered hoppers.

The railroad features several branch lines. One travels to Yukon (in South Huntingdon Township) to serve a box and packaging facility. Another branch runs from Everson to Mt. Pleasant, Pennsylvania and New Stanton. Here, the Westmoreland Rail Freight Terminal, a large bulk transload facility, is served. This location also has a new ethanol plant under construction. The Bullskin Branch serves a small coal loadout named Bullskin Tipple which actually is in Connellsville Township, Pennsylvania. It is only used occasionally. Southwest Pennsylvania Railroad's operational headquarters are located in Oakmont, Pennsylvania. The SWP is operated by Carload Express, Inc., which also operates two other shortline railroads: The Allegheny Valley Railroad (AVR) serving the Pittsburgh area and the Delmarva Central Railroad.

The current SWP roster consists of SWP 4006 GP40-2 mated with SWP 406 slug, which in combination are referred to as an HD40-2 by Southwest Pennsylvania Railroad. This combination has 3000 HP, 8 powered axles and two fuel tanks. SWP 4006 was repainted and SWP 406 was rebuilt by Metro East Industries, Inc. of St. Louis, Ill in 2015. Other locomotives from sister railroad AVR are lent to SWP from time to time as needed.

== History ==
The Southwest Pennsylvania Railroad began operations in June 1995 when Trimax (now Carload Express) was selected to operate 66 miles (106 km) of railroad by the Westmoreland County Industrial Development Corporation and the Fay-Penn Industrial Development Corporation. In May 2000, the Southwest Pennsylvania Railroad started service to the Westmoreland Rail Freight terminal near New Stanton. The railroad began service to the Hunter Panels plant in the Fayette Business Park in Fairchance in 2006. In 2011, the Southwest Pennsylvania Railroad commenced service to the Fayette Rail Freight terminal in Smithfield. This facility is now operated by Hi-Crush Partners and serves unit trains of sand for hydraulic fracturing.

== Locomotive roster ==
Locomotive model	Road number
Road slug	406
EMD GP11	2001
EMD GP11	2002
EMD GP11	2003
EMD GP11	2006
EMD SD40-2	3501
EMD SD40-2	3504
EMD SD40-2	3503
EMD GP40-2	4005
EMD GP40-2	4006
EMD GP9r	4602
