= Owensdale, Pennsylvania =

Town in Pennsylvania, U.S.

Owensdale
- Unincorporated community
- Entrance to Owensdale from Broadford Road

- Location in Pennsylvania Owensdale (the United States)
- Coordinates: 40°04′35″N 79°36′13″W
- Country: United States
- State: Pennsylvania
- County: Fayette
- Township: Upper Tyrone
- Time zone: UTC-5 (Eastern (EST))
  - Summer (DST): UTC-4 (EDT)
- Area code: 724

Owensdale is an unincorporated community in the northern part of Fayette County, southwestern Pennsylvania, just north of Connellsville. Owensdale sits in the middle of rich coal fields, which played a huge part in the town's past. It is now home to the interchange between the Wheeling and Lake Erie Railway and the Southwest Pennsylvania Railroad.

== History ==
Pennsville Mennonite Cemetery (c. 1800)

The area around present-day Owensdale was settled during the late 18th century. In 1789, 1790, and 1791, several families acquired land in the Jacobs Creek Valley. Among them was John Stauffer, who purchased land at the site of what later became Owensdale. The community’s development accelerated during the 19th century with the growth of the Connellsville Coalfield. Upper Tyrone Township was initially dominated by farming and distilling, but coke production became the township’s principal industry during the second half of the 19th century. The construction of railroads through the township provided transportation for coal and coke and encouraged the development of mining settlements.

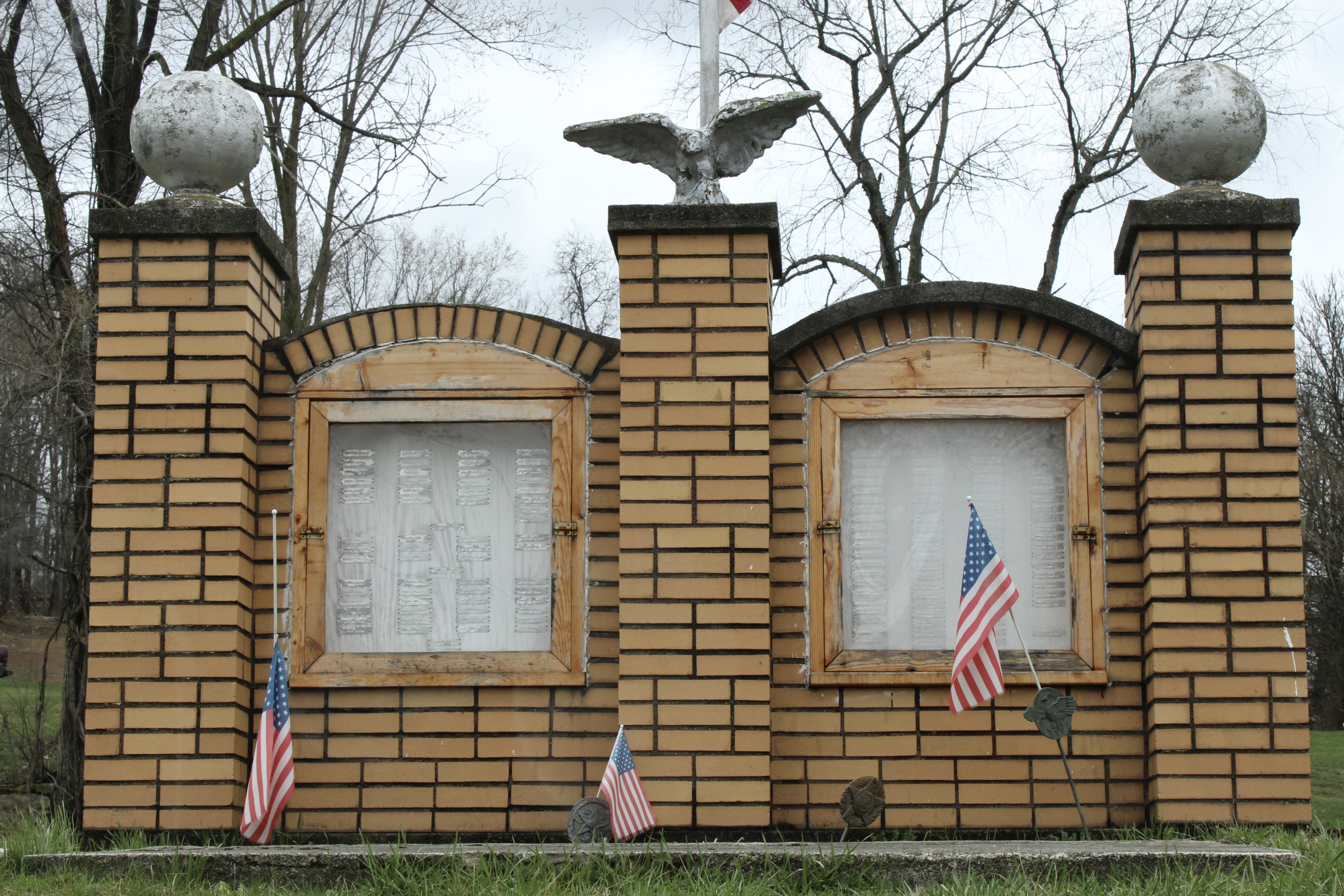
Owensdale honor roll

A mining settlement at the site of Owensdale was established by Jackson Shallenberger in 1872. The settlement was initially known as Owensdale, but the name was changed to Summit Mines on June 10, 1892. Despite the later use of the name Summit Mines, the name Owensdale continued to appear in geographic and postal records.

The Owensdale post office was established on February 24, 1881, with W. H. Shallenberger as postmaster. It was subsequently renamed Summit Mines. By the late 19th century, the community had developed several institutions associated with a coal-mining village, including a United Brethren church, a post office, two school rooms, and three stores. The stores included establishments operated by the Union Supply Company, Keister & Co., and W. H. Shallenberger.

Coal and coke production remained important to the community into the 20th century. A 1890 United States census bulletin on bituminous coal mines lists the Franklin coke works in Tyrone Township and identifies its operator as B. F. Keister & Co., with Owensdale given as the associated location.

The community was also served by religious institutions. The Owensdale United Brethren Church was organized in 1884, initially holding services in the Owensdale schoolhouse. A frame church was constructed and dedicated on August 30, 1884. The congregation later became affiliated with the United Methodist Church and remained an institution in the community into the 21st century.

Rail transportation became increasingly important to Owensdale and the surrounding mining communities. The modern railroad network through the area incorporates lines historically associated with the Pennsylvania Railroad, Baltimore and Ohio Railroad, and other regional railroads. The Southwest Pennsylvania Railroad operates through Owensdale and connects with the Wheeling and Lake Erie Railway. In 2000, the Pennsylvania Department of Environmental Protection documented a proposed railroad interchange at Owensdale connecting the Southwest Pennsylvania Railroad and the Wheeling and Lake Erie Railway. The project was located at the village of Owensdale in Upper Tyrone Township.

== Geography ==
Owensdale Methodist Church

Owensdale is located in northern Fayette County in Upper Tyrone Township. The community lies near the boundary with Westmoreland County and is situated within the Jacobs Creek drainage basin. Jacobs Creek forms the northern boundary of Upper Tyrone Township and Fayette County in this area.

Owensdale is surrounded by the former mining and coke-producing communities of northern Fayette and southern Westmoreland counties. Nearby communities include Everson, Scottdale, Dawson, Broadford, Morgan, Dry Hill, and McClure.

The Pennsylvania Department of Transportation identifies Owensdale on its Upper Tyrone Township highway map and shows the community in proximity to the Southwest Pennsylvania Railroad and Wheeling and Lake Erie Railway lines.

== Population ==
A home situated near the border of Bullskin, Pennsylvania and Owensdale (c. February 2026)

Owensdale is an unincorporated community and is not separately enumerated by the United States Census Bureau as a census-designated place. Consequently, no official decennial census population total is published specifically for Owensdale.

Owensdale is located within Upper Tyrone Township. The township had a population of 2,059 in the 2010 census and 1,768 in the 2020 census, a decline of approximately 14.1 percent. The Census Bureau estimated the township’s population at 1,726 in 2022.

== Economy ==
Owensdale’s historical economy was closely associated with coal mining and coke production. The community formed part of the broader Connellsville Coalfield, one of the principal bituminous coal-producing regions of southwestern Pennsylvania. Mining and coke production led to the construction of company housing, stores, schools, churches, and transportation facilities throughout the surrounding area.

== See also ==
- Upper Tyrone Township, Fayette County, Pennsylvania
- Connellsville Coalfield
- Connellsville, Pennsylvania
- Everson, Pennsylvania
- Southwest Pennsylvania Railroad
- Wheeling and Lake Erie Railway
