= Abraham Lincoln Keister =

American politician (1852–1917)

Abraham L. Keister
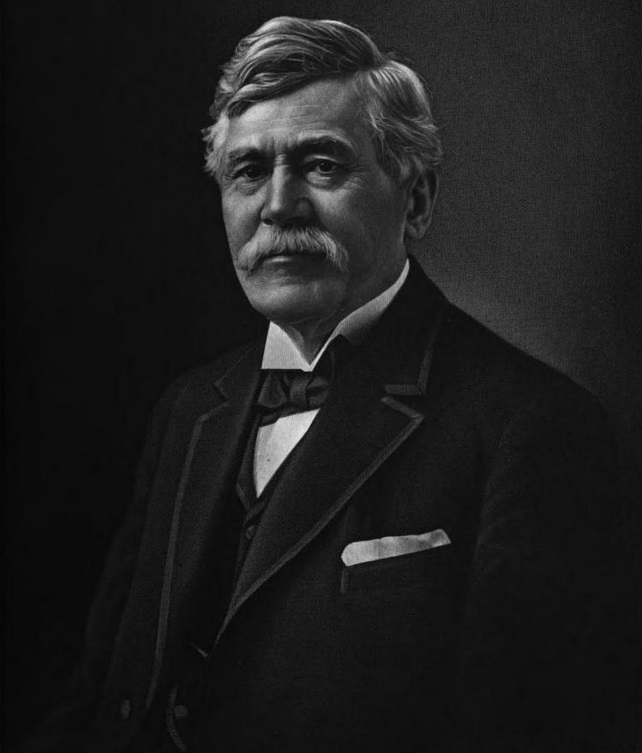
- From Volume III of 1918's Old and New Westmoreland

Member of the U.S. House of Representatives from Pennsylvania's 22nd district
- In office March 4, 1913 – March 3, 1917
- Preceded by: Curtis Hussey Gregg
- Succeeded by: Edward Everett Robbins

Personal details
- Born: September 10, 1852 Upper Tyrone Township, Pennsylvania, U.S.
- Died: May 26, 1917 (aged 64) Scottdale, Pennsylvania, U.S.
- Party: Republican
- Education: Otterbein College

Abraham Lincoln Keister (September 10, 1852 – May 26, 1917) was a Republican member of the U.S. House of Representatives from Pennsylvania.

== Biography ==
Abraham L. Keister was born on September 10, 1852, in Upper Tyrone Township, Pennsylvania. After graduating from Otterbein College in Westerville, Ohio in 1874, he studied law, was admitted to the bar by the supreme court of Ohio in 1878, and commenced practice in Columbus, Ohio.

In 1882, he moved to Fayette County, Pennsylvania, where he engaged in the manufacture of coke. Seven years later, he organized the First National Bank of Scottdale, Pennsylvania, and served continuously as its president for twenty-eight years.

In 1901, he organized the Scottdale Savings & Trust Co., and remained connected with this financial institution until his death. He also served as a member of the Scottdale Board of Education for more than twenty years.

Elected as a Republican to the Sixty-third and Sixty-fourth Congresses, he was an unsuccessful candidate for renomination in 1916, and resumed his former business pursuits until he died at his home in Scottdale, Pennsylvania, on May 26, 1917, aged 64. He was interred in the Scottdale Cemetery.

U.S. House of Representatives
Preceded by Curtis H. Gregg	Member of the U.S. House of Representatives from Pennsylvania's 22nd congressional district 1913–1917	Succeeded by Edward E. Robbins
