= Unstoppable (2010 film) =

2010 American disaster action film by Tony Scott

- Theatrical release poster
- Directed by: Tony Scott
- Written by: Mark Bomback
- Produced by: Julie Yorn; Tony Scott; Mimi Rogers; Eric McLeod; Alex Young
- Starring: Denzel Washington; Chris Pine; Rosario Dawson
- Cinematography: Ben Seresin
- Edited by: Chris Lebenzon; Robert Duffy
- Music by: Harry Gregson-Williams
- Production companies: Dune Entertainment; Scott Free Productions; Prospect Park; Millbrook Farm Productions
- Distributed by: 20th Century Fox
- Release dates: October 26, 2010 (Westwood); November 12, 2010 (United States)
- Running time: 98 minutes
- Country: United States
- Language: English
- Budget: $85–100 million
- Box office: $167.8 million

Unstoppable is a 2010 American disaster action thriller film directed and produced by Tony Scott, written by Mark Bomback, and starring Denzel Washington and Chris Pine. It is based on the real-life CSX 8888 incident, telling the story of a runaway freight train and the two men who attempt to stop it. It was the last film Scott directed before his death in 2012.

The film was released in the United States on November 12, 2010, by 20th Century Fox. It received generally positive reviews from critics and grossed $167.8 million against a production budget between $85–100 million. It was nominated for an Oscar for Best Sound Editing at the 83rd Academy Awards, and for Best Action Movie at the 2011 Critics' Choice Movie Awards, but lost to Inception in both cases.

== Plot ==
A botched switching operation by yard hostlers Dewey and Gilleece at an Allegheny and West Virginia Railroad (AWVR) yard in northern Pennsylvania results in a freight train pulled by locomotive 777 (Triple 7) heading south at full throttle, hauling 39 cars. Believing it is coasting, yardmaster Connie Hooper orders the two hostlers to pursue and board the train and sends lead welder Ned Oldham ahead in his truck to switch it off the main line. Ned arrives at the switch after the train has passed, and the crew realize that it is running on full power. Attempts by Dewey and Gilleece to board the train fail, prompting Connie to alert Oscar Galvin, Vice President of Operations, and coordinate with state police to block road crossings.

Federal Railroad Administration inspector Scott Werner warns that eight of the 39 cars contain phenol, a highly toxic and flammable chemical, which poses catastrophic risks if the train derails in a populated area. Despite Connie's suggestion to derail the train in unpopulated farmland, Galvin and AWVR's president reject the idea, prioritizing cost-saving measures. Instead, veteran engineer Judd Stewart is sent with another locomotive to slow Triple 7 enough to allow AWVR employee and U.S. Marine veteran Ryan Scott to board from a helicopter. The plan fails: Ryan is injured, and Stewart's locomotive derails and explodes, killing him. With Triple 7 approaching a dangerous curve above the heavily populated town of Stanton, Galvin reluctantly approves a controlled derailment near the smaller town of Arklow.

Meanwhile, veteran engineer Frank Barnes and rookie conductor Will Colson are moving freight cars with locomotive 1206 going north on the same line as Triple 7. Frank, a seasoned railroad veteran facing forced early retirement, and Will, who is preoccupied with a restraining order from his wife Darcy, are ordered to pull off onto a siding RIP track just before the runaway races by, smashing through their last boxcar. Frank notices an open coupler on Triple 7's rear car and proposes coupling 1206 to it, then using their brakes to slow it before it reaches the Stanton Curve. Frank predicts that the portable derailers set up at Arklow will fail due to Triple 7's weight and speed.

Galvin dismisses the plan, threatening to fire Frank, Will, and Connie when she supports them. Ignoring him, Frank and Will leave their freight cars on the siding and proceed with their pursuit, running 1206 in reverse. As predicted, the derailers fail when Triple 7 barrels through them unhindered. Galvin is left to appear foolish and Connie calls him out on it. Connie and Werner, realizing Frank's plan is their only option, override Galvin and coordinate support.

Frank and Will catch up to Triple 7, and Will exits 1206's cab to complete the coupling. When the locking pin will not engage, Will kicks it into place, but his foot gets crushed. Despite the injury, he hobbles back to the cab and Frank while still in control appears to slow down Triple Seven according to 1206's speedometer. However the cab brakes are wearing out and the train is gaining speed again. Will devises a plan to slow down Triple Seven by breaking the freight cars. Will goes and takes control of the dynamic brakes while Frank climbs atop the freight cars to manually engage the handbrakes, car by car. Their efforts initially slow Triple 7, but eventually, 1206's brakes burn out, and Triple 7 begins accelerating again.

Using the independent air brake, Will and Frank coordinate their brake timing via radio, reducing speed enough to avoid derailing on the elevated Stanton Curve bridge. However, Frank is blocked from reaching Triple 7's locomotive by a bulkhead flatcar with no walkway. Ned arrives in his truck, speeding alongside the tracks with the police escorting him. Will jumps onto the truck bed, and Ned races ahead of the train. Will leaps onto Triple 7's engine, gains control, and brings the runaway train to a stop. There is later a press conference where Frank, Will, and Ned are commended for their actions.

In the aftermath, Will reunites with Darcy and their son, learning that she's pregnant with their second child. Frank is promoted and later retires with full benefits. Will recovers from his injuries and continues working with AWVR. Connie is promoted to VP of Operations, formerly Galvin's job. Ryan makes a full recovery, while Dewey ends up working in the fast-food industry.

== Cast ==
- Denzel Washington as Frank Barnes, a veteran railroad engineer
- Chris Pine as Will Colson, a young train conductor
- Rosario Dawson as Connie Hooper, the yardmaster of Fuller Yard
- Kevin Dunn as Oscar Galvin, VP of AWVR train operations
- Ethan Suplee as Dewey, a hostler who instigates the disaster
- Kevin Corrigan as Inspector Scott Werner, an FRA inspector who helps Connie
- Lew Temple as Ned Oldham, a railroad lead welder
- Kevin Chapman as Bunny, a railroad operations dispatcher for Fuller Yard
- T. J. Miller as Gilleece, Dewey's conductor
- Jessy Schram as Darcy Colson, Will's estranged wife
- David Warshofsky as Judd Stewart, a veteran engineer and Frank's friend

In addition, Elizabeth Mathis and Meagan Tandy portray Frank's daughters, who work as waitresses at Hooters.

== Production ==
=== Development ===
Unstoppable suffered various production challenges before filming could commence, including casting, schedule, location, and budgetary concerns.

In August 2004, Mark Bomback was hired by 20th Century Fox to write the screenplay Runaway Train. Robert Schwentke signed on to direct Runaway Train in August 2005, with plans to begin shooting in early 2006. In June 2007, Martin Campbell was in negotiations to replace Schwentke as director of the film, now titled Unstoppable. Campbell was attached until March 2009, when Tony Scott came on board as director. In April, both Denzel Washington and Chris Pine were attached to the project.

The original budget had been trimmed from $107 million to $100 million, but Fox wanted to reduce it to the low $90 million range, asking Scott to cut his salary from $9 million to $6 million and wanting Washington to shave $4 million off his $20 million fee. Washington declined and, although attached since April, formally withdrew from the project in July, citing lost patience with the film's lack of a start date. Fox made a modified offer as enticement, and he returned to the project two weeks later.

=== Filming ===
Production was headquartered in Pittsburgh, Pennsylvania, where the fictional "Allegheny and West Virginia Railroad" depicted in the movie is headquartered. Filming took place in a broad area around there including the Ohio cities of Martins Ferry, Bellaire, Mingo Junction, Steubenville, and Brewster, and in the Pennsylvania communities of Pittsburgh, Emporium, Milesburg, Tyrone, Julian, Unionville, Port Matilda, Bradford, Monaca, Eldred, Mill Hall, Turtlepoint, Pleasant Gap, Port Allegany, and Carnegie, and also in Portville, New York and Olean, New York. The film was the most expensive ever shot in Western Pennsylvania until The Dark Knight Rises.

The Western New York and Pennsylvania Railroad's Buffalo Line was used for two months during daylight, while the railroad ran its regular freight service at night. The real-life bridge and elevated curve in the climactic scene is the B & O Railroad Viaduct between Bellaire, Ohio and Benwood, West Virginia.

A two-day filming session took place at the Hooters restaurant in Wilkins Township, a Pittsburgh suburb, featuring 10 Hooters Girls from across the United States. Other interior scenes were shot at 31st Street Studios (then the Mogul Media Studios) on 31st Street in Pittsburgh. Principal photography began on August 31, 2009, for a release on November 12, 2010.

Filming was delayed for one day when part of the train accidentally derailed on November 21, 2009.

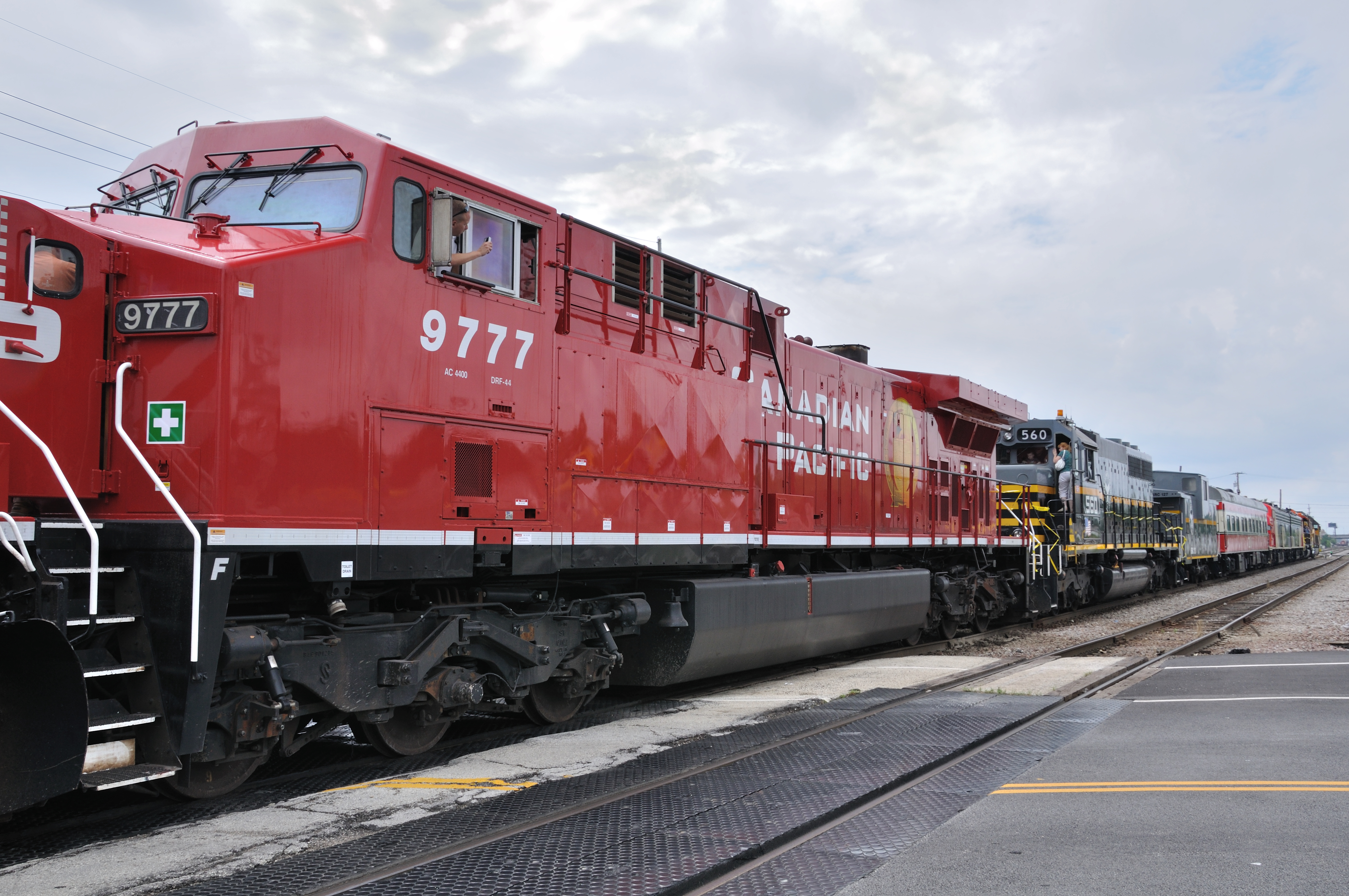
CP #9777, a GE AC4400CW locomotive, was used to film early scenes. Photographed in 2010 after the locomotive was repainted.

=== Locomotives ===
The locomotives used in the movie were borrowed from three railroads: the Canadian Pacific Railway (CP), the Wheeling and Lake Erie Railway (W&LE), and the Southwest Pennsylvania Railroad (SWP).

Four GE AC4400CWs leased from CP were used to depict the locomotives used on the runaway train, 777 and trailing unit 767. CP 9777 and 9758 played 777 and 767 in early scenes, and CP 9782 and 9751 were given a damaged look for later scenes (777's crushed front railings, and 767's shattered engineer windshield). These four locomotives were repainted to standard colors in early 2010 by Canadian Pacific following the filming, but the black and yellow warning stripes from the AWVR livery painted on the plows of each locomotive were left untouched (except for 9777's plow) and remained visible on the locomotives.

Most of the other AWVR locomotives seen in the film, including chase locomotive 1206, and the locomotive consist used in an attempt to stop the train, 7375 and 7346, were played by EMD SD40-2s leased from W&LE. 1206 was depicted by three different SD40-2s: W&LE 6353 and 6354, and a third unit that was bought from scrap and modified for cab shots. 6353 and 6354 were returned to the W&LE and painted black to resume service, but 6354's windshield remains jutted forward from the AWVR livery. Judd Stewart's locomotive consist 7375 and 7346 were played by W&LE 6352 and 6351, which also played two locomotive "extras" (5624 and 5580), wearing the same grey livery with different running numbers. The Railroad Safety Campaign excursion train locomotive (RSC 2002) was played by a SWP EMD GP11 rebuilt from an EMD GP9. The two passenger coaches carrying schoolchildren were provided by the Orrville Railroad Heritage Society in Orrville, Ohio.

Locomotive type	Real life owner	Real life numberboards	Featured
GE AC4400CW	CP	CP 9777 & 9782	AWVR 777
GE AC4400CW	CP	CP 9758 & 9751	AWVR 767
EMD SD40-2	W&LE	W&LE 6353 & 6354	AWVR 9705 & 1206
EMD SD40-2	W&LE	W&LE 6352	AWVR 7375, 5624, & 6032
EMD SD40-2	W&LE	W&LE 6351	AWVR 7346, 5607, & 5580
EMD GP11	SWP	SWP 2002	RSC 2002

== Inspiration ==
Unstoppable was inspired by the 2001 CSX 8888 incident, in which a runaway train ultimately traveled 66 miles (106 km) through northwest Ohio. Led by CSX Transportation SD40-2 #8888, the train left Stanley Yard in Walbridge, Ohio with no one at the controls, after the driver got out of the slow-moving train to correct a misaligned switch, mistakenly believing he had properly set the train's dynamic braking system, much as his counterpart (Dewey) in the film mistakenly believed he had properly set the locomotive's throttle (in the CSX incident, the locomotive had an older-style throttle stand where the same lever controlled both the throttle and the dynamic brakes; in fact, putting on "full throttle" and "full brakes" both involved advancing the same lever to the highest position after switching to a different operating mode. Thus if the engineer failed to properly switch modes, it was easy to accidentally apply full throttle instead of full brake, or vice-versa).

Two of the train's tank cars contained thousands of gallons of molten phenol, a toxic ingredient used in glues, paints, and dyes. The chemical is very dangerous; it is highly corrosive to the skin, eyes, lungs, and nasal tract. Attempts to derail it using a portable derailer failed, and police had tried to engage the red fuel cutoff button by shooting at it; after having three shots mistakenly hit the red fuel cap, this ultimately had no effect because the button must be pressed for several seconds before the engine would be starved of fuel and shut down. For two hours, the train traveled at speeds up to 51 miles per hour (82 km/h) until the crew of a second locomotive, CSX #8392, coupled onto the runaway and slowly applied its brakes. Once the runaway was slowed down to 11 miles per hour (18 km/h), CSX trainmaster Jon Hosfeld ran alongside the train, and climbed aboard, shutting down the locomotive. The train was stopped at the Ohio State Route 31 crossing, just south-southeast of Kenton, Ohio. No one was seriously injured in the incident.

RSC 2002 was inspired by a CSX Operation Lifesaver passenger train, which was turning around at Stanley Yard and was preparing to head back south after having traveled north from Columbus to Walbridge using the same track CSX 8888 was now on. CSX ended up having to bus the safety train's 120 passengers back to the cities at which they had boarded, including Bowling Green, Findlay, and Kenton.

When the film was released, the Toledo Blade compared the events of the film to the real-life incident. "It's predictably exaggerated and dramatized to make it more entertaining," wrote David Patch, "but close enough to the real thing to support the 'Inspired by True Events' announcement that flashes across the screen at its start." He notes that the dead man switch would probably have worked in real life despite the unconnected brake hoses, unless the locomotive, or independent brakes, were already applied. As explained in the movie, the dead man's switch failed because the only available brakes were the independent brakes, which were quickly worn through, similar to CSX 8888. The film exaggerates the possible damage the phenol could have caused in a fire, and he found it incredible that the fictional AWVR freely disseminated information such as employees' names and images and the cause of the runaway to the media. In the real instance, he writes, the cause of the runaway was not disclosed until months later when the National Transportation Safety Board released its report, and CSX never made public the name of the engineer whose error caused the runaway, nor what disciplinary action was taken.

== Soundtrack ==
The film score was composed by Harry Gregson-Williams and the soundtrack album was released on December 7, 2010.

== Release ==
Unstoppable premiered at the Regency Village Theatre in Westwood, Los Angeles, on October 26, 2010. It was released in theaters in the United States on November 12, 2010.

=== Marketing ===
A trailer was released online on August 6, 2010. The film went on general release on November 12, 2010.

=== Home media ===
Unstoppable was released on DVD and Blu-ray on February 15, 2011, by 20th Century Fox Home Entertainment.

== Reception ==
=== Critical response ===
==== General ====
On Rotten Tomatoes the film holds an approval rating of 87% based on 195 reviews, with an average rating of 6.9/10. The site's critical consensus reads, "As fast, loud, and relentless as the train at the center of the story, Unstoppable is perfect popcorn entertainment—and director Tony Scott's best movie in years." Metacritic gives the film a weighted average score of 69 out of 100, based on 34 critics, indicating "generally favorable reviews". Audiences surveyed by CinemaScore gave the film an average grade of "A-" on an A+ to F scale.

Film critic Roger Ebert rated the film three and a half out of four, remarking in his review, "In terms of sheer craftsmanship, this is a superb film." Vanity Fair summed it up as "a surprisingly well-made action movie," but quickly forgettable.

Rolling Stone's Peter Travers—despite a confessed initial skepticism, and giving it only three stars—found that "Your head will spin... palms will sweat... nerves will fry," calling the film "a bang-up ride that [will] wring you out."

Midwest Film Journal reviewer Nick Rogers concurs: "a terrific thrill ride" and "nail-biting fun," with "sobering steel-city woes... blue-collar anxiety," uplifted with "can-do optimism and work ethic."

The Globe and Mail in Toronto was more measured. While the film's action scenes "have the greasy punch of a three-minute heavy-metal guitar solo", its critic felt the characters were weak. It called the film "an opportunistic political allegory about an economy that's out of control and industries that are weakened by layoffs, under-staffing, and corporate callousness."

The New York Times' Manohla Dargis dismissed it as "largely forgettable," with "transitory... pleasures, limited to the actors... and... moments of beauty [or] strange comedy." But it credits "cinematographer Ben Seresin and... ace sound technicians" for creating "an unexpectedly rich world" of trains and landscapes. The reviewer ridicules the movie scene of a cop shooting at the train, trying to "hit an emergency stop button," as "a ridiculous image, openly laughable... [an] outrageous, excessive [director's] flourish"—apparently unaware it actually happened in the real-life CSX 8888 incident.

But another Times reviewer, A.O. Scott, said "the charm of this movie... is its simplicity," focused on "an engineering problem... solved at top speed... by... a handful of professionals"—calling the film's "absorption in practical matters... exhilarating"—praising its absence of "subtext... larger meaning... political implications or psychological mystery."

Director Quentin Tarantino highlighted the film in a January 2020 episode of the Rewatchables podcast, and included it in his list of the ten best of the decade. In June 2021, he named it one of his favorite "Director's Final Films". Christopher Nolan also praised the film (particularly its use of suspense), citing it as an influence for his film Dunkirk.

==== Railroad media ====
The editor of railroad industry journal Railway Age — having only read press releases and previewed the movie trailer — panned it as having "...stretched the truth for dramatic effect... [to produce] an entertaining diversion from reality... highly exaggerated."

Trains magazine's reviewer says the film is "not a train movie;... It’s an action movie..." that "delivers" as "visceral action entertainment"—not "railroad propaganda." However, the review credits the film for depicting "most... working-day railroaders [as] safety-conscious...," trying to do "the right thing," adding "the railroad atmosphere is abundant," with "terminology [that] rings true," despite the "improbable" story. The review acknowledges several similarities between the film and the real-life runaway CSX 8888 event, but notes the film is full of Hollywood exaggerations and clichés. The review reports that the film uses special effects only "sparingly," emphasizing "those are real [locomotives] being raced, blown up,... reined in."

=== Box office ===
Upon its debut, Unstoppable promptly took the box-office lead in 40 countries around the world, with an $18.2 million opening weekend—premiering as the most successful film that weekend in China, Taiwan, Hong Kong and Malaysia—coming in second in North America and Germany.

Unstoppable was expected to take in about the same amount of money as the previous year's The Taking of Pelham 123, another Tony Scott film involving an out-of-control train starring Denzel Washington. Pelham took in $23.4 million during its opening weekend in the United States and Canada. Unstoppable had a strong opening night on Friday November 12, 2010, coming in ahead of Megamind with a gross of $8.1 million. However, Megamind won the weekend, earning $30 million to Unstoppable's $23.9 million. Unstoppable performed slightly better than The Taking of Pelham 123 did in its opening weekend. As of April 2011, the film had earned $167,805,466 worldwide.

=== Awards ===
Unstoppable was nominated for Best Action Movie at the 2011 Critics' Choice Movie Awards, but lost to Inception. It was also nominated for Teen Choice Award for Choice Movie – Action.

The film was nominated in the Best Sound Editing (Mark Stoeckinger) category at the 83rd Academy Awards, but lost. However, it won in that category in the 2010 Satellite Awards, where it was also nominated for best cinematography, visual effects, film editing, and original score.

== See also ==
- Atomic Train
- Narrow Margin
- Runaway Train
- The Bullet Train (1975) Japanese disaster film
- The Burning Train (1980) Indian film
- Silver Streak
