= Galley Run =

Stream in Pennsylvania, USA

Galley Run Tributary to Youghiogheny River
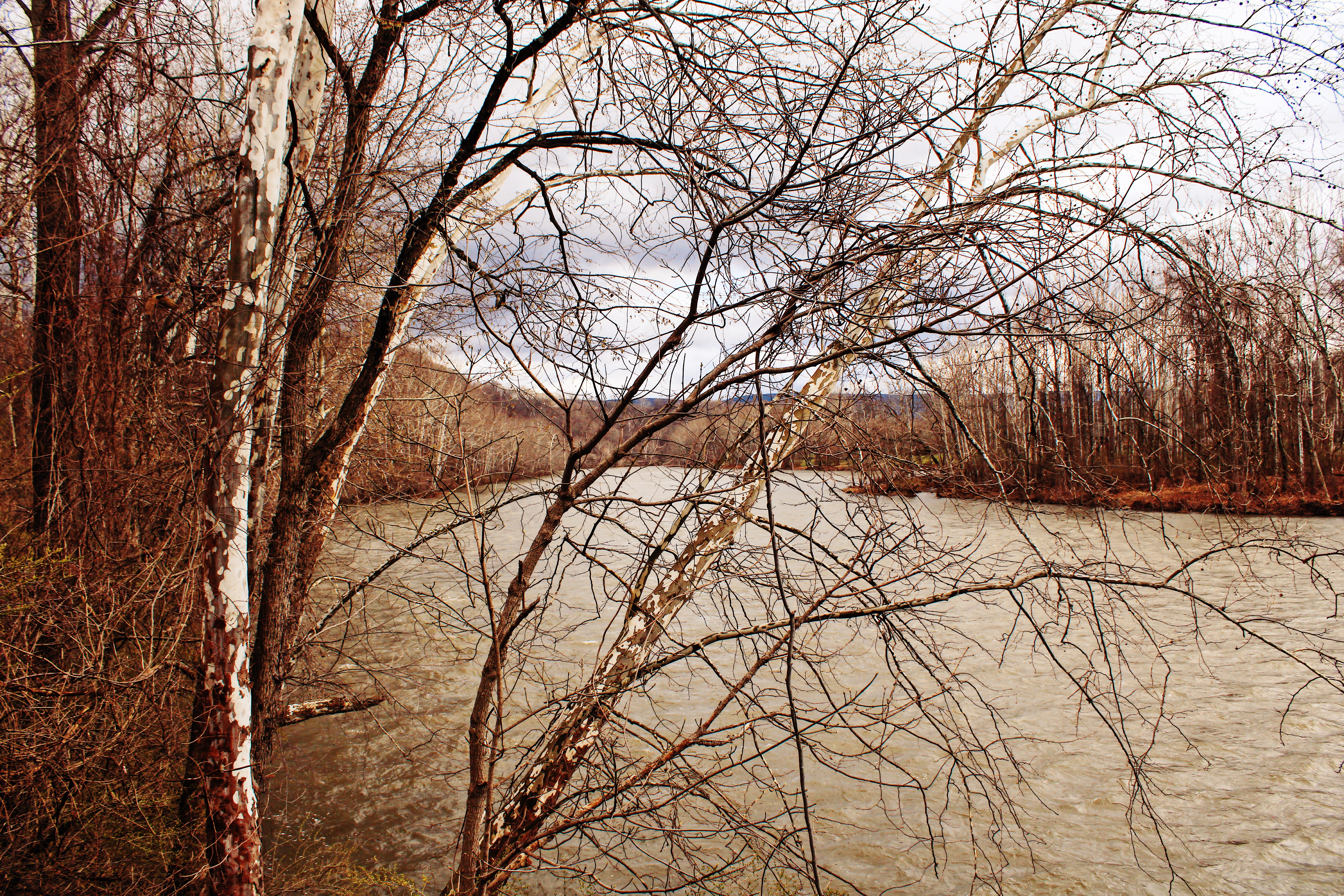
- Galley Run in 2026

- Location of Galley Run mouth Galley Run (the United States)

Location
- Country: United States
- State: Pennsylvania
- County: Fayette

Physical characteristics
- Source: Jacobs Creek divide
  - location: about 0.5 miles west of Owensdale, Pennsylvania
  - coordinates: 40°04′48″N 079°37′08″W
  - elevation: 1,075 ft (328 m)
- Mouth: Youghiogheny River
  - location: Broad Ford, Pennsylvania
  - coordinates: 40°02′49″N 079°36′42″W
  - elevation: 852 ft (260 m)
- Length: 2.91 mi (4.68 km)
- Basin size: 3.51 square miles (9.1 km^{2})
- Discharge
  - location: Youghiogheny River
  - average: 4.85 cu ft/s (0.137 m^{3}/s) at mouth with Youghiogheny River

Basin features
- Progression: generally south
- River system: Monongahela River
- Tributaries
  - left: unnamed tributaries
  - right: unnamed tributaries
- Bridges: Rush Drive, Kings Road (x2), Marchewka Lane, Dry Hill Road, Broadford Road (x2)

Galley Run is a 2.91 mi (4.68 km) long 2nd order tributary to the Youghiogheny River in Fayette County, Pennsylvania. This is the only stream of this name in the United States.

== Course ==
Galley Run rises about 0.5 miles west of Owensdale, Pennsylvania, and then flows south to join the Youghiogheny River at Broad Ford.

== Watershed ==
Galley Run drains 3.51 square miles (9.1 km^{2}) of area, receives about 42.3 in/year of precipitation, has a wetness index of 364.53, and is about 40% forested.
