= ABCR =

ABCR can refer to:

- Akron Barberton Cluster Railway
- The ABCA4/ABCR gene implicated in some age-related macular degeneration
