= County of Nether Tyrone =

County of Ireland

The County of Nether Tyrone was a historic county of Ireland located in the northwest of the country. It was merged with Upper Tyrone to form County Tyrone.
