= RIP track =

Parking track for minor train repairs

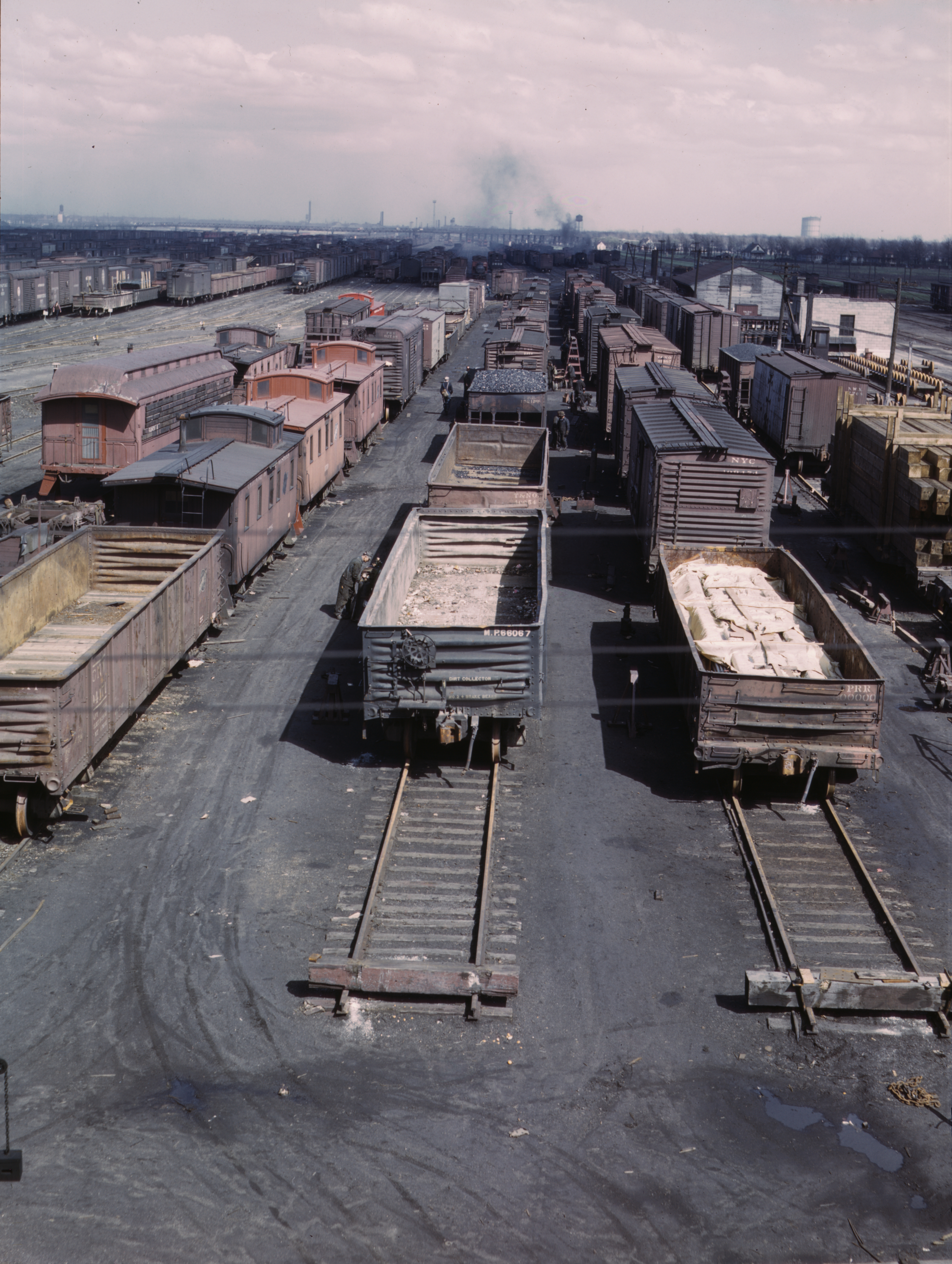
General view of part of the rip tracks at the Chicago and North Western Transportation Company Proviso Yard, Chicago, Ill. April 1943

A RIP track, short for repair in place track, (also known as a "cripple track" in slang terms) is a designated track, or tracks, in a rail yard or a siding along a section of a main rail line where locomotives and/or railroad cars can be placed for minor repairs. A RIP track allows for minor repairs to be done without removing the units from service and sometimes allows for these repairs to be done without removing a freight load from the car. In some yards, a RIP track may be used for staging locomotives or damaged cars for major repairs and some rail yards may have more than one RIP track to serve both functions.

== Usage ==
When it is discovered that an unloaded freight car requires repairs, they are normally sent to the repair shops. However, mechanical defects often do not show up, or are not discovered, until after a freight car has been loaded and is in transit. Obviously, it would be expensive and entail considerable delay to have to unload a defective car and transfer the load onto another car before the cargo can continue its journey. Often the repairs required are of a minor nature and such as may be taken care of in a short time with the proper facilities without unloading a car. It is for the repair of loaded freight cars that a RIP track or RIP track operation is specifically provided.

As is well understood in railroading, loaded freight cars requiring repair before they can safely continue to destination, are removed from the train and delivered to the incoming side of a rip track which area is commonly referred to as the "bad order" area. From the bad order area the cars are moved into the middle portion of the rip track which is referred to as the "repair" area.

Seeing as most of the repairs have to do largely with the car trucks or under frame, jacks are used in the repair area for lifting the cars in various ways and locations. Therefore, these jacks can be easily moved alongside the track or tracks in the repair area. Once the cars have been repaired they are removed from the repair area into the discharge side of the rip track which is referred to as the "OK" area.

Switcher locomotives are used for delivering defective loaded cars to the RIP track and for removing them after they are repaired.

== Gallery ==
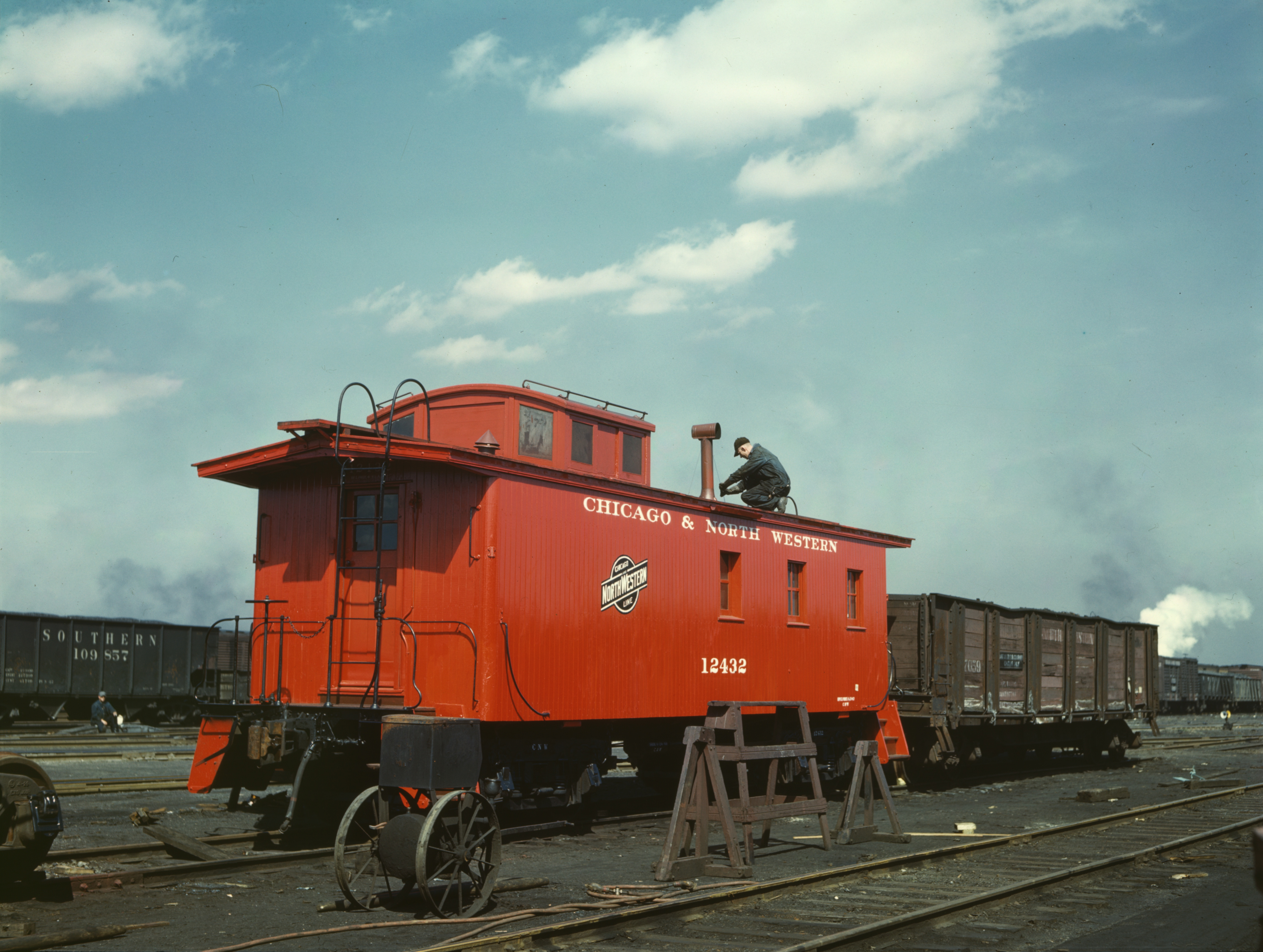
A railway worker putting the finishing touches on a rebuilt caboose on the RIP tracks at Proviso yard, Chicago

A boxcar being painted on the RIP tracks at Proviso yard, Chicago

A boxcar being jacked up for repairs on the RIP tracks at Proviso yard, Chicago

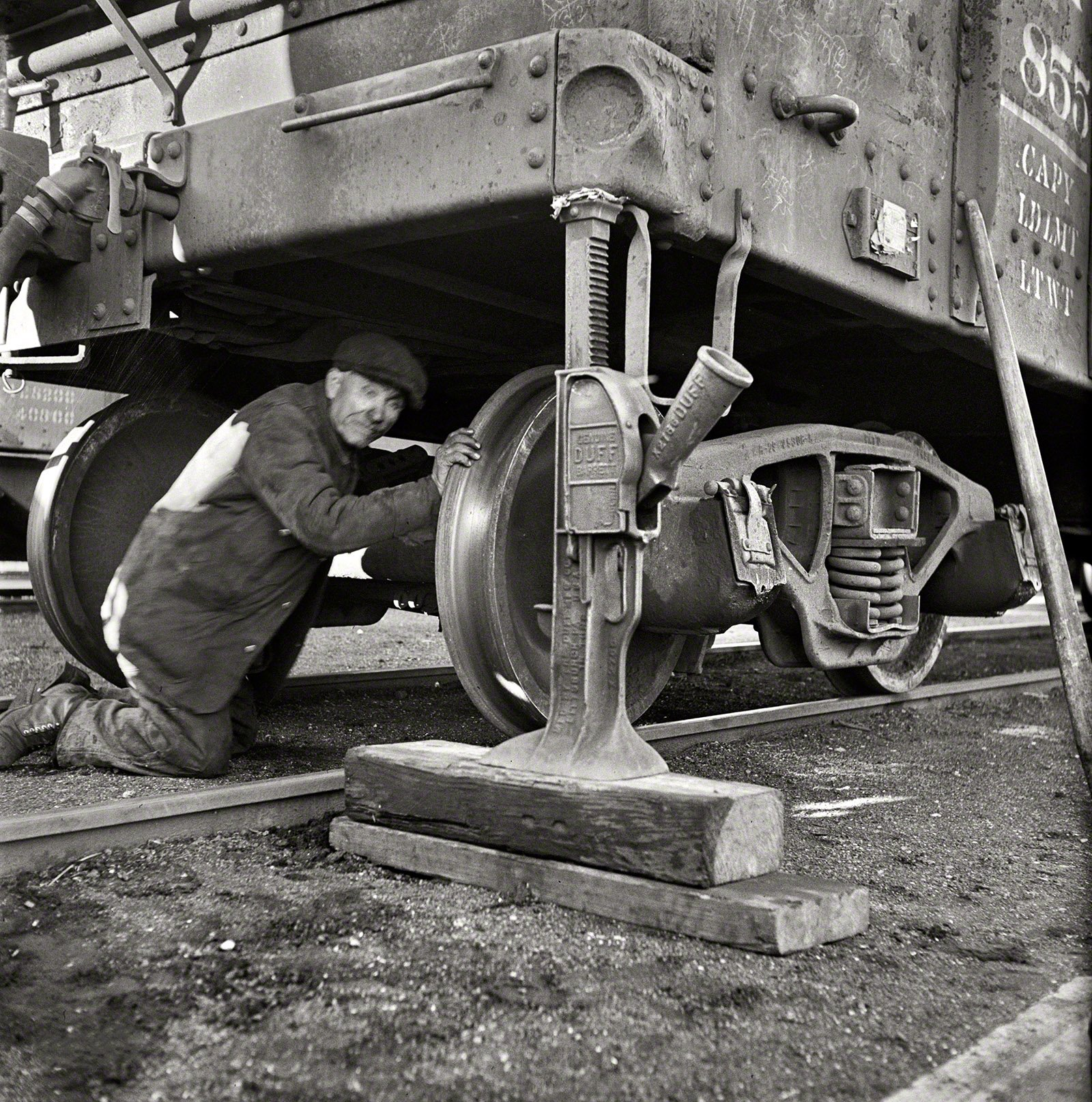
A railroad employee jacking up a gondola car to swap out a truck

== In popular culture ==
A RIP track is featured in the 2010 action-thriller film Unstoppable. In the film the protagonists and their locomotive use a RIP track to avoid a head-on collision with 777, the film's runaway locomotive, after being unable to fit into an earlier siding due to the length of their train.
