= Curtis H. Gregg =

American politician

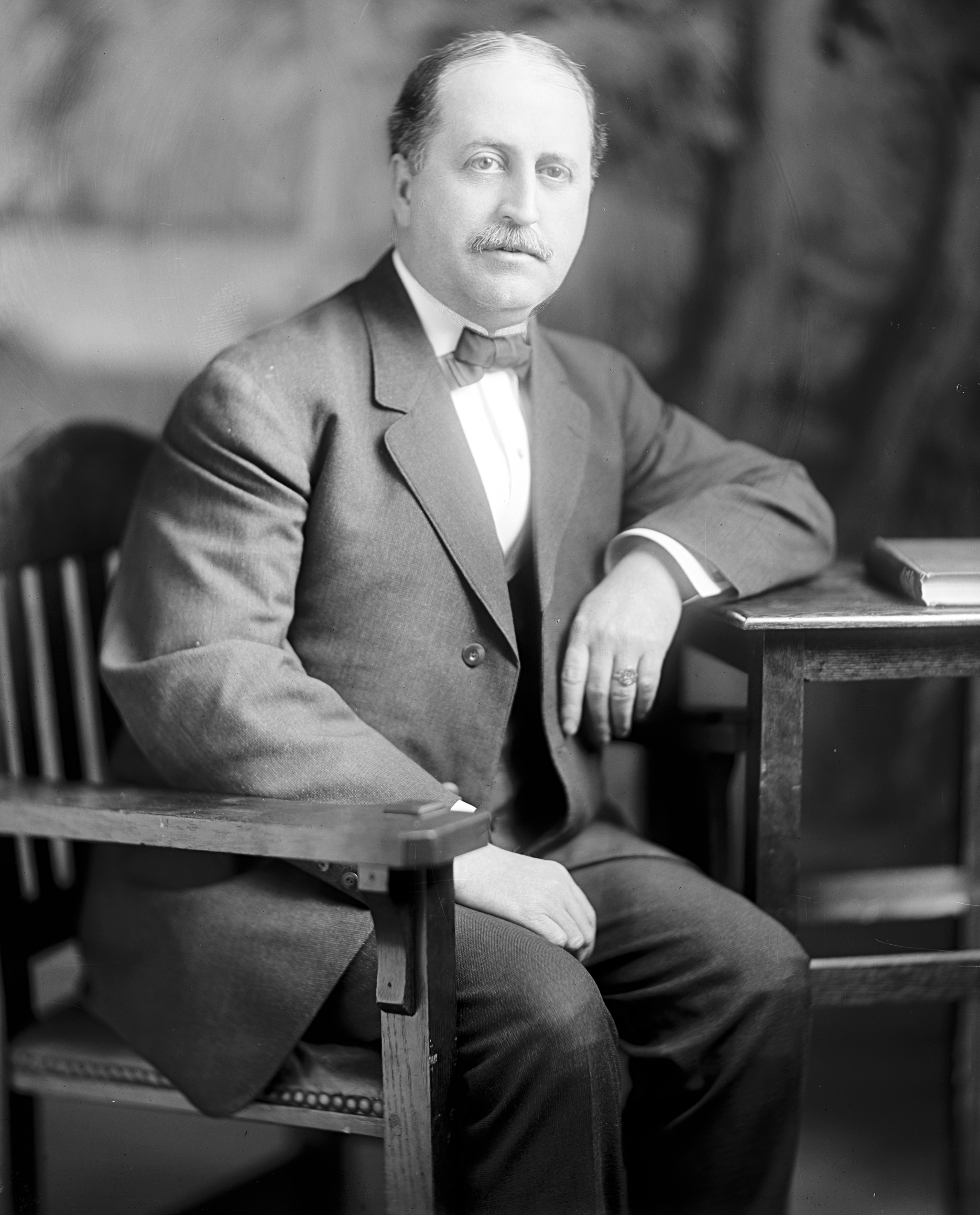
- Harris & Ewing photo, circa 1911

Member of the U.S. House of Representatives from Pennsylvania's 22nd district
- In office March 4, 1911 – March 3, 1913
- Preceded by: George Franklin Huff
- Succeeded by: Abraham Lincoln Keister

Personal details
- Born: August 9, 1865 Adamsburg, Pennsylvania, US
- Died: January 18, 1933 (aged 67) Greensburg, Pennsylvania, US
- Party: Democratic

Curtis H. Gregg (August 9, 1865 – January 18, 1933) was a Democratic member of the U.S. House of Representatives from Pennsylvania.

== Biography ==
Curtis H. Gregg was born in Adamsburg, Pennsylvania. He attended Greensburg Seminary in Greensburg, Pennsylvania. He was engaged in teaching and worked as associate editor of the Greensburg Evening Press from 1883 to 1887.

He studied law, was admitted to the bar in 1888, and commenced practice in Greensburg. He served as district attorney of Westmoreland County, Pennsylvania in 1891. He was a member of the school board of Greensburg from 1892 to 1896. He was a delegate to the Democratic State conventions in 1892, 1894, and 1896, and served as chairman of the Democratic county committee from 1896 to 1913.

He was an unsuccessful candidate in 1900 for election to the Fifty-seventh Congress and in 1904 for election to the Pennsylvania State Senate. He was a member of the council of the borough of Greensburg from 1901 to 1905. He was a delegate to the Democratic National Conventions in 1908, 1928, and 1932.

Gregg was elected as a Democrat to the Sixty-second Congress. He was an unsuccessful candidate for renomination in 1912. He became reengaged in the practice of law at Greensburg, until his death there in 1933, aged 67; he was interred in St. Clair Cemetery.

== Sources ==
- United States Congress. "Curtis H. Gregg (id: G000443)". Biographical Directory of the United States Congress.
- Curtis Hussey Gregg at The Political Graveyard

U.S. House of Representatives
Preceded by George F. Huff	Member of the U.S. House of Representatives from Pennsylvania's 22nd congressional district 1911–1913	Succeeded by Abraham L. Keister
