= Wheeling and Lake Erie Railway =

Wheeling and Lake Erie Railway may refer to:

- Wheeling and Lake Erie Railway (1990), a regional railroad
- Wheeling and Lake Erie Railway (1916–1988), leased to the Nickel Plate Road in 1949 and merged into the Norfolk and Western Railway in 1988
  - Its predecessors:
  - Wheeling and Lake Erie Railroad (1899–1916)
  - Wheeling and Lake Erie Railway (1886–1899)
  - Wheeling and Lake Erie Railroad (1871–1886)
