= Wheeling and Lake Erie Railway (1990) =

Railroad in the United States

- Map
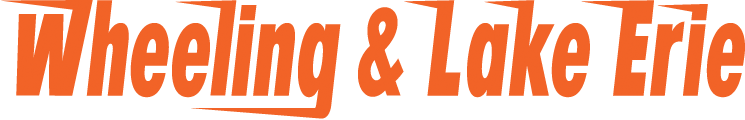

Overview
- Headquarters: Brewster, Ohio
- Reporting mark: WE
- Locale: Ohio, Pennsylvania, Maryland, West Virginia
- Dates of operation: 1990–Present
- Predecessor: Norfolk and Western Railway

Technical
- Track gauge: 4 ft 8 1/2 in (1,435 mm) standard gauge
- Length: Owned: 575 miles (925 km); Rights: 265 miles (426 km) Full Trackage Miles: 840 miles (1,350 km)

Other
- Website: www.wlerwy.com

The Wheeling and Lake Erie Railway (reporting mark WE) is a Class II regional railroad that provides freight service, mainly in the areas of Northern Ohio and Western Pennsylvania. It took its name from the former Wheeling and Lake Erie Railway, most of which it bought from the Norfolk and Western Railway in 1990.

== The first W&LE and History (pre-1990) ==
=== Original Wheeling and Lake Erie Railway (1880-1949) ===
The Wheeling and Lake Erie Railway (1916–1988) Railroad began standard gauge operations under investor Jay Gould in 1880. Its mainline ran from Wheeling to Zanesville to Cleveland, and it ran freight and passenger trains primarily between those cities. It eventually completed a route connecting Pittsburgh, PA (Rook) and Toledo, Ohio. Most freight traffic on the line was coal and iron ore, with general merchandise also making up a significant portion. Passenger service ended in 1940 just before the start of World War II. Brewster begin serving as headquarters of the Wheeling and Lake Erie Railway in 1914. Service from Huron to Massillion, Ohio was opened on January 9, 1882 and new lines were constructed that eventually reached the Ohio River and Toledo. The WLE also developed new docks on Lake Erie at Huron that opened May 21, 1884 when the first cargo of iron ore was received. In 1880 another 3-foot narrow gauge line, the Connotton Valley Railway, was formed; building north from Canton, Ohio to Cleveland and then south to Coshocton, Ohio and Zanesville. The Connotton Valley became the Cleveland, Canton & Southern Railroad and was converted to standard gauge in one day on November 18, 1888. The Cleveland, Canton & Southern Railroad joined the WLE in 1899 after its purchase at a foreclosure sale, becoming WLE's Cleveland Division. At its height, the WLE ran from the Pittsburgh region (through a connection with the Wabash-Pittsburgh Terminal, later the Pittsburgh and West Virginia Railway) to Lake Erie at Huron and Toledo. However, the mainlines of the WLE never reached outside Ohio's borders. It also ran from Cleveland to Zanesville, with the lines crossing at Harmon, just east of Brewster, Ohio, which became the location of WLE's corporate headquarters and locomotive shops. With two busy main stems crossing on the map of Ohio; the road's nickname for many years was "The Iron Cross." Ironically, the mainline of the WLE never actually reached Wheeling, West Virginia. However, a branch between Steubenville, Ohio and Martins Ferry was completed in 1891, which led to an indirect connection to Wheeling via a subsidiary, the Wheeling Bridge and Terminal Company. The WLE began producing locomotives at its Brewster, Ohio shops in 1910, and boasted one of the finest locomotive producing facilities in the country. Over the years, the WLE built and rolled boilers and erected fifty of their own steam engines, a feat never tried by many larger and more famous railroads. The Wheeling & Lake Erie was jokingly called the "Wailing and Leg Weary" but, after several early financial embarrassments, finally found prosperity in its later life.

=== Nickel Plate Road, Norfolk and Western, and Norfolk Southern (1949-1990) ===
In 1949, the New York, Chicago, & St. Louis Railroad, or Nickel Plate Road (NKP) as it was known, leased the W&LE. The W&LE was operated as the "Wheeling and Lake Erie District" of the NKP. In 1964, the Nickel Plate combined with the Norfolk and Western Railway (N&W), bringing the W&LE into N&W and, after the N&W-Southern Railway merger, Norfolk Southern. Throughout this period, the railroad generally remained unchanged. The railroad was combined into Norfolk Southern in 1988, ending its existence as a separate subsidiary.

== The new W&LE (1990-Present) ==
=== Establishment and Acquisition ===
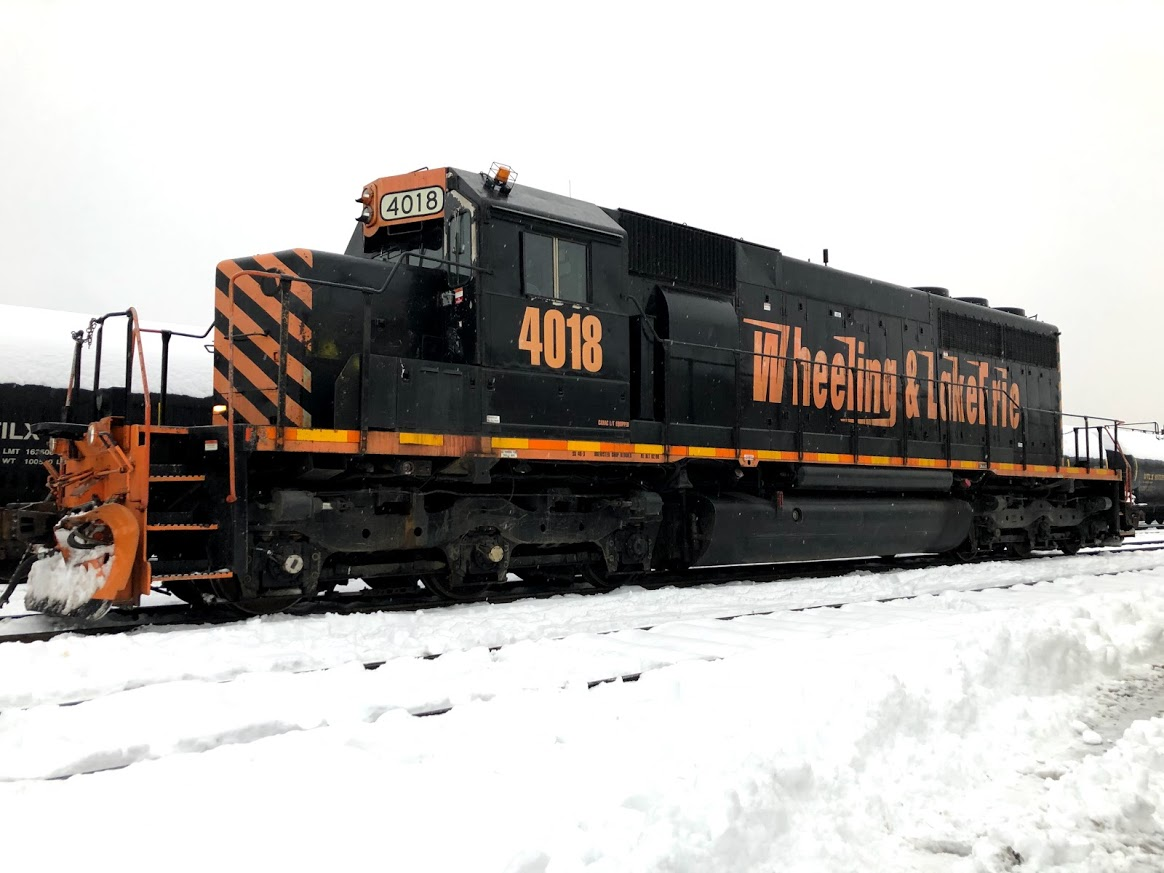
W&LE 4018

In 1990, Norfolk Southern sold some of its lines in Ohio and Pennsylvania. The sale included most of the former W&LE and the Akron, Canton and Youngstown Railroad, as well as a lease on the Pittsburgh and West Virginia Railroad. The Wheeling Acquisition Corporation was created by a group of private investors to take ownership of a large portion of the sale. The company was renamed the "Wheeling and Lake Erie Railway" on May 1, 1990, before operations began.

In 1994, W&LE purchased the former Akron and Barberton Belt Railroad and part of the Conrail “Cluster” railroads in the Akron, Ohio area. The two railroads were combined into the Akron Barberton Cluster Railway, which operates as a subsidiary of W&LE.

With the purchase, the W&LE also acquired some locomotives and rolling stock from Norfolk Southern.

In August 2025, it was announced that the W&LE would be sold to FTAI Infrastructure, Inc., and will be a part of FTAI’s Transtar if approved by the Surface Transportation Board. The W&LE's brand will remain the same. The board approved the acquisition into the Fortress Investment Group's Transtar portfolio in November.

== Routing and Trackage Rights ==
=== Trackage Rights ===
At its formation, trackage rights on Norfolk Southern were extended to the new organization to serve several limestone quarries in the Bellevue, Ohio area. Trackage rights were also obtained over CSX Transportation from Connellsville, Pennsylvania to Hagerstown, Maryland. These rights are a remnant of the 1950s Alphabet Route of which the original W&LE was a part. W&LE also maintains trackage rights from Wellington to Berea on CSX, then from Berea to the Cleveland Flats on Norfolk Southern.

In the sale, the W&LE acquired the Huron Branch (an original W&LE route), a line between Norwalk and the Huron docks, but the line was never activated north of the Norwalk city limits, and was later removed in its entirety. Until 2019, W&LE served the Huron Docks using trackage rights on NS's former Nickel Plate Road mainline (now the NS Cleveland District) from Bellevue using a connecting line to the docks built by the NKP in 1952. The trackage rights expired in 2019, and W&LE ceased operations to Huron.

W&LE also has trackage rights to Lima, Ohio, that originally used CSX lines from Carey to Upper Sandusky to Lima, but after the lease of the CSX line (the former Pennsylvania Railroad Fort Wayne Line) by RailAmerica's Chicago, Fort Wayne and Eastern Railroad, W&LE now uses trackage rights from its lines at New London to Crestline, Ohio on CSX, then west on the CF&E to Lima. These trackage rights were also a result of the Conrail split.

=== W&LE Routes ===
Branch lines reach as far south as Benwood, West Virginia (just south of Wheeling) and as far east as Connellsville, Pennsylvania. The W&LE joins the Southwest Pennsylvania Railroad at Owensdale, Pennsylvania. The W&LE currently owns 575 miles (925 km) of track and retains trackage rights on another 265 miles (426 km), totaling to 840 miles (1350km).

==== Brewster Subdivision ====
The Brewster Subdivision runs 40 miles through the fields of Medina, Wayne and Stark Counties in northeastern Ohio. It sees the largest amount of traffic of any Wheeling and Lake Erie Subdivision. The west end of the line is in Spencer, Ohio at the diamond where the Akron, Brewster, Carey and Hartland Subdivisions all meet. Spencer is regarded as the crossroads of the Wheeling & Lake Erie.

In the 1970s, under Norfolk & Western ownership, there were passing sidings every 10 miles. Those sidings had remotely-controlled switches and signals. The sidings and signals systems were removed shortly after W&LE took ownership of the route. Since this change, operations have been controlled with track warrants issued from the dispatcher in Brewster at the company headquarters building.

In 2010, The Wheeling & Lake Erie Railway had finished installation of a 6,900-foot siding at Creston to provide a badly needed place for trains to pass on the Brewster Subdivision between Brewster and Spencer. After the switches were installed, the adjacent right-of-way was cleared, and then ties, rails and ballast were installed. After the track machines left, the siding was placed in operation. It was used by trains traveling at restrictive speed to settle the new track. The track is 136-pound welded rail. The switch at the west end of the siding is at MP B108.76, just east of Brooklyn Street. The east switch is at MP B110.2 north of Sterling Road. The new siding will allow meets between eastbound and westbound trains on the Brewster subdivision (Spencer–Brewster). Trains had been passing at Orrville Junction, using the former W&LE mainline, now the Orrville secondary, a dead-end track. Use of that line requires heading in on lesser-weight rail and then backing out to the mainline after the meet. The new siding at Creston will eliminate that tedious move. The siding has radio controlled (DTMF) switches (and accompanying indicator signals). The switch positions are set by the DTMF tone generator from an approaching train. The indicator signals are "red" by default. This does not mean “stop” in the usual railroad parlance, it only means that the signal has not been activated by an approaching train. The signal aspect will go “green” for normal (straight through alignment) and “amber” for reverse (switch lined for the siding).

Continuing East past Creston, the Brewster sub passes through rural farmland into the villages of Smithville, Orrville, Dalton, and Kidron. Upon reaching Brewster, the Brewster Yardmaster controls the main track. Trains may enter or exit the west end of Brewster yard at a location called "Shorbs." Trains access the east end of Brewster yard at a location called "Baymere," also a DTMF controlled switch. Just east of Brewster, the Brewster Subdivision crosses RJ Corman at a diamond called "Justus". About a mile east of Justus, there is a switch called "Harmon," a DTMF controlled switch, which is the junction with the W&LE Cleveland Subdivision. Just east of Harmon, the Brewster Subdivision ends at Junction 138, where the Rook Subdivision begins.

=== W&LE Operations over Parallel Routes ===
Some other small portions of the original W&LE and AC&Y have been abandoned and/or replaced with trackage rights on parallel lines by W&LE. One of these instances occurs on the Carey Subdivision between Greenwich and New London, Ohio. W&LE uses trackage rights over CSX to move between the eastern and western portions of the Carey Subdivision. The partial-abandonment of the Carey Sub was done to remove two at-grade crossings between the CSX and W&LE Lines. A similar case is on the Rook Subdivision between Bowerston and Jewett, Ohio, where W&LE operates over the Ohio Central Railroad. This arrangement allowed the W&LE to remove approximately 12 miles (19 km) of their route, which paralleled the now-used Ohio Central Route.

=== Non-W&LE trackage operated by other railroads ===
There are several portions of the original W&LE operated by companies other than the current W&LE. West of Bellevue, Ohio, the now-NS Toledo District was not sold back to W&LE. Immediately after W&LE operations began, Norfolk Southern removed the at-grade crossing in Bellevue, which connected the current W&LE Hartland District to the current NS Toledo District. W&LE now has trackage rights to Toledo on this line, obtained after the Conrail split in 1999. W&LE uses these rights to interchange with Canadian National Railway. Another section is the former Cleveland Division south of Harmon (east of Brewster), which was sold to the Ohio Central Railroad by NS in 1988.

== Locomotive roster ==
The Wheeling and Lake Erie rosters second-generation locomotives built by EMD, and a good number of locomotives have been rebuilt over time for extended service and continue to operate as of June 2026.

Number	Year built	Status	Notes	Model
EMD GP35-3	100-112, 200	1964-1965	104 undergoing rebuild, remainder All in service.	All originally GP35s of Southern, Norfolk and Western and Central of Georgia heritage. Rebuilt by W&LE with EMD Dash 3 systems. Some retain high short hoods while others were rebuilt with low short hoods. #106 used to be numbered #2662 until late 2024 when it replaced the first #106 after it was scrapped in 2018 following a wreck. #200 wears an Ohio Bicentennial scheme.
EMD GP40-3	300-303, 701, 4005	1965-1971	All in service.	All originally GP40s of New York Central, Penn Central, Rio Grande and Rock Island heritage. Rebuilt by W&LE with EMD Dash 3 systems. #304 after it was scrapped in 2018 following a wreck. #701 was originally numbered #305 until being rebuilt and equipped with Positive Train Control in July 2020. #302 and #303 still retain DRGW lettering. #4005 in service with the Akron Barberton Cluster Railway.
EMD GP9R	4602	1957	In service.	Built as Central Vermont GP9 #4547, later went to the Grand Trunk Western with the same number. Rebuilt into GP9R in 1989 and renumbered to #4602. Arrived at W&LE in 2003.
EMD SD40-3	3016, 3034, 3046, 3048, 3049, 3067, 3068, 3073, 3102, 4000, 4001, 4003, 4016, 4018, 4025	1966-1971	3046, 3067, and 3102 stored, remainder in service.	All originally SD40s of Union Pacific, Grand Trunk Western, and Missouri Pacific heritage. #3046 was formerly an SD40X. Rebuilt by W&LE with EMD Dash 3 systems.
EMD SD40T-2	5411-5413	1978-1980	All in service.	#5411 was built for the Southern Pacific, while #5412 and #5413 were built for the DRGW and retain their lettering.
EMD SD40-2	1776, 6348, 6350, 6353, 6354, 6383, 6386, 6967, 6981-6997, 7001-7026	1966-1986	6981, 6983, 6993, 6997 stored, remainder in service.	All either original SD40s or SD40-2s of various heritages. Most rebuilt by W&LE, Alstom, National Railway Equipment and VMV Paducahbilt (an NREX subsidiary). #6353 and #6354 used as "AWVR #1206" in the 2010 film Unstoppable. #1776 was originally #6356 until being renumbered and repainted in red, white, and blue for the United States Semiquincentennial. #6348 still wears EMD Demonstrator colors. #7023 wears 30-Year commemorative W&LE Logos for the railroad's 30th Anniversary.
EMD SW1500	1501-1502	1966-1967	Both in service on Akron Barberton Cluster Railway.	Both of Conrail and ABB heritage.

== Traffic ==
Most traffic on the Wheeling and Lake Erie includes stone, farm products, chemicals, forest products, steel products, petroleum, paper, and other traffic. Wheeling and Lake Erie moves approximately 140,000 carloads annually.

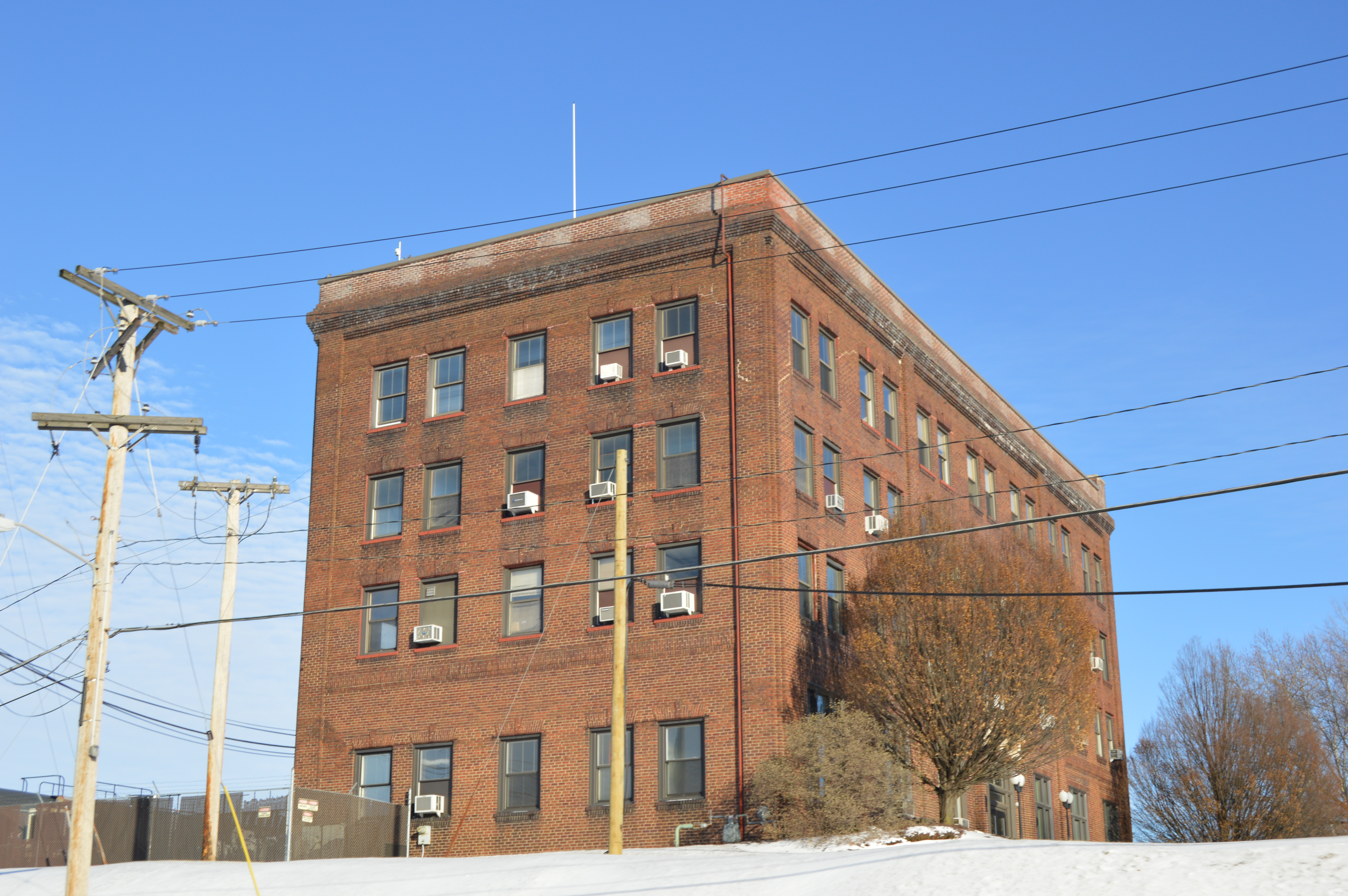
Wheeling and Lake Erie headquarters in Brewster. This was also the headquarters of the original W&LE.

Traffic on the Brewster Sub consists mostly of stone, liquified petroleum gas tankers, lumber cars and other miscellaneous cargo. The Carey Subdivisions primary cargo is stone coming and going from the National Lime and Stone Company Quarry in Carey which is the westernmost town on the wheeling line.

Preceded by Indiana Harbor Belt Railroad	Regional Railroad of the Year; 2004	Succeeded by Red River Valley and Western Railroad
Preceded by ArcelorMittal Infrastructure Canada (AMIC) Railway	Regional Railroad of the Year; 2024	Succeeded by Iowa Interstate Railroad
