= Akron Barberton Cluster Railway =

Railway line in Ohio

Overview
- Headquarters: Barberton, Ohio
- Reporting mark: AB
- Locale: Ohio
- Dates of operation: 1994–present

Technical
- Track gauge: 4 ft 8 1/2 in (1,435 mm) standard gauge

The Akron Barberton Cluster Railway (reporting mark AB) is a Class III railroad that operates on 73 miles (117 km) of track in and around Akron, Ohio.

== History ==
ABC Railway's beginnings trace back to the organization of the Akron and Barberton Belt Railroad (ABB) which was formed in 1902. ABB owned 62 miles (100 km) of track in and around Akron, Ohio.

By the 1980s, ABB's traffic had fallen due to a lack of business in the tire industry in Akron. In 1994, the new Wheeling and Lake Erie Railway (WE) purchased the ABB. After the ICC and W&LE signed an agreement and contract in 1993, W&LE made arrangements to form a new railroad in Akron using the former ABB as its basis.

In early 1994, WE created Akron Barberton Cluster Railway (ABCR) from the former ABB assets. It also included the former Erie main line from Barberton to Rittman and from Kent to Ravenna, Ohio sold by Conrail. In 1997, ABCR was granted permission to tear out 45% the former ABB "Loop" line which looped from the grade in Barberton and Firestone Park to the WE's Brittain Yard in Akron. In 1999, ABCR took the line out of service, and in 2001, they tore the line out completely with expenses paid off by parent railroad company, WE.

The Surface Transportation Board approved the acquisition of the line into the Fortress Investment Group's Transtar portfolio in November 2025.

== Current system ==
ABCR has trackage rights on CSX's New Castle Subdivision from the yard in Akron south to Barberton, where it swings off around their headquarters area. ABCR is headquartered in a small building off a local road in Barberton, Ohio. ABCR uses the restored Erie Railroad line from Barberton to Rittman, Ohio.

In 2002, the railroad acquired the line to the General Electric factory in northern Ravenna, Ohio. ABCR has purchased trackage rights with METRO Regional Transit Authority in 2006, to connect to the Canton area.
