= County of Upper Tyrone =

Historic county of Ireland

The County of Upper Tyrone, was a historic county of Ireland located in the northwest of the country. It was merged with Nether Tyrone to form County Tyrone.
