= Broadford, Pennsylvania =

Unincorporated community in Pennsylvania, US

Coordinates: 40°2′51.5″N 79°36′30.7″W

- Unincorporated community
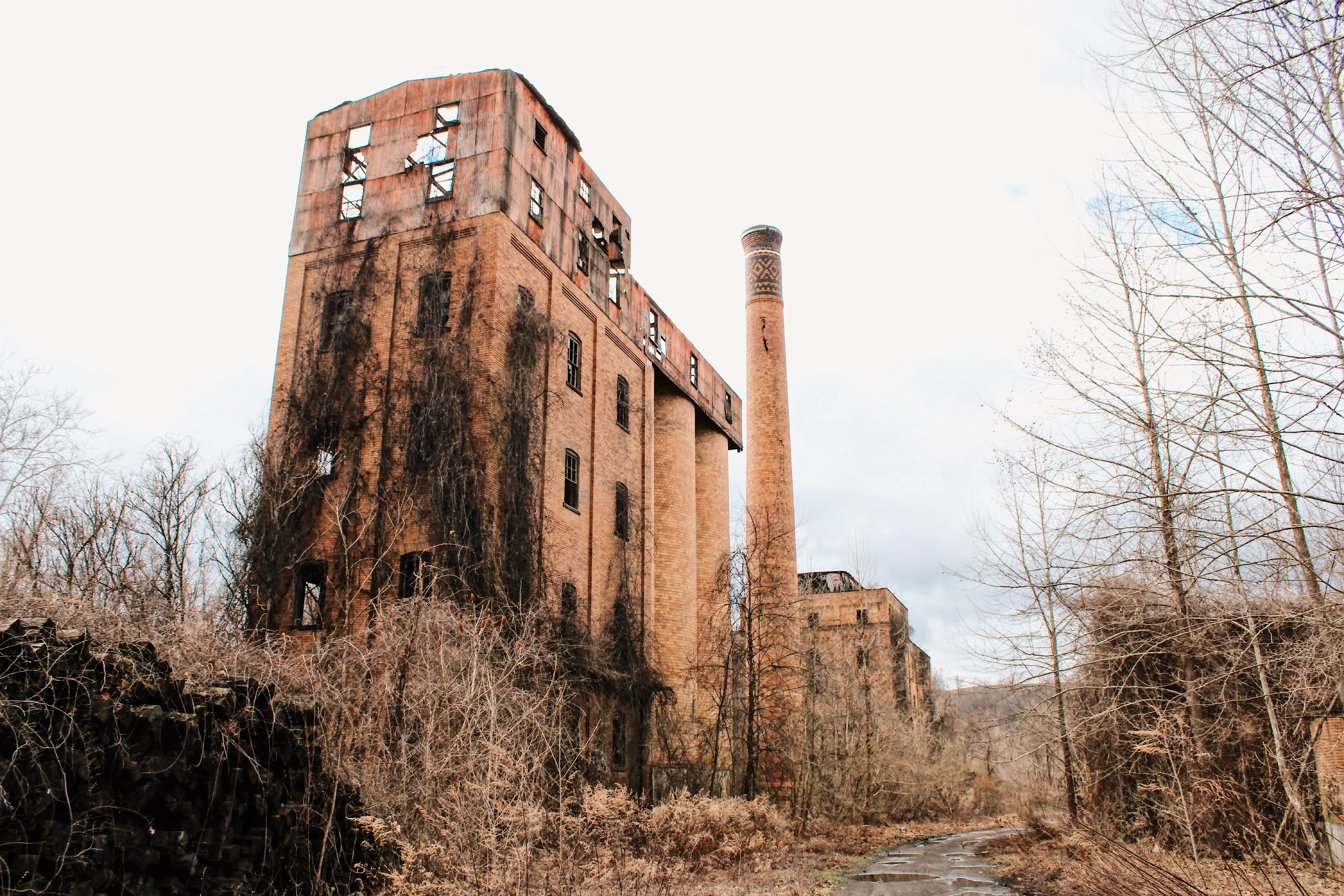
- Former distillery building
- Interactive map of Broadford, Pennsylvania
- Location within Pennsylvania
- Country: United States
- State: Pennsylvania
- County: Fayette
- Township: Connellsville
- Time zone: Eastern (EST)

Broadford, or Broad Ford, is an unincorporated community in Connellsville Township, Fayette County, Pennsylvania, southeast of Pittsburgh in the United States. Broadford is on the Youghiogheny River downstream from Connellsville. Galley Run, a tributary to the Youghiogheny River, joins here.

== History ==
Broadford was formerly the site of an A. Overholt and Company Distillery, maker of Old Overholt rye whiskey. Established in 1853, this was the second distillery operated by the Overholts; the other was at West Overton, Pennsylvania. Abraham Overholt and his son, Henry S. Overholt, operated the distilling company until their deaths in 1870. Henry Clay Frick, Pittsburgh industrialist and Abraham Overholt's grandson, later owned a majority share of the company. Ruins and some extant buildings are present in the town.

Broadford was also once the junction of the Pittsburgh & Connellsville Railroad which ran along the Youghiogheny and the Mount Pleasant & Broad Ford Railroad spur to Mount Pleasant (both railroads later part of B&O, now CSX). Today, Amtrak's Capitol Limited operates through Broadford, before stopping in Connellsville.

The town experienced a coal mining and coke production boom in the early 20th century but, by the middle of the century, the distillery, which had survived Prohibition distilling medical spirits, was the only major employer. National Distillers Products Corporation, which acquired the distillery in 1933, later shut it down and moved Old Overholt production to Cincinnati, Ohio.
