= EMD GP11 =

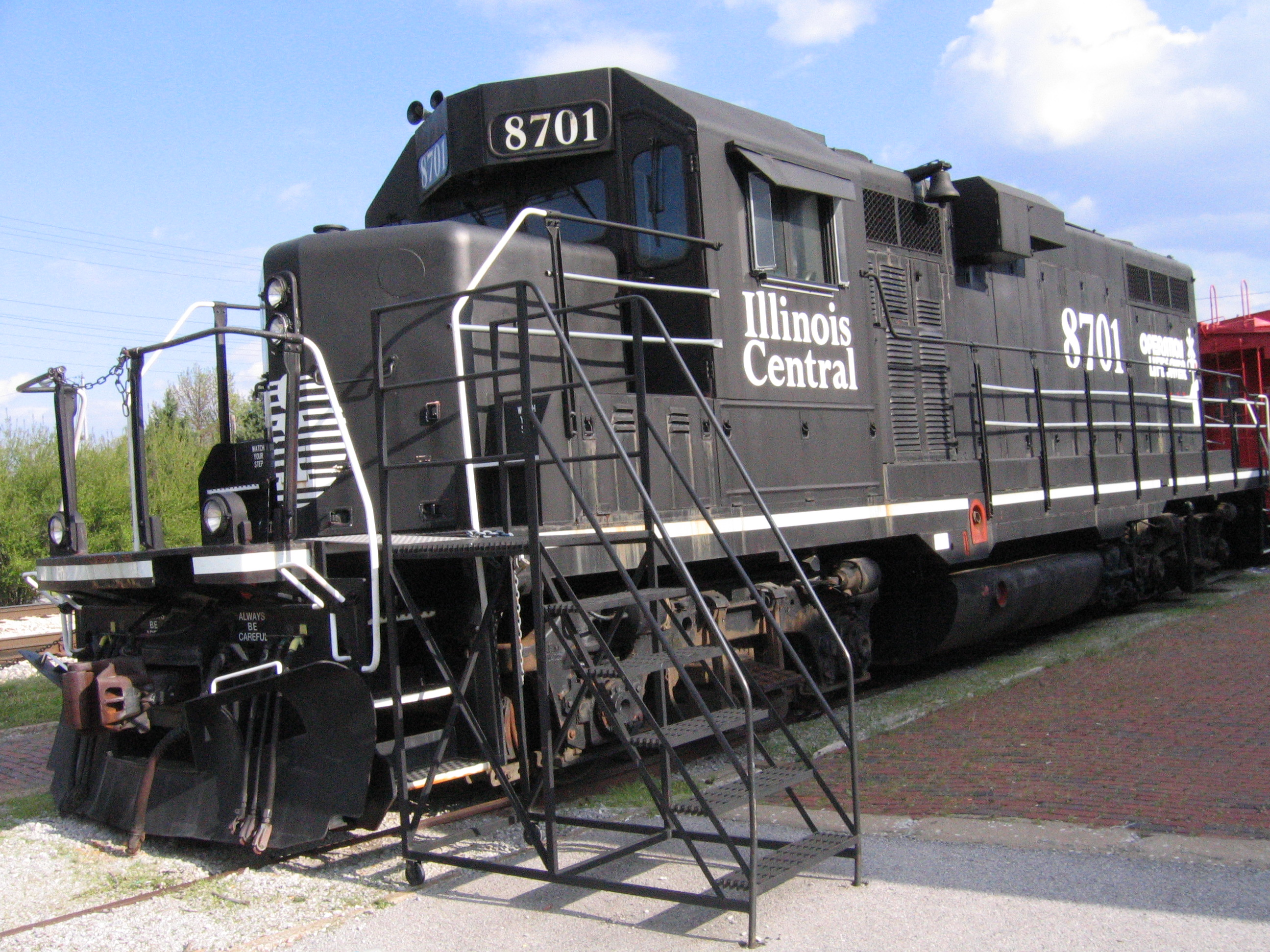
- An Illinois Central GP11 now on permanent display in downtown Carbondale, Illinois. This is the second GP11 rebuilt by ICG's shops in Paducah, Ky The first GP11 was numbered 8301. After this unit was rebuilt the 8700-series was created for the GP11s. It was intended that 8301 would be renumbered 8700, but that never happened.
Type and origin
- Power type: Diesel-electric
- Builder: GM Electro-Motive Division (EMD) (Rebuilt by Illinois Central Railroad)
- Total produced: 54
- Rebuild date: April 1978 – 1981
Specifications
- Configuration
  - AAR: B-B
- Gauge: 4 ft 8 1/2 in (1,435 mm)
Career
- Operators: Illinois Central Railroad
- Disposition: Several in service, some preserved

The EMD GP11 is a four-axle diesel locomotive rebuilt by the Illinois Central Railroad's Paducah shops. It is very similar in appearance to the GP8 and GP10.

The Illinois Central Railroad began its GP11 rebuilding program in 1978. All units were rebuilt from recycled EMD GP7, GP9 or GP18 parts. Spotting features are an angled cab, exterior paper air filter, new air intake for the traction motors and four exhaust stacks. Internally they had Dash 2 solid state electrical equipment.

== Original buyers ==
A total of 54 of these remanufactured locomotives were built from April 1978 to 1981. The first prototype unit of this model was numbered 8301. To avoid confusion the 8700-series was created to separate the GP11s from the GP10s. It was intended that 8301 would be renumbered 8700 but that never happened. IC units 8701 through 8726 were built in 1979 while units 8727 through 8750 were built in 1980; the remaining three from 8751 to 8753 were built in early 1981.

Core units for the rebuilds came from IC GP9, a lone IC GP18, MBTA GP9, RDG GP7 and UP GP7, GP9 and GP9B.

In Spring 1979, the Clinchfield Railroad sent six GP7s to Paducah to be rebuilt to GP11s. These units were called GP16s by Clinchfield.

Railroad	Quantity	Road numbers	Notes
Illinois Central	1	8301	Built 1978
Illinois Central	26	8701-8726	Built 1979
Illinois Central	24	8727-8750	Built 1980
Illinois Central	3	8751-8753	Built 1981
Total	54		

== Disposition ==
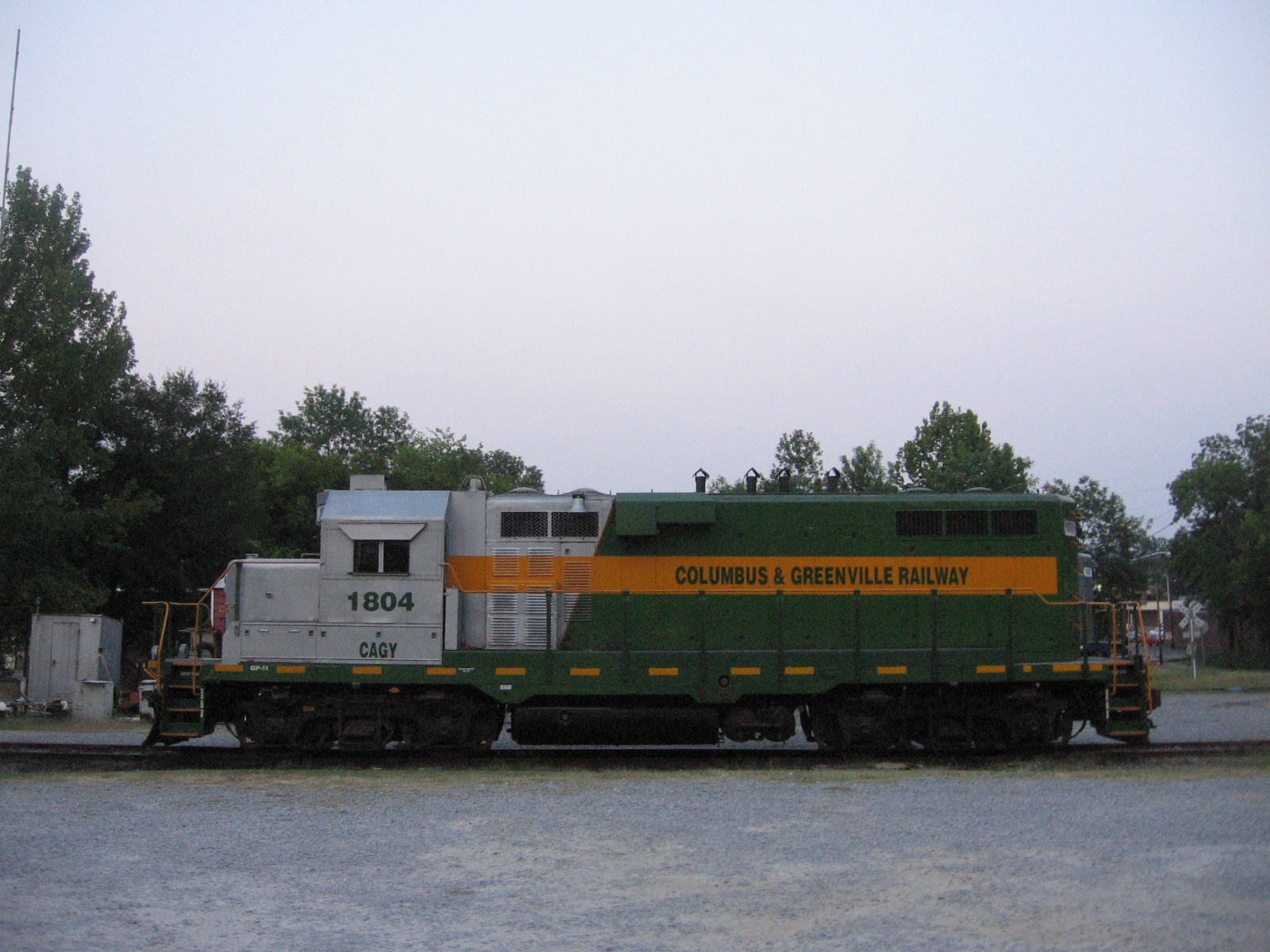
A former IC GP11 now owned by the Columbus and Greenville Railway

The majority of Illinois Central's GP11 roster was retired prior to Canadian National's purchase of the railroad, though many of these engines can still be seen in service on other short-line railroads and/or preserved in various locations.

- Illinois Central #8701, the second production GP11 rebuild from the Paducah shops in 1979, is now preserved & sitting on static display outside the passenger station in downtown Carbondale, Illinois.
- Illinois Central #8733, a former GP9 rebuilt in 1980, was donated to the Monticello Railway Museum in Monticello, Illinois, by Canadian National in 2001 where it has since been restored and remains in operational condition.
- Illinois Central #8749, a former EMD GP9 rebuilt in 1980, later went on to other railroads, first SLR 8749, then NREX 8749, SWP 8749, and currently is SWP 2006. Originally built as IC 9314 GP9 in December 1957.
- Illinois Central #8702 and 8712 were both built in Paducah shops, and are still active locomotives for Genesee and Wyoming's Youngstown Belt Railroad which was formally a part of Ohio Central Railroad System.
- Illinois Central #8706 and #8730, built in 1979 and 1980 respectively, are still active locomotives for Tradepoint Rail (Formerly Patapsco and Back Rivers Railroad) in Sparrows Point, Maryland.
- Illinois Central #8710 is active as BSFX 107 on the Big South Fork Scenic Railway in Sterns, KY. Originally built as IC 9330 (GP9). After ICG it was sold to SCFE 9024 and renumbered to USSC 310 before being sold to run on the BSFX.

== See also ==
- List of GM-EMD locomotives
