= Upper Tyrone Township, Pennsylvania =

Township in Pennsylvania, US

Coordinates: 40°05′00″N 79°36′59″W

Upper Tyrone Township
- Township
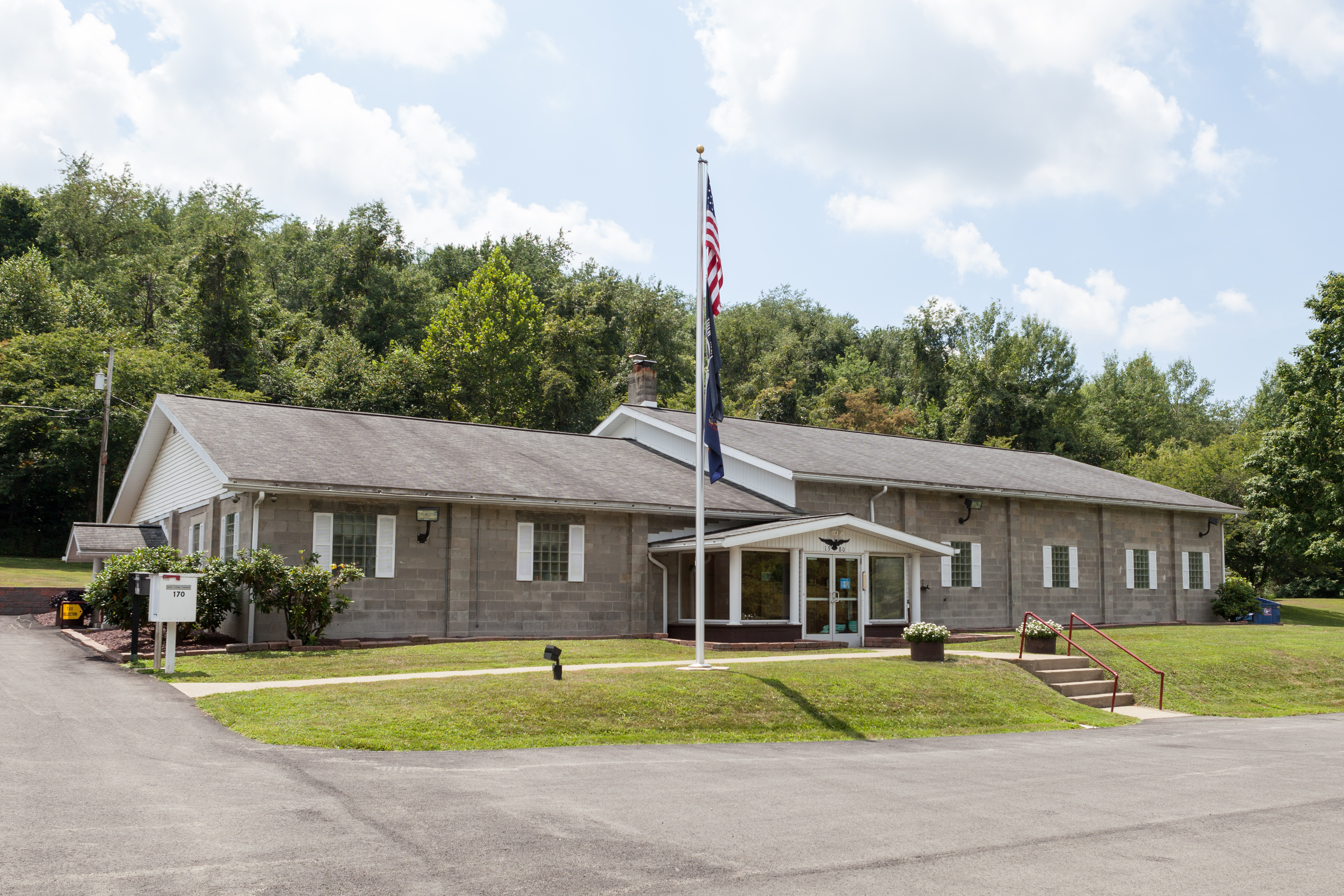
- Municipal Building

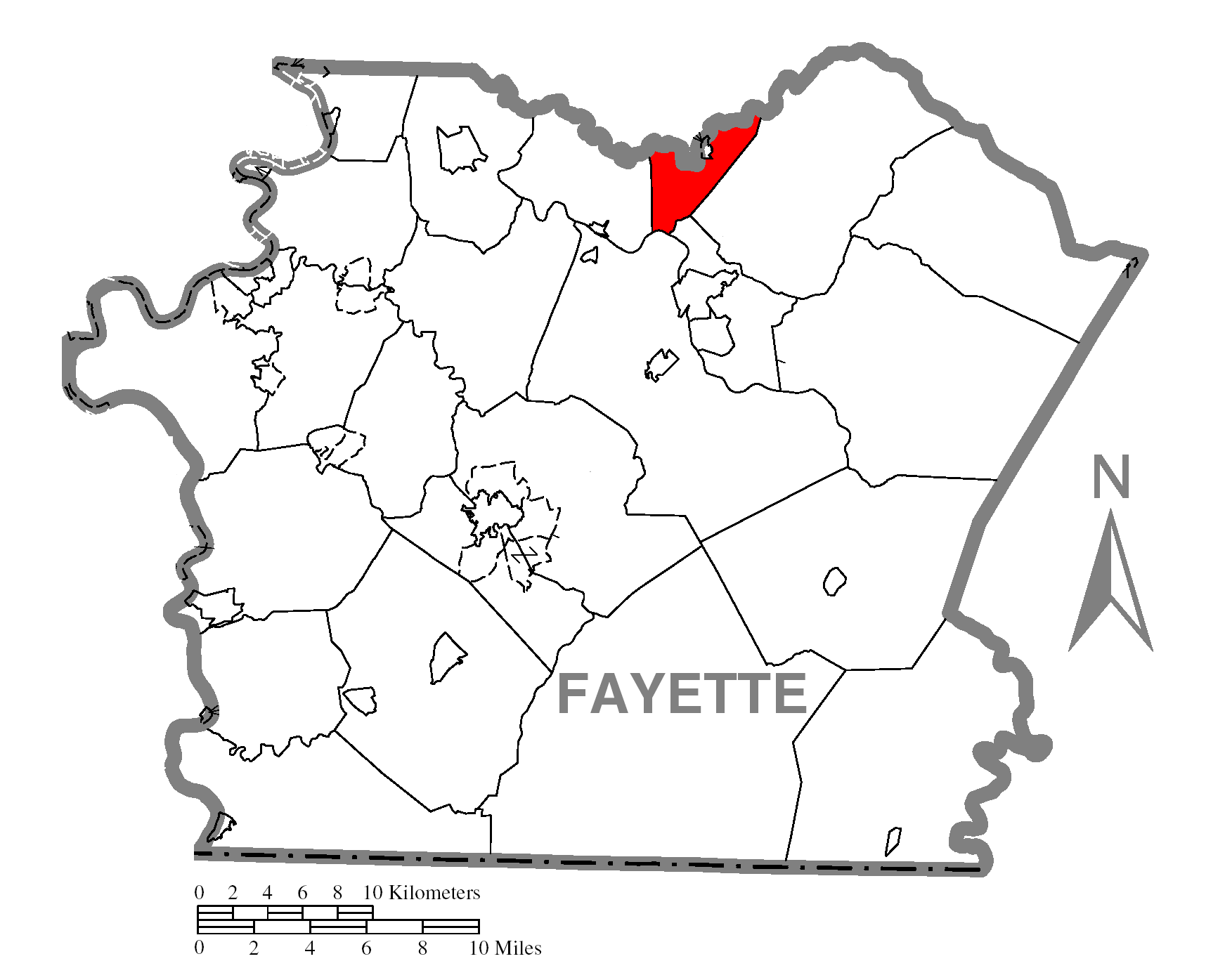
- Location of Upper Tyrone Township in Fayette County

- Location of Fayette County in Pennsylvania
- Country: United States
- State: Pennsylvania
- County: Fayette

Area
  - Total: 7.82 sq mi (20.25 km^{2})
  - Land: 7.80 sq mi (20.20 km^{2})
  - Water: 0.023 sq mi (0.06 km^{2})

Population (2020)
  - Total: 1,768 ▼
  - Estimate (2022): 1,726
  - Density: 255.2/sq mi (98.52/km^{2})
- Time zone: UTC-4 (EST)
  - Summer (DST): UTC-5 (EDT)
- Area code: 724
- FIPS code: 42-051-79344
- Website: uppertyronetwp.org

Upper Tyrone Township is a township that is located in Fayette County, Pennsylvania, United States. The population was 1,768 at the time of the 2020 census. It is served by the Southmoreland School District.

Communities in the township include Keifertown, King View, Owensdale, McClure, Dry Hill, Walnut Hill, and part of Prittstown.

The township is named after County Tyrone, Northern Ireland.

== Geography ==
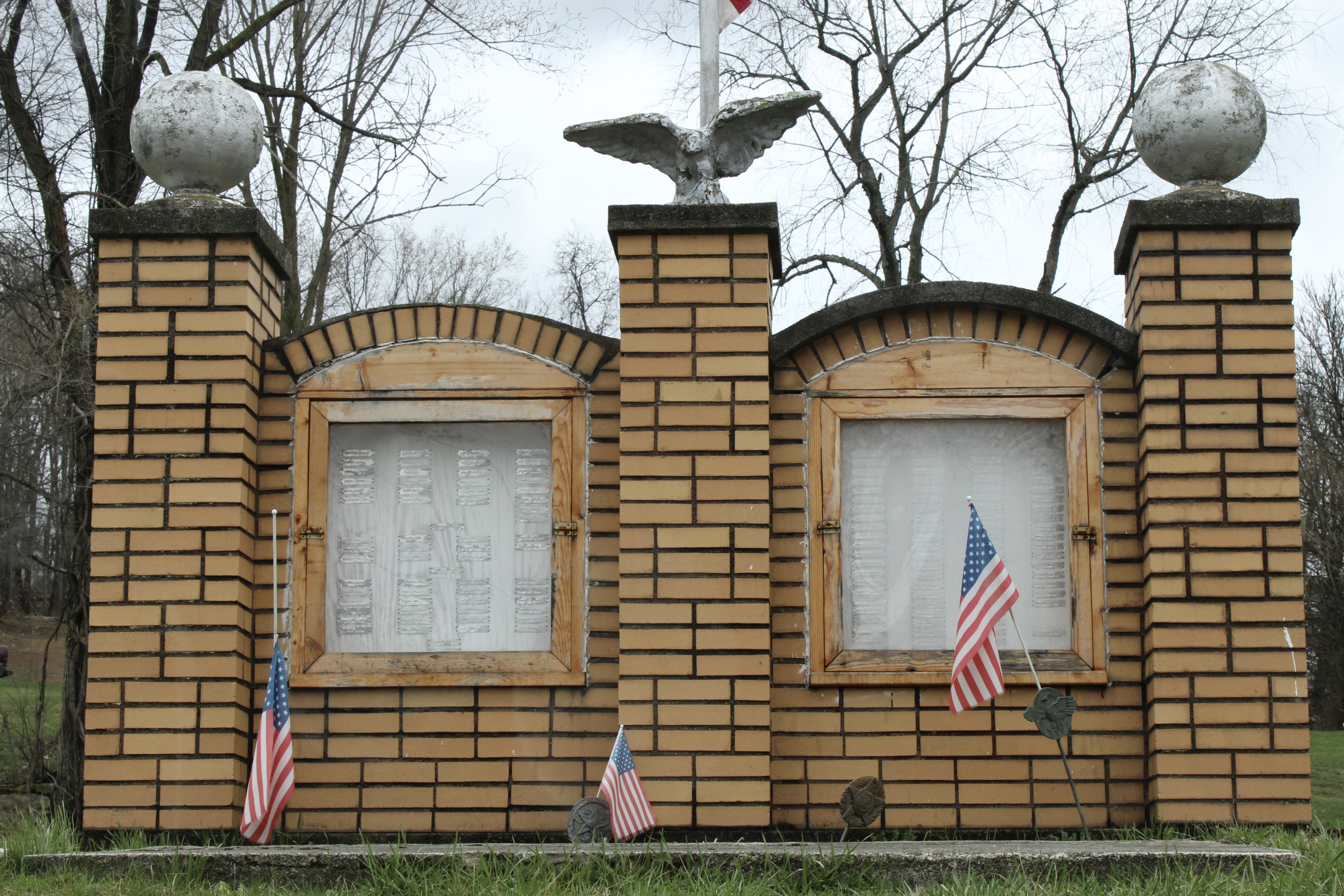
Owensdale Honor Roll in Upper Tyrone Township

The township is located on the northern edge of Fayette County and is bordered to the north by Westmoreland County. Jacobs Creek forms the northern border of the township and the county line. The borough of Everson, a separate municipality, lies along the south side of Jacobs Creek next to the township.

According to the United States Census Bureau, the township has a total area of 7.82 square miles (20.25 km^{2}), of which 7.80 square miles (20.20 km^{2}) is land and 0.02 square miles (0.06 km^{2}), or 0.27%, is water.

== Demographics ==
Historical population
Census	Pop.	Note	%±
2010	2,059		—
2020	1,768		−14.1%
2022 (est.)	1,726		−2.4%
U.S. Decennial Census

As of the 2000 census, there were 2,244 people, 870 households, and 664 families residing in the township.

The population density was 288.4 inhabitants per square mile (111.4/km^{2}). There were 902 housing units at an average density of 115.9 per square mile (44.7/km^{2}).

The racial makeup of the township was 98.62% White, 0.80% African American, 0.04% Native American, 0.04% Asian, 0.04% Pacific Islander, and 0.45% from two or more races. Hispanic or Latino of any race were 0.49% of the population.

There were 870 households, out of which 31.3% had children under the age of eighteen living with them; 61.1% were married couples living together, 10.2% had a female householder with no husband present, and 23.6% were non-families. 21.4% of all households were made up of individuals, and 10.3% had someone living alone who was sixty-five years of age or older.

The average household size was 2.58 and the average family size was 2.97.

Within the township, the population was spread out, with 22.8% of residents who were under the age of 18, 7.8% from 18 to 24, 29.6% from 25 to 44, 24.1% from 45 to 64, and 15.7% who were 65 years of age or older. The median age was 38 years.

For every 100 females, there were 99.5 males. For every 100 females age 18 and over, there were 100.1 males.

The median income for a household in the township was $28,106, and the median income for a family was $32,050. Males had a median income of $26,146 compared with that of $20,069 for females.

The per capita income for the township was $13,439.

Approximately 9.8% of families and 10.0% of the population were living below the poverty line, including 10.2% of those who were under the age of eighteen and 14.2% of those who were aged sixty-five or older.
