= Lloyd Center for the Environment =

Non-profit organization in the USA

Coordinates: 41.5404°N 70.9778°W

The Lloyd Center for the Environment is a non-profit organization that provides educational programs on aquatic environments in southeastern New England in the United States.

The Lloyd Center’s 55 acres (220,000 m^{2}) of estuary and maritime forest in South Dartmouth, Massachusetts, was donated to the Dartmouth Natural Resources Trust in 1978 by Karen Lloyd as a living memorial to her mother, Katharine Nordell Lloyd. Lloyd Center programming began in 1981. Five walking trails offer scenic views of the Slocum River, Buzzards Bay, Demarest Lloyd State Park, Mishaum Point, and Cuttyhunk Island. The Chaypee Woods Trail snakes its way through stone walls that hearken back to farming days when dairy cattle, ducks, and chickens were raised there. Steep steps and slopes mix with the vistas of the salt marsh, oak-hickory forest, freshwater wetlands, kettleholes, moraine, and a Native American midden site.
