= Ann Alexander (ship) =

Whaling ship from New Bedford, Massachusetts

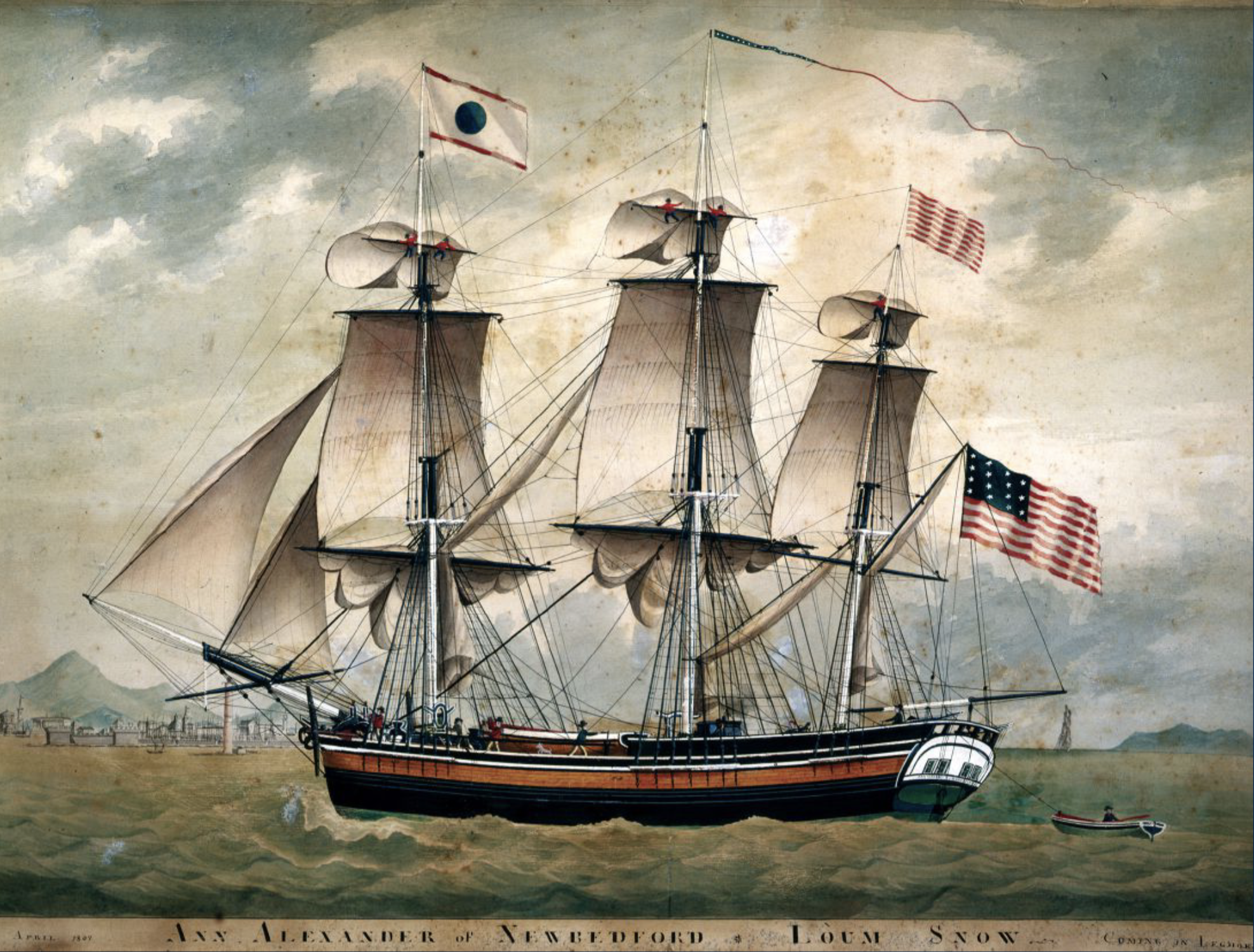
The Ann Alexander depicted coming into Leghorn April 1807.

The Ann Alexander was a three-masted ship from New Bedford, Massachusetts. She is notable for having been rammed and sunk by a wounded sperm whale in the South Pacific on August 20, 1851, some 30 years after the famous incident in which the Essex was stove in and sunk by a whale in the same area.

== Early history ==
The Ann Alexander was a ship-rigged wooden-hulled trading vessel. She was built in 1805 by Joel Packard and Deliverance Smith at Russells Mills Village in Dartmouth, Massachusetts, and registered at New Bedford on 29 January 1806. Her first documented voyages were with American export goods from New York to Leghorn, Italy and to Liverpool, England after her registration.

It is claimed that the Ann Alexander, with Capt. Loammi (Loum) Snow of Rochester, Massachusetts, in command, encountered the British fleet a few days after its victory at the battle of Trafalgar in October 1805. This first appears in print 87 years later, in a history of New Bedford, based on an interview with a 96-year-old former crew member of the ship. According to a later account of 1912, the ship was on a voyage from New York to Leghorn with a cargo of general merchandise, and a deck cargo of lumber that was Snow's personal property, when they met the warships off Spain. Informed that Lord Nelson had died aboard HMS Victory and that the new commander, Admiral Collingwood, was attempting to repair the damage done to numerous ships during the naval action, Snow sold lumber, flour and apples on the spot to the British Navy. Ruth Ekstrom of New Bedford Whaling Museum Research Library considers that there was no 1805 voyage, which would have taken place before the Ann Alexander was registered and without the knowledge of the principal owner, but that the ship may have come across remnants of the British fleet repairing at Gibraltar on the voyage to Leghorn in early 1806 and sold goods and timber on that occasion.

According to the same 1912 account, in February 1807, with Snow still in command, the Ann Alexander was captured off Rock of Lisbon on a voyage from St. Ives, England to Leghorn by a Spanish privateer, who replaced all but Snow and a mate with a prize crew, and set a course for Spain. She was immediately captured the next day by a British man-of-war, who replaced the Spanish prize crew with one of their own, and turned their prize toward Gibraltar. Just short of landfall, they were captured again by another Spanish privateer and taken to Algiers. Upon landing, Snow immediately reported the previous British prize captain for piracy, preventing the authorities from knowing the ship's latest seizure was by Spain. The Algerian authorities allowed him to take possession of his ship and proceed to Leghorn. It was later reported in June 1807 that the Ann Alexander, coming from Leghorn, was detained by the British at Portsmouth.

== Sunk by a sperm whale ==
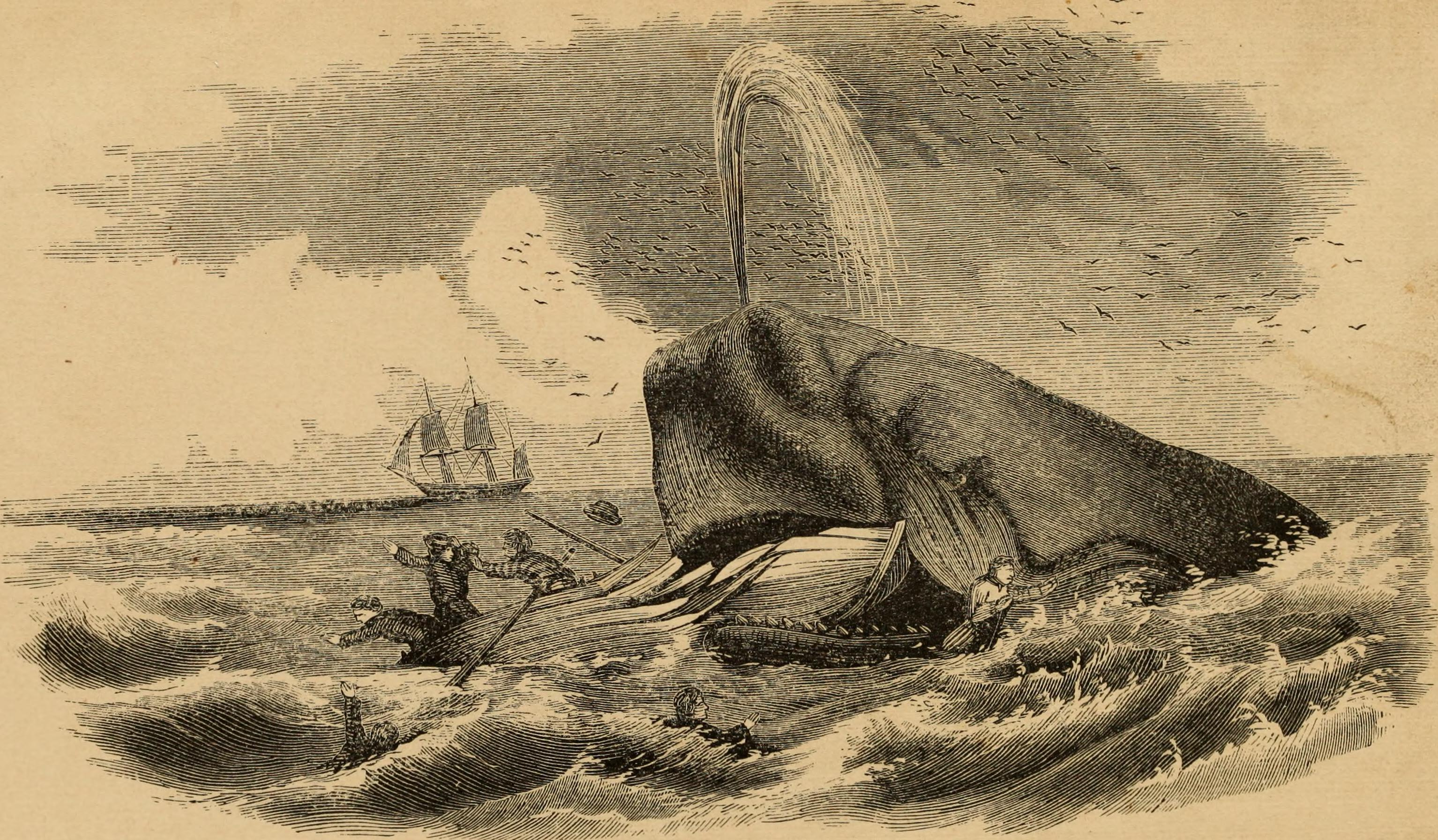
Depiction of the attack on the crew of the Ann Alexander in Man Upon the Sea (1858)

Under the command of Captain John Deblois, the Ann Alexander left New Bedford on June 1, 1850, for the whaling grounds in the Pacific. After taking on about 500 barrels of oil, she rounded Cape Horn in January, 1851. After taking on provisions in Chile and dropping a sailor at Paita, Peru, she headed west to the "Offshore Ground" in August, about 2,000–3,000 miles off the South American coast where more whales are likely to be located. In the Ann Alexander's case, she resumed the hunt at the latitude of 5° 50′ south, and longitude 102° west.

On August 20, the ship dropped two whaleboats; the one commanded by the first mate harpooned a whale. After hauling the tethered boat on a Nantucket sleighride, the whale turned, opened its jaws, and attacked and destroyed it. The second boat, captained by Deblois, rowed to the site and saved all six crewmen.

At this point, as there were 12 men in a single boat, the waist boat was launched from the ship, which was now some six miles off. The crewmen were divided between the two boats, and it was decided to attack the whale again with the waist boat, under the first mate's command, in the advance. When the whale saw the boats returning, he attacked again, this time destroying the waist boat. Deblois rescued the crew for a second time and attempted to return to the Ann Alexander in the last remaining boat. The wounded whale again rushed the boat and passed within a few cables of it, but did not directly attack it.

Once the whalers were aboard the Ann Alexander, a smaller boat was launched to retrieve the whaleboat oars, and Deblois decided to hunt the whale from the safety of the ship. Another harpoon was sunk into its head, and after a feint towards the ship, the whale seemed to disappear under the surface. At this point it was nearly sundown, so Deblois decided to abandon the pursuit. Moments later, the whale reappeared, moving at a speed of about 15 knots (a little over 17 mph), towards the ship, which was making only five knots. The whale rammed the slower-moving ship, which was unable to outrun or avoid it, and put a hole in the hull of the ship, below the waterline some two feet from the keel. Like most ships of that time, the Ann Alexander carried a large amount of pig iron as ballast, so in an attempt to keep her from sinking immediately, Deblois ordered the crew to cut away the anchors and throw all heavy metal cables overboard. The crew only succeeded in cutting away one anchor and cable, and the ship began to sink rapidly. Deblois made his way to the cabin, where he seized a sextant, chronometer and chart. A second attempt to obtain anything beyond the provisions and water that were being loaded into the remaining boats was fruitless, as the ship was almost completely heeled over and flooded. The 22 crewmen had no choice but to abandon ship, with Deblois, the last to leave, being forced to swim to the closest boat.

== Retrieval and rescue ==
It was soon discovered that they possessed only twelve gallons of water and no food at all, and the boats, containing eleven men each, leaked and had to be bailed out throughout the night. The next day, seeing that the Ann Alexander had not yet sunk but was on her beam ends, Deblois went on board to cut away the masts with a hatchet, in the hope this would lessen the drag. The ship partially righted itself, and the crew, using spades, were able to cut the foremast anchor chain, which helped bring her onto a more even keel. Using ropes tied around their waists, the whalers then lowered themselves over the side and cut holes through the decks to get to the food stores, but obtained only five gallons of vinegar and twenty pounds of waterlogged bread. The ship became unstable, so they returned to their boats and rowed away.

They had water rations for only a few days, but Deblois reckoned that if they headed for a northerly latitude with more rainfall they might survive. Two days later, at around 5 p.m. on August 22, they sighted and were rescued by the Nantucket whaler Nantucket under the command of Captain Gibbs. A last attempt to retrieve anything from the Ann Alexander was abandoned due to rough seas, and the crew was eventually landed in Paita on September 15, 1851. They all returned to New York via the schooner Providence on October 12.

== Melville and Moby-Dick ==
Just a few months later, October 18, 1851, and November 14, 1851, the first editions of Hermann Melville's great whaling novel Moby-Dick, inspired by the Essex attack, were published in London and New York City.

Melville commented, "Ye Gods! What a commentator is this Ann Alexander whale. What he has to say is short & pithy & very much to the point. I wonder if my evil art has raised this monster."

== Aftermath ==
Weak with infection from the two harpoons and pieces of timber from the attack embedded in its head, the whale was caught and killed five months later by the crew of the Rebecca Sims, and yielded 70–80 barrels of oil.

While an accidental collision with a sperm whale at night accounted for sinking of the Union in 1807, the Essex incident some 30 years beforehand was the only other documented case of a whale deliberately attacking, holing, and sinking a ship. However, these two incidents are probably not as much of a freak occurrence as they appear to be.

Observations of aggression in male cetaceans, and more generally in male artiodactyls, suggest that head-butting during male-male aggression is a basal behavior. Carrier, Deban, & Otterstrom (2002) suggest that the enlarged melon or spermaceti organ may have evolved into a battering ram, used to injure an opponent in such attacks. The ability of the sperm whale to aggressively attack and destroy ships some 3–5 times its body mass in this manner is therefore hardly surprising. The 5-month period that elapsed between the sinking of the Ann Alexander and the killing of the whale involved, demonstrates that long-term survival was possible after combat with a much larger ship and so, presumably, with another whale as well.

== See also ==
- In the Heart of the Sea: The Tragedy of the Whaleship Essex (2000), a National Book Award-winning work of maritime history by Nathaniel Philbrick telling the Essex story from the point of view of both Nickerson and Chase.
- In the Heart of the Sea (2015 film), the above book adapted into a feature film by director Ron Howard, starring Chris Hemsworth, Ben Whishaw, and Cillian Murphy.
