= Slocum's River Reserve =

Protected landscape in Massachusetts, US

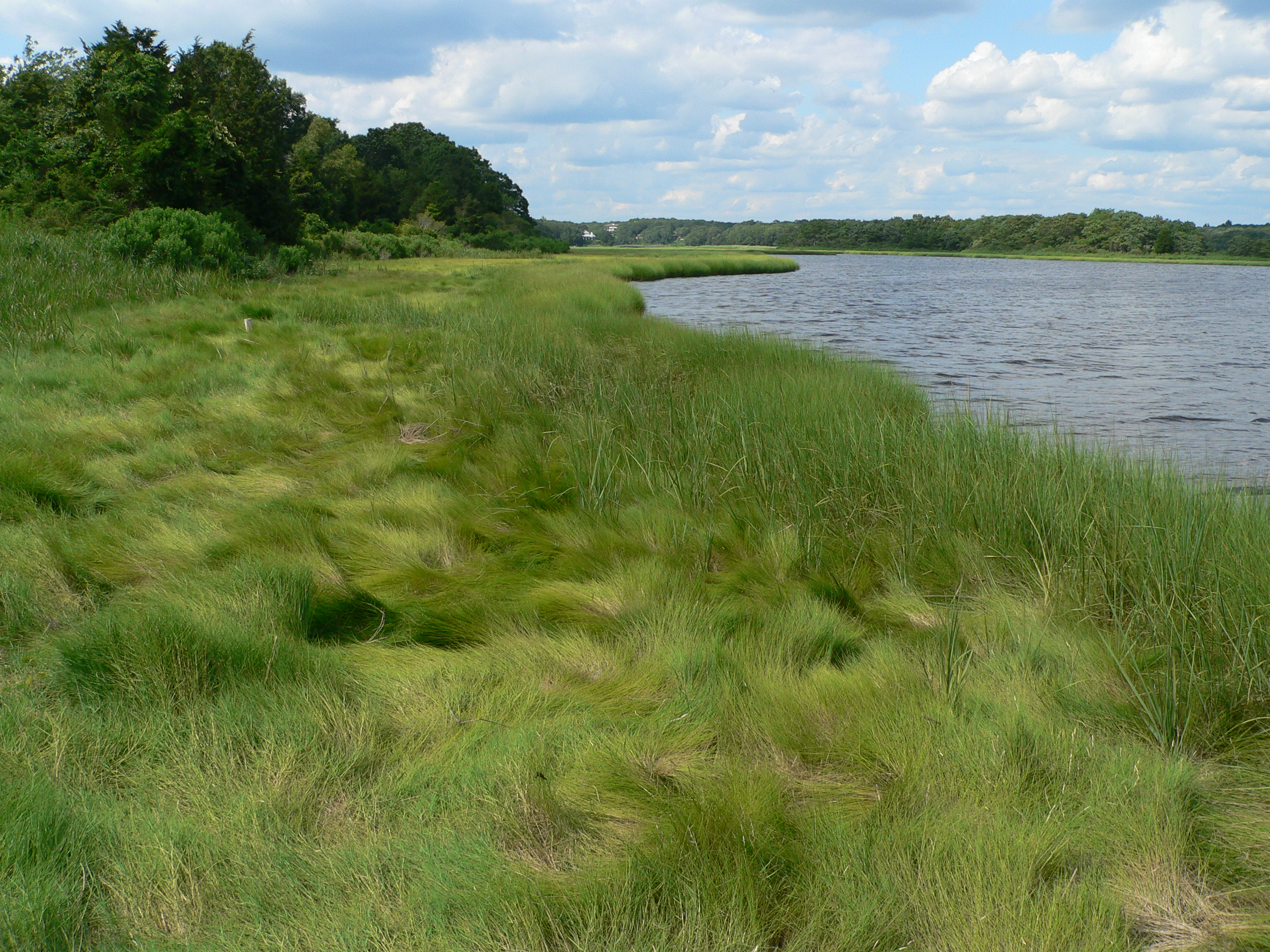
- Interactive map of Slocum's River Reserve
- Location: Massachusetts, United States
- Coordinates: 41.5519°N 71.0092°W
- Established: 1999
- Operator: The Trustees of Reservations and The Dartmouth Natural Resources Trust
- Website: The Trustees of Reservations; The Dartmouth Natural Resources Trust

Slocum's River Reserve is a 47-acre (19 ha) open space preserve co-managed by the land conservation non-profit organizations The Trustees of Reservations and The Dartmouth Natural Resources Trust. The property includes 3,000 feet (910 m) of frontage along the tidal Slocum's River in Dartmouth, Massachusetts, 2 miles (3.2 km) of trails, woodland, agricultural fields, and pasture. The reserve is open to the public.

== History ==
Slocum's River Reserve was formerly known as Island View Farm; it was purchased in 1999 by The Trustees of Reservations and Dartmouth Natural Resources Trust.

== Conservation and recreation ==
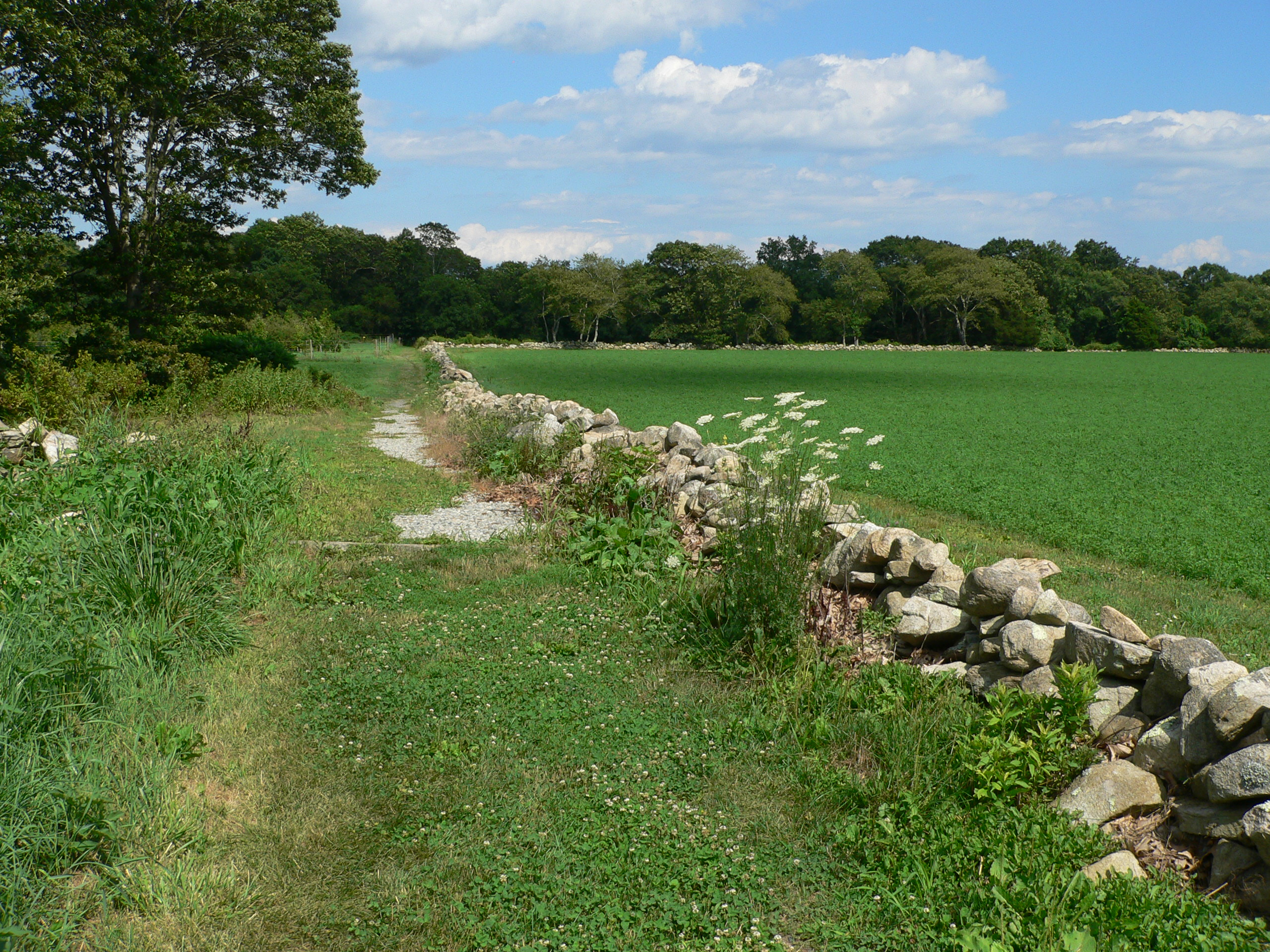

Trails on the property connect with MassWildlife's Dartmoor Farm Wildlife Management Area, via easements over 60 acres (24 ha) of private farmland conserved via agricultural preservation restriction (APR). The farmland produces corn, alfalfa, and horticultural nursery stock and are used to graze livestock. The property trailhead is located on Horseneck Road in Dartmouth. The reserve is a popular birding spot.
