= Ben Shattuck =

American writer, painter, and art curator (born 1984)

- Born: 1984 (age 41–42); Dartmouth, Massachusetts, USA
- Education: Cornell University (BA); University of Iowa (MFA)
- Occupations: Writer, curator
- Spouse: Jenny Slate (m. 2021)
- Children: 1
- Writing career
- Years active: 2021–present

Ben Shattuck (born 1984) is an American writer, painter, and curator. Born in Massachusetts, he received a bachelor's degree from Cornell University and a master's degree from the Iowa Writers' Workshop. He has written two books, and the screenplay for The History of Sound, based on two of his short stories.

== Early life and education ==
Shattuck was born and raised in Dartmouth, Massachusetts. His parents both work in the arts in Massachusetts; his mother owns an art gallery while his father is a painter. Shattuck attended Deerfield Academy for high school, Cornell University for college, and the Iowa Writers' Workshop for his Master's of Fine Arts in fiction. He taught fiction writing while at the University of Iowa as a graduate teaching assistant, and then at Victoria University of Wellington.

== Career ==
Shattuck's first book, Six Walks, was published by Tin House in 2022. The memoir tracks the author's retracing of six walks taken by Henry David Thoreau, which brings about personal memories and emotional insights. It received a starred review from Publishers Weekly. His second book, The History of Sound: Stories, was published by Viking in 2024.

In 2021, Shattuck and his brother bought the general store in their hometown, Davolls General Store, which was originally built in 1793.

His first published short story, "Edwin Chase of Nantucket" was published in 2016. Shattuck's short stories and essays have been published in a number of magazines.

His 2018 story "The History of Sound," first published in The Common, was published in the Pushcart Prize anthology. Shattuck's The History of Sound won The Story Prize Spotlight Award for short story collections published in 2024. It also won the Mark Twain American Voice in Literature Award in 2025.

Shattuck wrote the screenplay for The History of Sound based on that story and "Origin Stories". It follows the relationship between two men, Lionel (Paul Mescal) and David (Josh O'Connor), directed by Oliver Hermanus and released in 2025 by Mubi and Focus Features/Universal Pictures International. In 2021, Hermanus said of his decision to direct the film: "I instantly fell in love with Ben Shattuck's flawlessly beautiful short story and knew I had to be involved in its journey to the screen."

== Personal life ==
In 2019, Shattuck lived with girlfriend Jenny Slate in Massachusetts, where she was also born and raised. They got engaged after Shattuck proposed during a picnic at a French castle later that year. Their daughter was born in late 2020. Their wedding was postponed three times due to the COVID-19 pandemic, and they married in their living room on December 31, 2021.
