= Sunrise Bakery and Coffee Shop =

Bakery chain

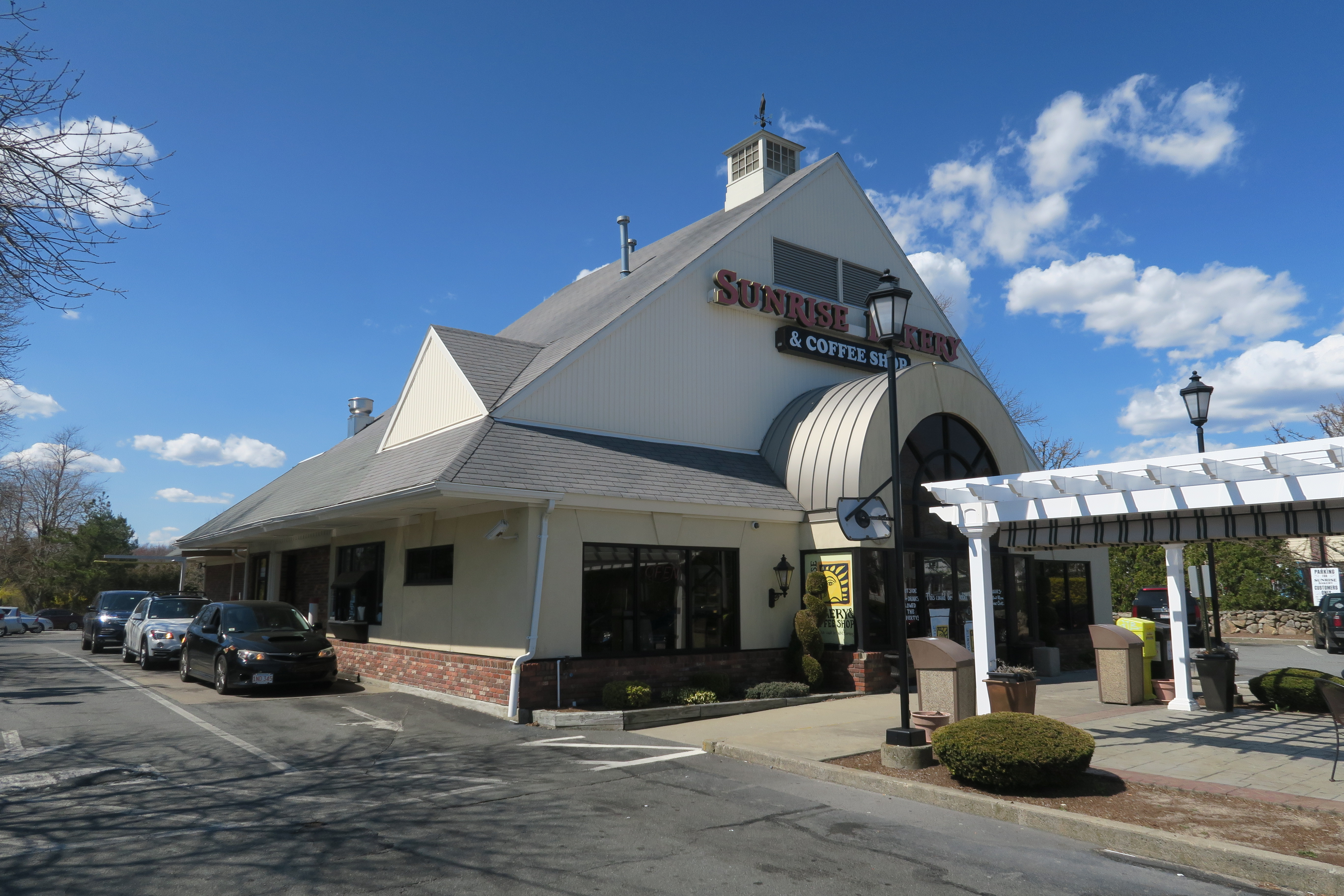
- Sunrise Bakeries Dartmouth Location
- Founded: May, 1980
- Founder: Manny and Joseph Amaral
- Headquarters: New Bedford and Dartmouth, Massachusetts
- Number of locations: 1 stores
- Website: http://sunrisebakeryandcoffeeshop.com/

Sunrise Bakery and Coffee Shop was a chain of bakeries in New Bedford, and Dartmouth, Massachusetts.

== History ==
=== Growth, and decline ===
The first store was opened at a strip mall in the Russells Mills Village Historic District of Dartmouth, Massachusetts in 1980. It originally only had 4 or 5 employees and was founded by Manny, and Joseph Amaral. The store also opened a location in the larger city of New Bedford. In the 1990s the company opened up another store at 571 Dartmouth Street. Their first store, which operated on property owned by Cumberland Farms, was told its license would not be renewed in October 2012, and subsequently closed. That store was filled with primarily Regulars and operated as a community hub for that area of Dartmouth.

=== Robbery ===
In April 2017 the bakery's New Bedford location was robbed of an indeterminate amount of cash at gunpoint, the suspects were later identified as Isaiah Garcia Jr, and Cesar Berroa who were also connected to robberies in Dartmouth, Somerset, Fall River, and Seekonk, Massachusetts.

=== Sale ===
The business was put on the market in January 2023, Manny Amaral, Inez Pacheco, and Joe Amaral announced that the business did have a potential buyer.

The store's second Dartmouth location closed on May 27, 2023 - leaving only their New Bedford location.

=== February 2026 Fire ===
On February 11, 2026, at approximately 10pm, the New Bedford Fire Department responded to a report of flames at smoke at the Bolton Street location. Firefighters attempted to fight the flames from the interior of the building for approximately 45 minutes before declaring it unsafe and switched to an exterior method. The fire was eventually contained with no fire-related injuries or damage to surrounding buildings. The bakery building has significant fire and smoke damage and is considered destroyed.

The cause of the fire is unknown.

== Schwartz fundraiser ==
Sunrise Bakery routinely held radiothons to benefit the Schwartz Center. A non profit charity that operates programs for children with special needs.

== Portuguese connections ==
The business is known for selling confections of Portuguese origins. Including Malasadas, Pastel de Nata, Easter Sweet Bread, as well as other traditional baked goods.
