= Slocums River =

Slocums River Slocum River, Pamanset
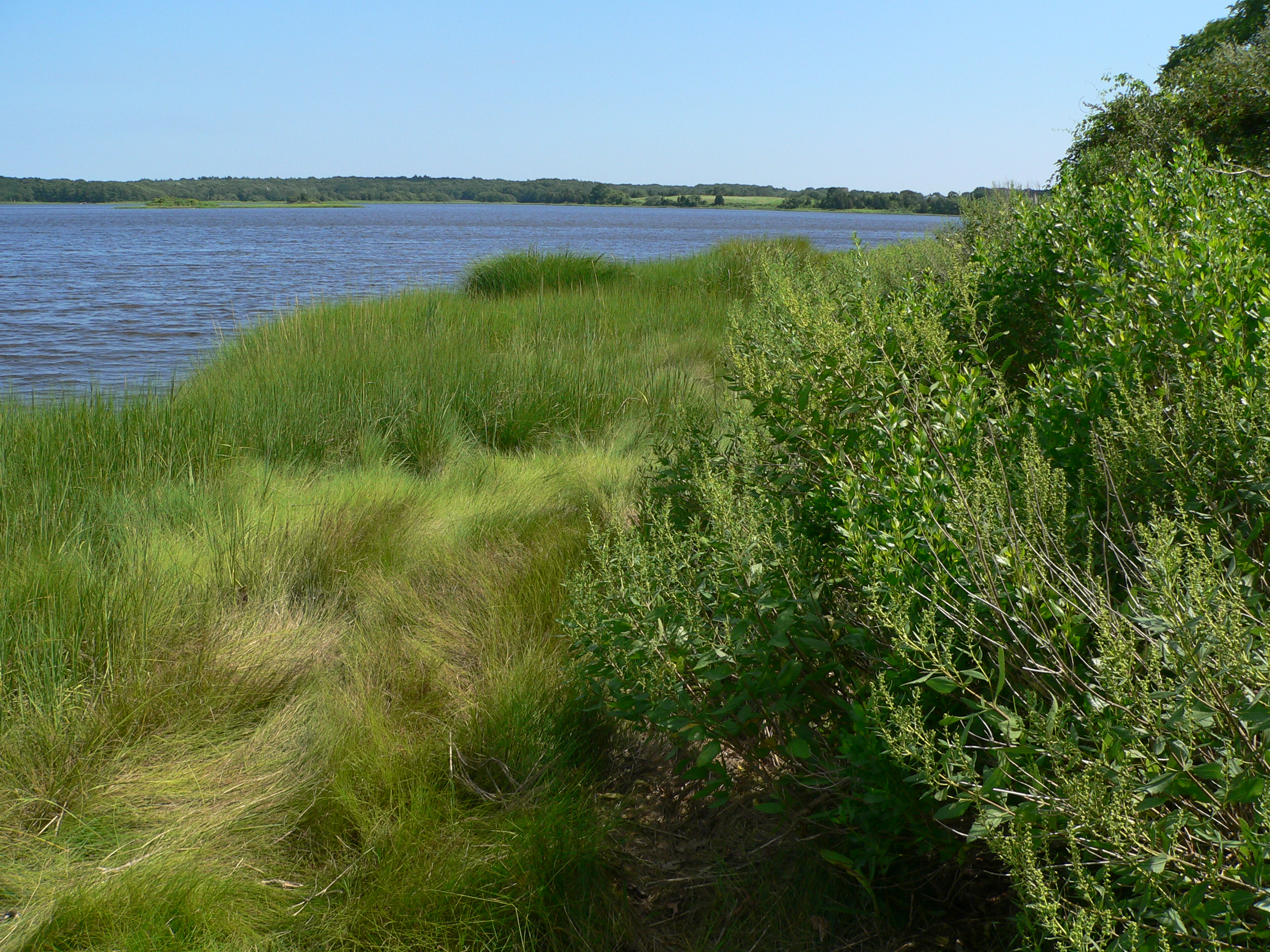
- The river at Slocum's River Reserve
- Native name: Pascamanset (Algonquin)

Location
- Country: United States
- State: Massachusetts
- Region: Bristol County
- Town: Dartmouth

Physical characteristics
- Source: Paskamanset River
- Mouth: Buzzards Bay
  - coordinates: 41°31′46″N 70°58′36″W
- Length: 5.5 mi (8.9 km)

Slocums River (sometimes seen as Slocum's River or Slocum River) is a 4.3-mile-long (6.9 km) tidal river in southeastern Massachusetts in the United States. The Paskamanset River and Slocums River really form just a single river, but the freshwater portion kept its earlier Indian name, while the salt-water portion is named for the early settlers of the area, the Slocum family.

The Slocums River flows through the town of Dartmouth to Buzzards Bay between Barneys Joy and Mishaum points.

== Description ==
The river is fronted by private lands and public reserves. The Trustees of Reservations and The Dartmouth Natural Resources Trust manage the 47-acre (19 ha) Slocum's River Reserve along the west bank. Demarest Lloyd State Park includes the west bank of the mouth of the river and protects waterfowl marshland. Both properties offer walking trails and views of the river.

== History ==
In 1652 English settlers Anthony Slocum and Ralph Russell settled in the Russells Mills area, the town was named after Ralph Russell, and subsequently the river running through the town was named after Anthony Slocum.
