= Paskamanset River =

River in Massachusetts, United States

Coordinates: 41.57094°N 71.00448°W

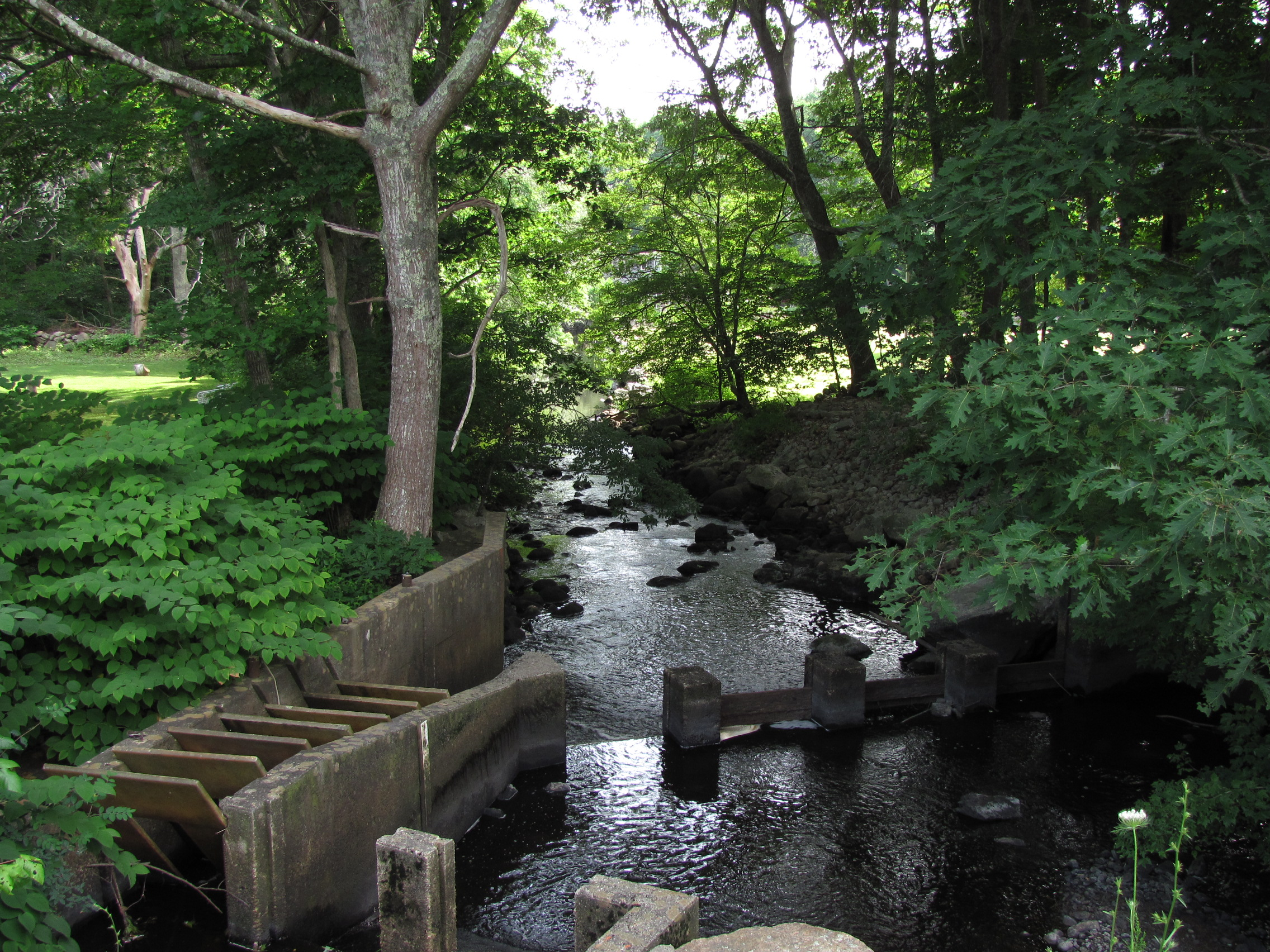
Paskamanset River in Russells Mills Village

The Paskamanset River, also known as the Paskamansett River, is a 13.4-mile-long (21.6 km) river in New Bedford and Dartmouth, Massachusetts. The Paskamanset and Slocums River really form just a single river, but the freshwater portion kept its earlier Native American name, while the salt-water portion is named for early English settlers, the Slocum family.

The river originates in the Acushnet cedar swamp in New Bedford, and in Sassaquin Pond, also called Myles Pond. It runs through Dartmouth, passing under U.S. Route 6 and the town's former dump, and heading toward Russells Mills, and eventually drains into the Slocums River, with an associated floodplain in Apponagansett Swamp.

The river has been polluted for some years, mainly by pathogens and overly high nitrogen levels. Both appear caused primarily by the town's dump. It was closed in 1995 and capped to prevent future contaminated runoff, but decades of waste have been leaching into the river.

In addition, although the river has historically supported large river herring runs, the fish have greatly declined since the mid-1970s. This may be caused by rapid urbanization and by dam construction. Efforts are now underway to restore herring runs to the river.
