= Nantucket (ship) =

Whaler built in Nantucket, Massachusetts in 1837

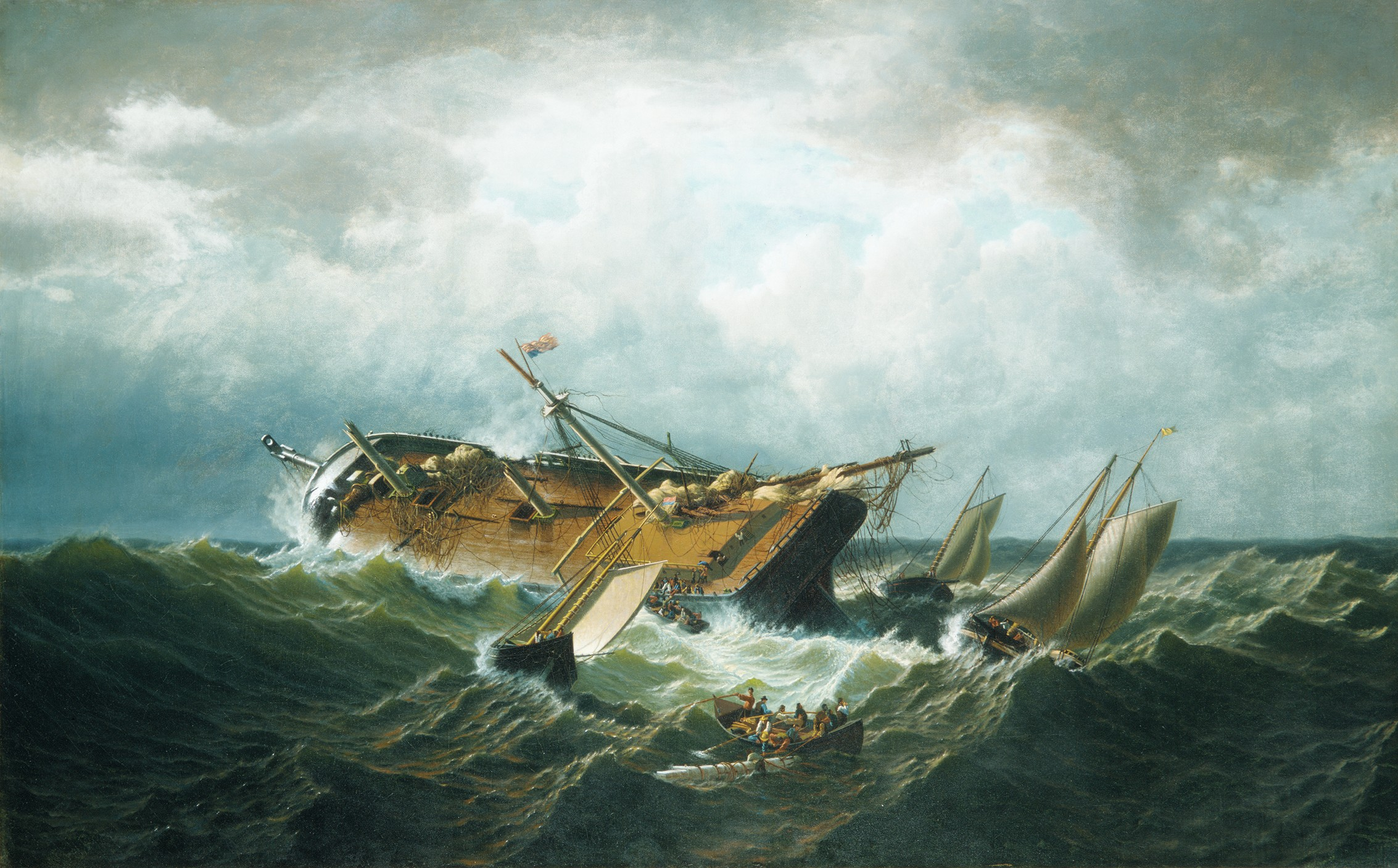
- Painting by William Bradford, who observed the scene the day after the wrecking.

History
- Name: Nantucket
- Port of registry: (United States) Nantucket, Massachusetts
- Completed: 1837
- Fate: Wrecked off Island of Nashawena, August 7, 1859

General characteristics
- Type: Whaler
- Tons burthen: 350 (bm)

The Nantucket was a 350-ton whaler built in Nantucket, Massachusetts, in 1837. First master, David N. Edwards, 1837-40 (left ship, replaced by F. C. Sanford), then: George Washington Gardner, 1841–45; Benjamin C. Gardner, 1845–50; Richard C. Gibbs 1850-54 (rescued Captain John Deblois and his crew two days after the ship Ann Alexander was sunk by a whale); Richard C. Gibbs (1855–59).

On Nantucket's last voyage, Richard C. Gibbs carried his wife, Almira, who kept a detailed and very interesting journal. The ship whaled off the Pacific coast of South America, and Almira Gibbs' journal includes many descriptions of South American ports and people, as well as accounts of social encounters with other whaling wives.

"Almira went a-whaling with no romantic illusions at all -- which was lucky, as the old ship was slow and uncomfortable. "I can hardly walk about, I fetch up sometimes where I start for and sometimes somewhere else," she wrote in June 1857. Captain John Deblois, the man rescued by Richard Gibbs after his ship Ann Alexander was sunk by a whale, carried his wife, Henrietta, on the whaling ship Merlin, and in May 1858 she and Almira Gibbs met in one of the mid-sea visits whalemen called "gams." Henrietta wrote, "The sail proved to be the Nantucket, Captain Gibbs. They came on board and spent the day. Had a delightful time. Very pleasant people. Under God, I am indebted to Capt. G. for the safety of my husband."

The Nantucket did not raise the shores of home until the afternoon of August 7, 1859. Block Island was sighted at two p.m. A pilot was taken on board at four p.m., and he wrecked the ship on the southwest end of the Island of Nashawena. "So ends a long voyage," wrote Almira. "Saved our oild but lost the Ship after carrying us safely over thousands of miles by water we left her upon the Rocks." Details of the ship come from Judith Navas Lund, whaling Masters and Whaling Voyages Sailing from American Ports. Almira's journal is quoted extensively in Joan Druett, Petticoat Whalers, Whaling Wives at Sea 1820-1920. (University Press of New England, 2001).
