= Hixville Village Historic District =

Historic district in Massachusetts, United States

- U.S. National Register of Historic Places
- U.S. Historic district
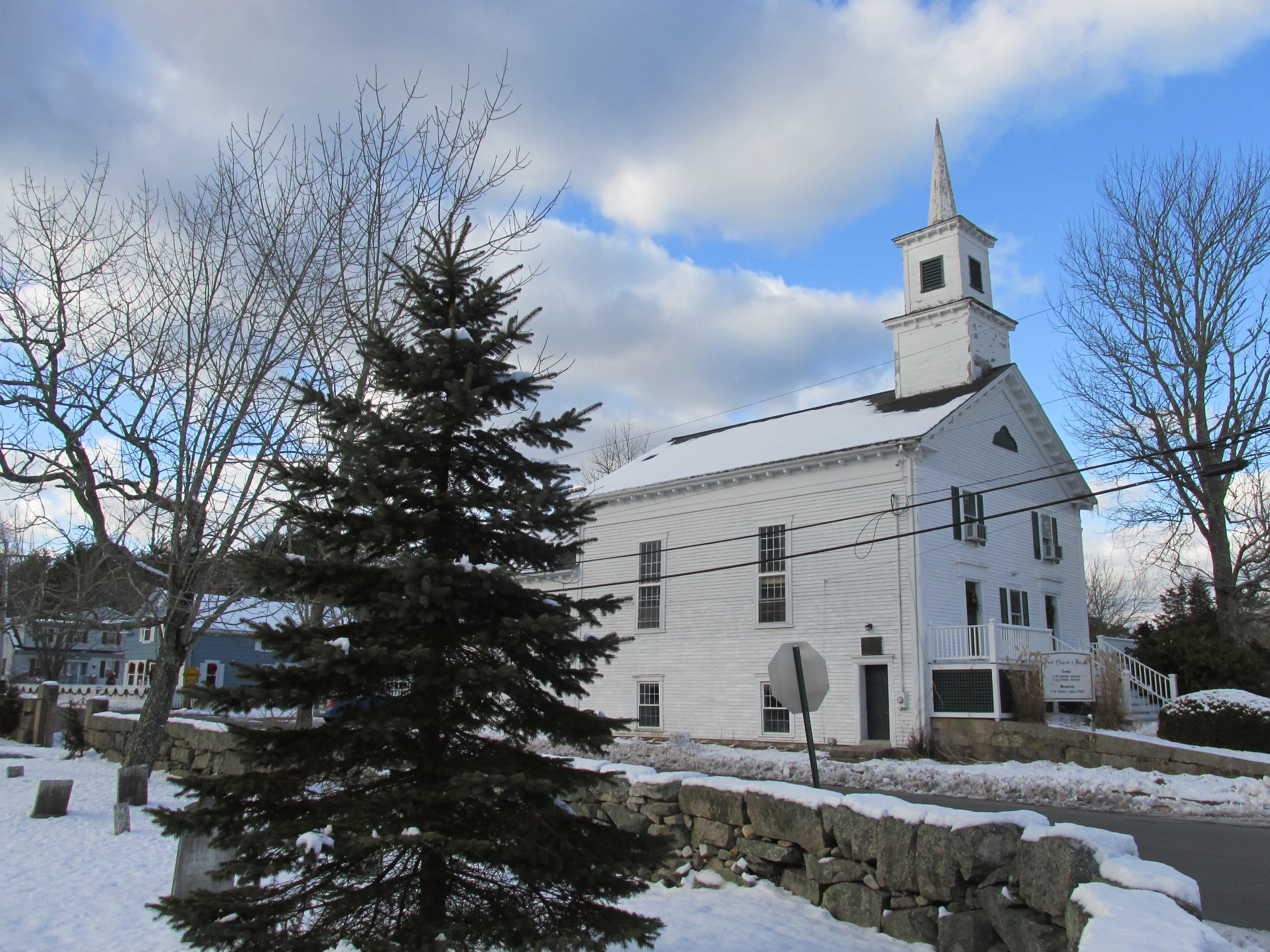
- First Church of Hixville

- Location within Massachusetts Location within the United States
- Location: Dartmouth, Massachusetts
- Coordinates: 41°40′56″N 71°1′56″W
- Built: 1785
- Architectural style: Greek Revival, Federal
- NRHP reference No.: 91000698
- Added to NRHP: June 17, 1991

The Hixville Village Historic District is a historic district in Dartmouth, Massachusetts.

The intersections of North Hixville Road and Old Fall River Roads, the historic cemetery, The North Hixville Road Fire Station, Cornell Pond on the Copicut River, Hixville General Convenience Store and The First Church of Hixville define the center of Hixville Village in North Dartmouth, Massachusetts. This area was listed on the National Register of Historic Places in 1991.

The term "Hixville" generally refers to the north-northwestern section of North Dartmouth, Massachusetts, north of Interstate 195 along North Hixville Road, Hixville Road, Reed Road, Old Fall River Road, Collins Corner Road, and Flag Swamp Roads. The Center of Hixville is located equidistant, half-way, approximately 5 miles (8.0 km) from the nearby cities of Fall River and New Bedford.

The boundaries of Hixville extend to the Westport border to the west, Fall River and Freetown to the North-West and north, the woods between Collins Corner and Flagg Swamp Roads (going south from the Collins Corner/Flagg Swamp Road Intersection) and the woods between the Shingle Island River and Harry M. Renyolds Drive along Old Fall River Road (going east–west) to the east, and Interstate 195 to the south.

== History ==
The town of Dartmouth was settled in 1652, and Incorporated 1664. The town grew over the subsequent years, leading up to the Revolutionary War. In that growing town, Daniel Hix founded the First Baptist Church of Dartmouth in 1780. He was a farmer who served in the Continental Army during the Revolutionary War. Five years later, he built a meeting house for the Church, and then built a second meetinghouse in 1811. By this time, the area around Hix's church had come to be known as "Hixville". Finally, that congregation, which was now known as the Hixville Christian Church, built another meetinghouse in 1853 on the same spot. This building, which was built in the Greek Revival style, still stands in the center of the village, and holds weekly services.

== See also ==
- National Register of Historic Places listings in Bristol County, Massachusetts
