= Davolls General Store =

General Store in Dartmouth, Massachusetts

Coordinates: 41°34′19″N 71°00′20″W

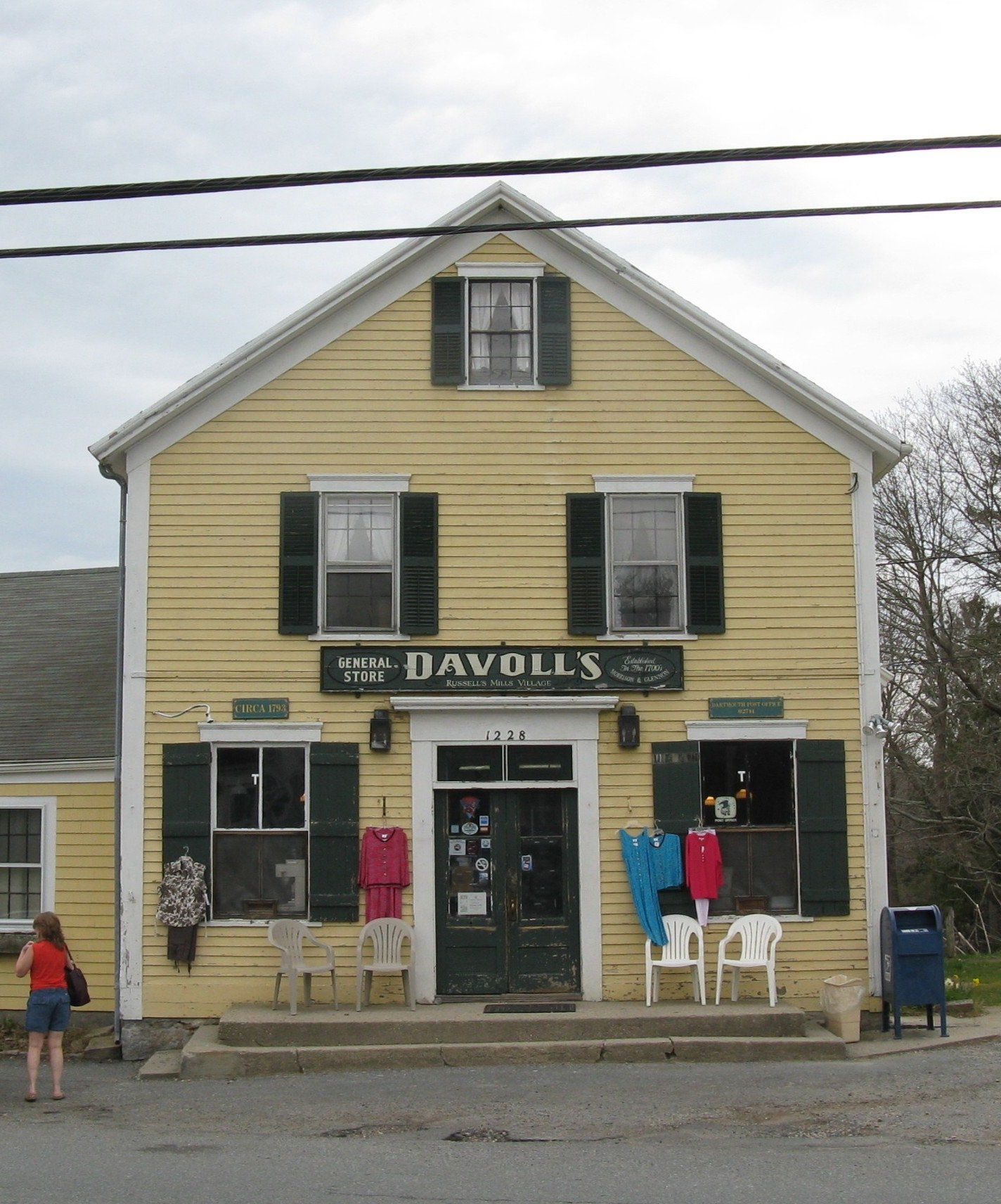
- The Storefront in 2009
- Former names: Slocum's Store

General information
- Architectural style: Federal
- Location: 1228 Russells Mills Road, Dartmouth, Massachusetts
- Opened: 1793
- Owner: Ben and Will Shattuck

Technical details
- Floor count: 2.5
- Grounds: 0.63 Acres

Website
- www.davolls.com

Davoll's General Store is a general store in the Russells Mills Village Historic District in Dartmouth, Massachusetts, United States. It is owned by brothers Will and Ben Shattuck. It is the oldest continually operating General Store in Massachusetts, established in 1793. It is on the National Register of Historic Places, coupled with the entire Russells Mills area.

== History ==
The lot was originally owned by brothers John, Daniel, and Giles Russell. The building where the store would be created was purchased in 1780 by Michael Wainer, who sold the building to William Howland in 1792; however, Howland did not start using the building as a general store until 1793. The store changed hands several times over the course of the 1800s, but primarily stayed in the hands of the Howlands, Tuckers, and Slocums. In the second half of the 19th century, the store went by the name Slocum's Store, until it was purchased by the Davolls at the start of the 20th century when its name changed to Davolls General Store. The Davolls co-owned the store with Nancy Slocum and Australian whaler John Thomas Sherratt. Following the Davolls’ ownership of the store, it retained the same name and passed through several more owners, including a 42-year stint by the Morrisons and Glennons.

In the store's early history it did not just serve as a location to purchase items, but also was a trading station. The store also provided newspapers. Once, Davolls caught on fire and was covered in soot. In Davolls, Russell's Mills Captain Smith purchased a ball for his son before he sailed away on a whaling voyage. Owner John Sherratt was also a whaler. He was signed onto a whaling voyage as a cabin boy by his father in his home of Albany, Australia. His father was supposed to rescue him at the first port of call but missed the connection. Sherratt continued on to Dartmouth where he became involved in town politics and eventually would be buried in the South Dartmouth Cemetery after dying in 1924.

Throughout its entire history Davolls sold a variety of everyday items constituting the normal purpose of a general store. The store was once home to a post office, which served as Zip code 02714 and served the Russells Mills area from the 19th century until 2014. In 1810 the postmaster was Abraham Tucker. Davolls also used to sell gasoline, with both a pump and a tank located outside the store before failing an annual pressure test.

The store was completely overhauled during the Arruda and Chouinard ownership period. The owners conducted an award-winning renovation for the first year and a half of their store ownership period.

== Ownership history ==
- Ben Shattuck and Will Shattuck (2021–present)
- Kim Arruda and Jim Chouinard (2016–2021)
- Wilfred & Virginia Morrison, Beverly Morrison Glennon and Dr. Joseph R. Glennon (1974–2016)
- Nancy Slocum, John Thomas Sherratt, Frank Davoll, & Raymond Davoll (1901–1974)
- William Allen & James H Slocum (1862–1901)
- Charles Tucker (1851–1862)
- William Tucker (1849–1851)
- Rebecca Church with ½ interest to Abner Tucker, and Nancy and Benjamin Potter ½ interest to Abner Tucker (1842–1849)
- Henry & Benjamin Tucker (1810–1842)
- Caleb Slocum (1809–1810)
- Jonathan Allen (1805–1809)
- Benjamin Cummings & Joshua Howland (1801–1805)
- William Howland (1793–1801)

== Services ==
Davolls offers a variety of produce, keeping with its history as a general store, in addition to candles, penny candy, honey, fresh produce, eggs, and local red meat. However, they also contain an independent bookstore, a cafe, and a bar serving draft beer. Outside the store a functioning antique telephone can be used to make calls, including a number that contains prerecorded messages from Ben Shattuck's wife, actress Jenny Slate. Davolls annually hosts a 'Burns Night' to celebrate Scottish poet Robert Burns as well as a monthly open Irish Session.

== Sources ==
- Glennon, Beverly (October 2001). Dartmouth: The Early History of a Massachusetts Coastal Town. New Bedford, MA: American Printing. p. 49. ISBN 978-0971459106.
