= Demarest Lloyd State Park =

Recreation area in Dartmouth, Massachusetts, U.S.

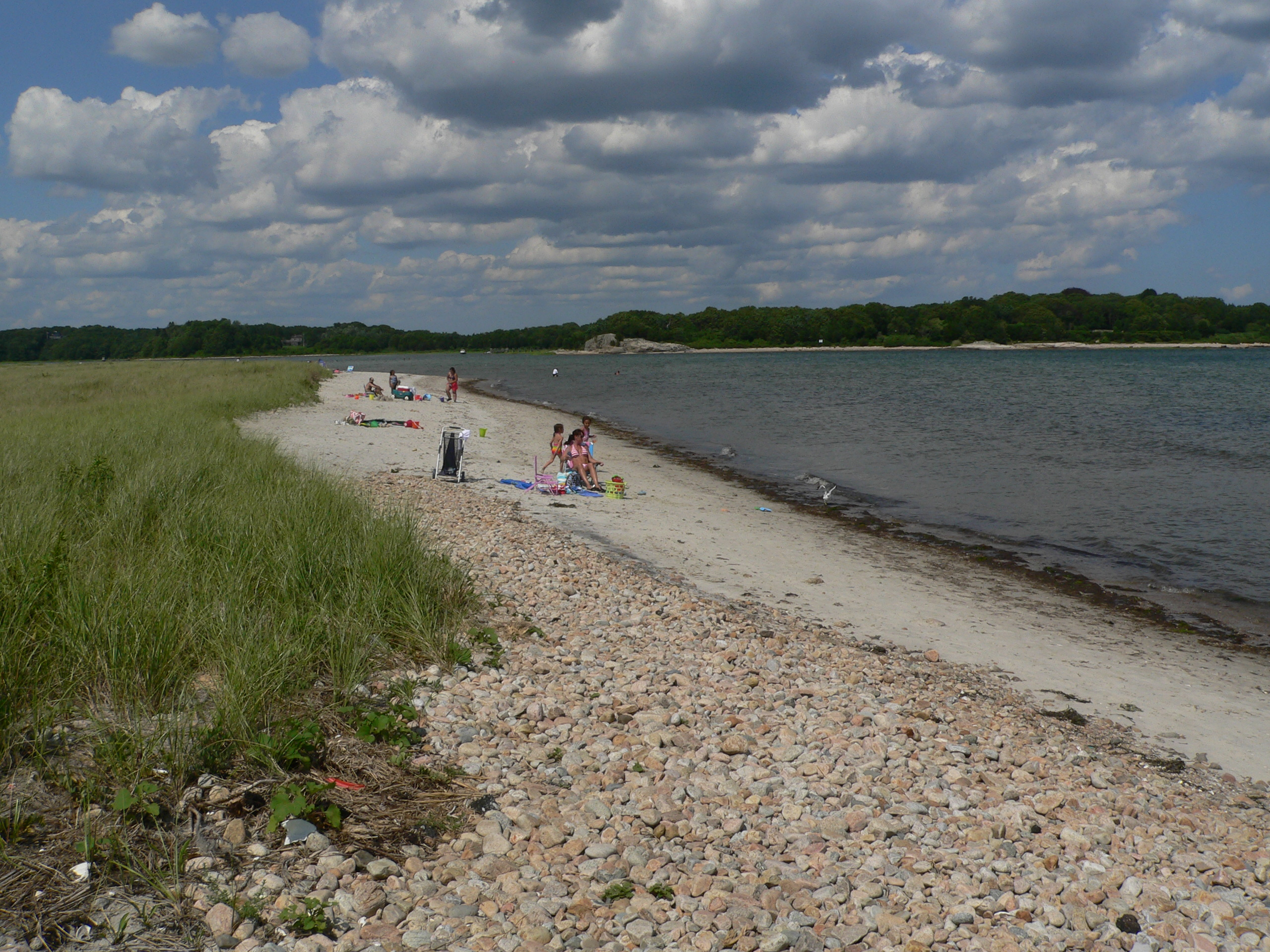

- Location within Massachusetts Location within the United States
- Location: Dartmouth, Massachusetts, United States
- Coordinates: 41°31′29″N 70°59′11″W
- Area: 200 acres (81 ha)
- Elevation: 0 ft (0 m)
- Established: 1953
- Administrator: Massachusetts Department of Conservation and Recreation
- Website: Official website

Demarest Lloyd State Park is a public recreation area located on Buzzards Bay in the town of Dartmouth, Massachusetts. The park's 200 acres (81 ha) include both an ocean beach and seaside marshlands near the mouth of the Slocums River. The state park is managed by the Massachusetts Department of Conservation and Recreation.

== History ==
The park was given to the state in 1953 by the family of Angelica Lloyd Russell, a granddaughter of the muckraking journalist, Henry Demarest Lloyd. The park was named in honor of her father, Demarest Lloyd Sr., and her brother, Demarest Lloyd Jr., a World War II Navy fighter pilot who died in action over Guam.

== Physical features ==
The park's 600-yard (550 m) sandy beach on Buzzards Bay is noted for its calm surf, shallow depths, and warm waters during summer months. At its eastern edge, marshy ground separates the park from the Slocums River. The marshlands are home to egrets, herons, ospreys, terns and hawks.

== Activities and amenities ==
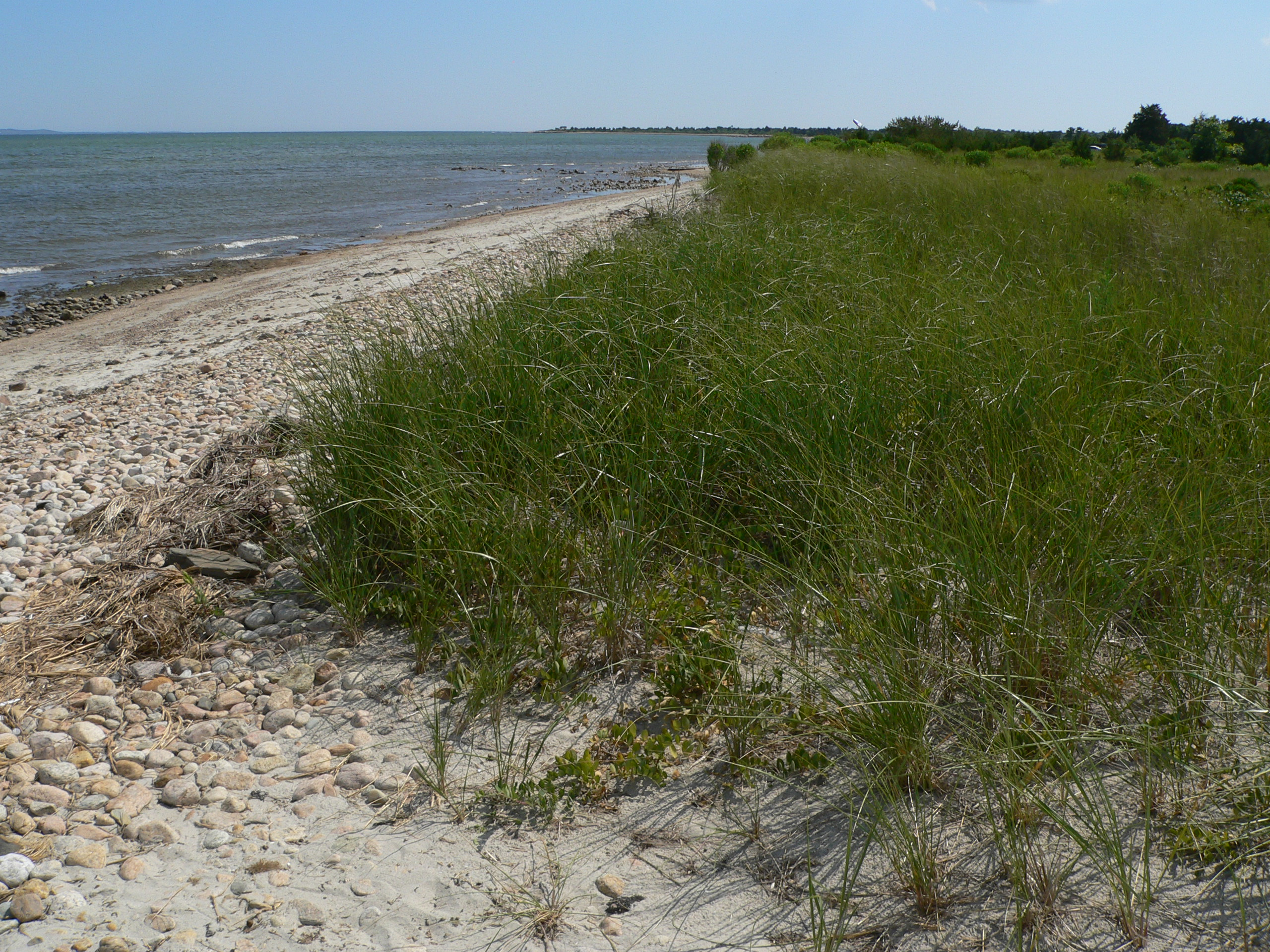

The park offers swimming, birdwatching, picnicking, fishing, non-motorized boating, and walking trails
