= Russells Mills Village Historic District =

Historic district in Massachusetts, United States

- U.S. National Register of Historic Places
- U.S. Historic district
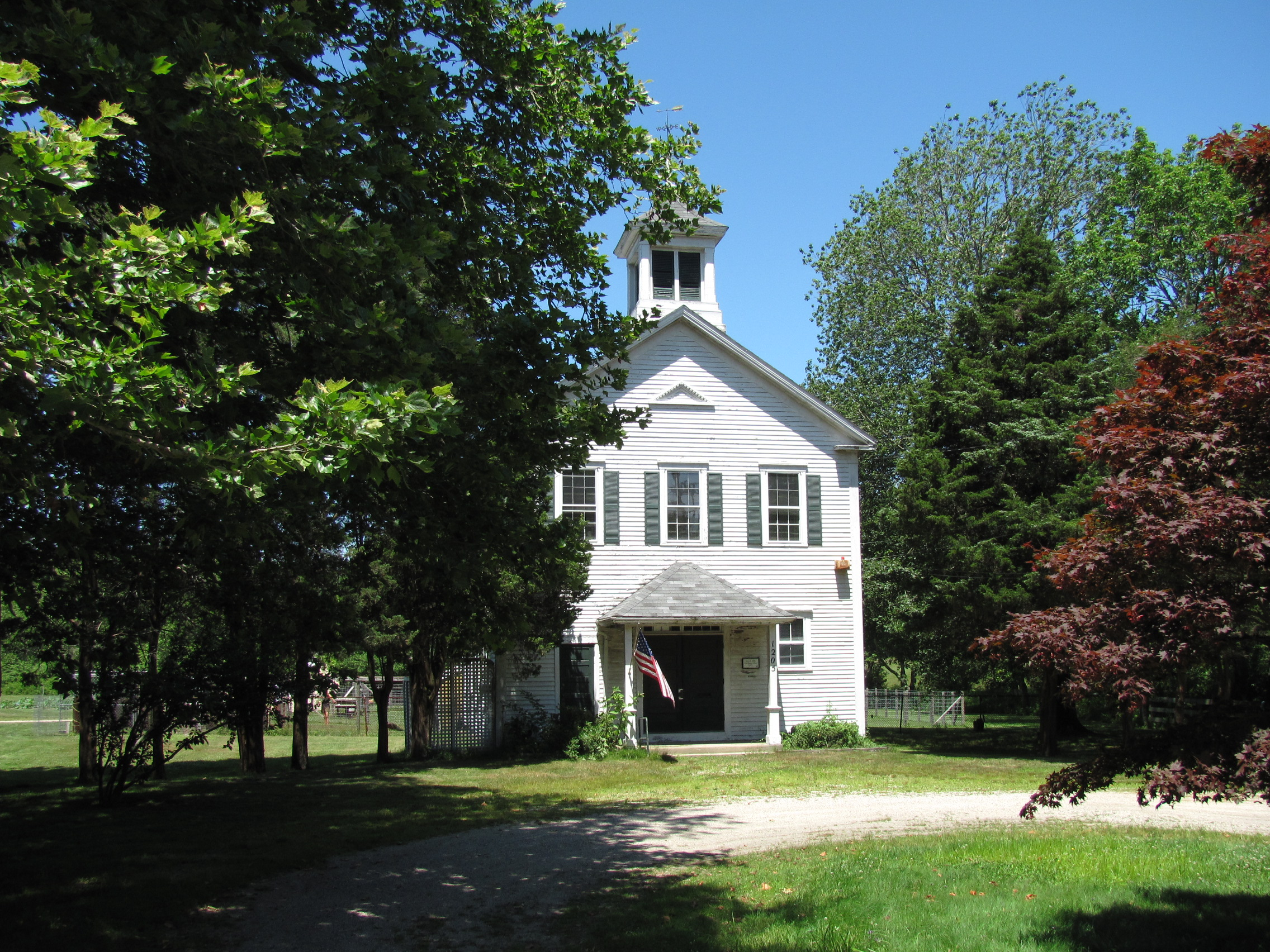
- Russells Mills Library

- Location within Massachusetts Location within the United States
- Location: Dartmouth, Massachusetts
- Coordinates: 41°34′23″N 71°0′18″W
- Area: 74 acres (30 ha)
- Architect: Multiple
- Architectural style: Greek Revival, Late Victorian, Federal
- NRHP reference No.: 85002011
- Added to NRHP: September 5, 1985

The Russells Mills Village Historic District is a historic district on Russells Mills, Rock O' Dundee, Slades Corner, Horseneck and Fisher Roads in Dartmouth, Massachusetts. It encompasses an area that was an early industrial center, flourishing from the 18th century into the early 19th century. The district was added to the National Register of Historic Places in 1985.

== Description and history ==
Russells Mills Village is approximately 4.5 miles (7.2 km) south of US Route 6, on the western bank of the Paskamanset River. The village is mainly stretched along Russells Mills and Horseneck Roads, and radiates along several other roads that extend from the village center. Just south of the village is a former mill pond that is one of the surviving elements of the village's industrial past. The village has about forty buildings, most of them wood-frame residences built in the 18th and early 19th centuries. It includes one house estimated to have been built in 1670, making it Dartmouth's oldest surviving structure, and the town's historic animal pound, a stone enclosure built in 1831. Non-residential buildings include Davolls General Store, a Federal-period general store building, a (former) church built in 1830, and two schools.

Although Dartmouth was settled as early as the 1650s, the Russells Mills area was not settled until the 1670s, when members of the Russell family arrived at the mouth of Destruction Brook at the Paskamanset River. The river was soon dammed, and the Russells began industrial activity with mills for grinding grain and sawing lumber. The area flourished economically, with a number of other milling operations taking advantage of the water power provided by both the river and Destruction Brook. In the mid-18th century a modest shipyard was established in the area. The village flourished into the 1850s, by which time its mills were eclipsed by more substantial works at Padanaram and New Bedford. As a result, most of the architecture in the village is either Georgian, Federal, or Greek Revival, reflecting the styles popular at the height of its prosperity.

== See also ==
- National Register of Historic Places listings in Bristol County, Massachusetts
