= Adam Clayton Powell Sr. =

American Baptist pastor (1865–1953)

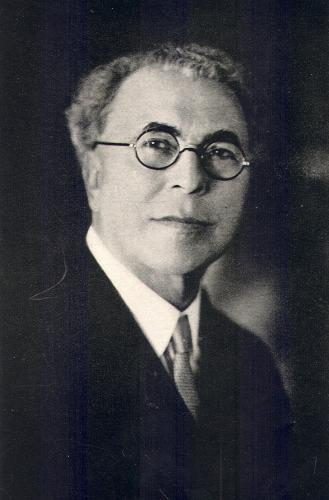
Adam Clayton Powell Sr.

Adam Clayton Powell (May 5, 1865 – June 12, 1953) was an American pastor who developed the Abyssinian Baptist Church in Harlem, New York, as the largest Protestant congregation in the country, with 10,000 members. He was an African American community activist, author, and the father of Congressman Adam Clayton Powell Jr. Born into poverty in southwestern Virginia, Powell worked to put himself through school and Wayland Seminary, where he was ordained in 1892.

After serving in churches in Philadelphia and New Haven, Connecticut, Powell was called as pastor to Abyssinian Baptist, where he served from 1908 to 1936. During the Great Migration of Black people out of the rural South, thousands of Black people who had moved to New York and Harlem became the center of African American life in the city. During his tenure, Powell supervised the purchase of land, fundraising, and the construction of a much larger church and facilities. He was a founder of the National Urban League, active in the NAACP and several fraternal organizations, and served as trustee of several historically black colleges and schools.

== Background ==
Adam Clayton Powell was born near Martin's Mill "at the conflux of Maggotty and Soak Creeks," in Franklin County, Virginia. This was in the Piedmont, above the Fall Line of the Roanoke River. His mother Sally Dunning (1842–1848–?), a free woman of color, named her first son after her older brother Adam Dunning. He headed the family as a farmer. In 1860 Sally was living with her mother Mildred, aunt Mary, and large family, including her grandmother Hannah; all the family were free mulattoes. Powell wrote in his autobiography that his mother never told him who his father was. He described her mother, Mildred Dunning (later listed as Malinda Dunnon, in the 1880 census), as "mostly Indian." Mildred was still living with her daughter and family past 1880, so he knew her well. Powell had visible European-American ancestry, in features, light skin, and blue eyes. Two years after Adam's birth, in 1867 his mother Sally married Anthony Bush (b. abt. 1845-d. 1937), a mulatto freedman (former slave). In the 1870 census, he used the surname Dunning, as did his and Sally's children.

J. Daniel Pezzoni, a preservation consultant, noted in 1995 there was a local tradition linking Powell's family to Llewellyn Powell, a white planter, who had property 10 miles away at Hale's Ford, but there was no documentary evidence for this. Wil Haygood, a 1993 biographer of Adam Clayton Powell Jr., mistakenly wrote that Sally Dunning was held as a slave by white farmer Llewellyn Powell at the time of her son Adam's birth. He asserted Powell was the father of Adam. Pezzoni noted Sally was a free woman of color, as were her mother and grandmother, proved by the 1860 census, which documented the three generations of the Dunning family.

Both Sally's mother and grandmother were free; by Virginia's principle of partus sequitur ventrem in slave law, all of their children were also born free. The Encyclopaedia of African American History (2006) claims that Powell's father was Llewellyn Powell, and that he was of German descent. (Note: Although there have been cases where German speaking migrants have switched their surname from “Paul” to “Powell” due to similarities in pronunciation, both Llewellyn and Powell are names associated primarily with Wales and England rather than Germany. )

By 1880, the Dunning family had moved to Cabin Creek, Kanawha County, West Virginia, and taken new names. Anthony, his wife and children took the surname Powell. According to biographer Charles V. Hamilton, Anthony Bush "decided to take the name Powell as a new identity." Sally's mother Mildred Dunning was listed as Malinda Dunnon in 1880, apparently changing her name, too, for their new lives in West Virginia. There was a growing African-American community in the Kanawha Valley, attracted to jobs in mills and in coal production. In 1880 Anthony Powell worked at the dam; Adam Powell at age 15 worked hauling water at the mines, and Malinda Dunnon worked as a weaver. Anthony reared Adam as his son, and he and Sally had several children together.

Adam Clayton Powell Sr. identified as black in the South and in his life. Later in life he easily passed as white for convenience when traveling by train in the South; he used it to gain better accommodations in the segregated railroad cars.

== Education ==
Powell worked through college and graduated in 1892 from Wayland Seminary, a historically black college located in Washington, DC. (It was the predecessor school of Virginia Union University). He attended Yale Divinity School (1895–1896) and earned a D.D. at Virginia Union University (1904). He was later made an honorary member of Alpha Phi Alpha fraternity.

== Marriage and family ==
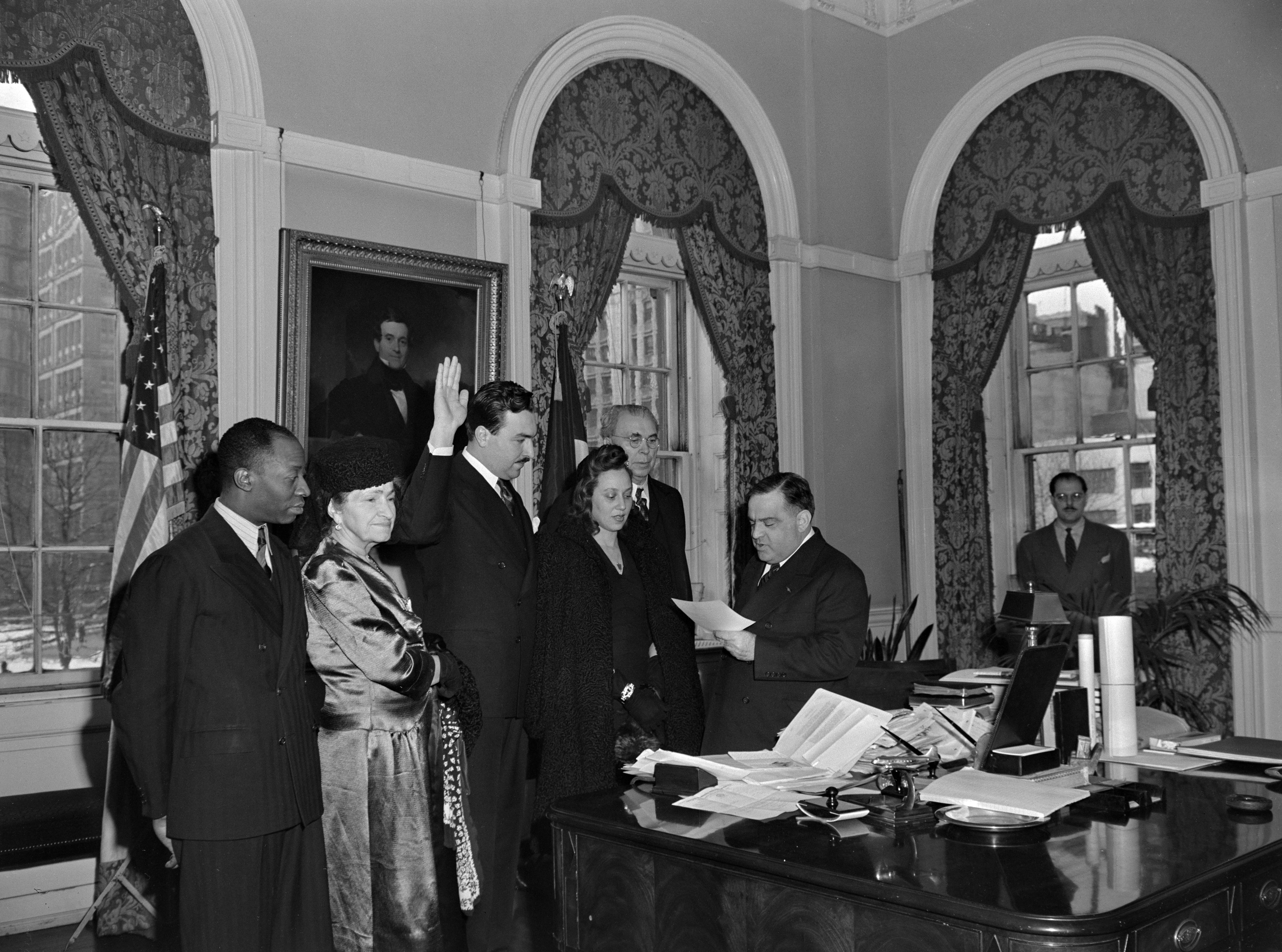
Powell's son Adam is sworn in as the first African American member of the New York City Council by mayor Fiorello La Guardia, January 5, 1942. (L-R): Joseph E. Ford, Mattie Shaffer Powell, Adam Clayton Powell Jr., Isabel Washington Powell, Adam Clayton Powell Sr., Fiorello La Guardia.

On 30 June 1889, Powell married Mattie Shaffer (née Mattie Buster) of Pratt, West Virginia. She was the daughter of Samuel Buster and his wife Eliza (née Wilson), both mixed-race farm laborers. (Eliza changed her and her daughter's surname to Shaffer after divorcing Buster.) The Powells had two children: Blanche F. Powell (b. 1898; d. 1926) and Adam Clayton Powell Jr. (b. 1908; d. 1972). Before 1920, Blanche married Clarence D. King, who had migrated to New York from Virginia, and the young couple lived with her parents for a time in the city. Mattie Powell died on April 22, 1945. Adam Clayton Powell, Sr. married his second wife, Inez Cottrell, on February 5, 1946. They lived on Sugar Hill in West Harlem at The Garrison Apartments, 435 Convent Avenue, Apartment 3.

== Career ==
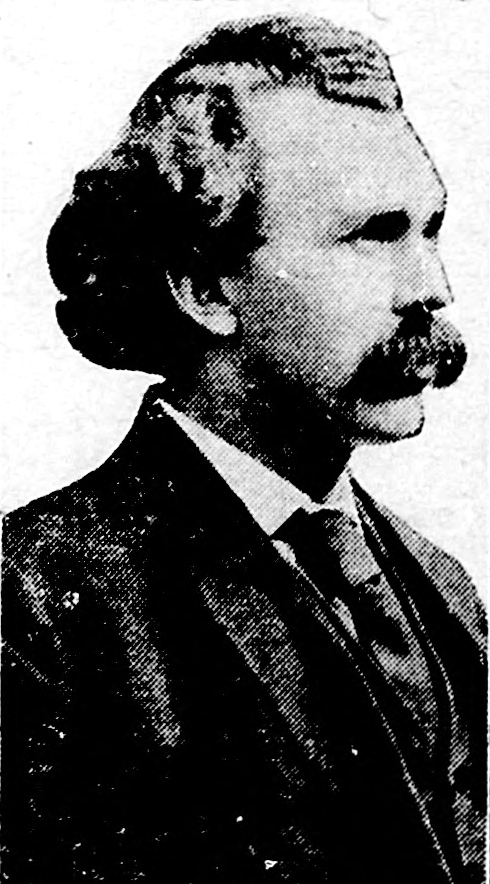
Powell c. 1910

Powell was ordained a Baptist minister in 1892; he served at churches in Philadelphia, Pennsylvania, and New Haven, Connecticut, between 1892 and 1908.

From 1908 until 1936, Powell served as pastor of the century-old Abyssinian Baptist Church, whose congregation had moved north and was located in Harlem, New York. Under his leadership, in 1920 the congregation acquired a large lot and built a substantial church and community center at a cost of $334,000. With the increase in the black population to New York during the twentieth century's Great Migration, Powell ultimately attracted a membership of 10,000 at Abyssinian, the largest Protestant membership in the country.

Powell had widespread influence in the community. Dietrich Bonhoeffer, the German theologian and pastor, attended Abyssinian Baptist for six months while studying in New York at Union Theological Seminary before World War II. He was greatly influenced by the preaching, social work and the Black spiritual music of the congregation. Adam Clayton Powell Sr. has been credited with teaching Bonhoeffer about love of enemies, resisting systems of injustice, Christ's presence with the poor, and the doctrine of "cheap grace".

Powell was active in a variety of educational institutions and community organizations; he was among the founders of the National Urban League; a trustee of Virginia Union University, Downington Industrial and Agricultural School in Pennsylvania, which operated until 1993; the National Training School for Women and Girls in Washington, DC; and the White Rose Industrial Home in New York, all historically black colleges and schools. He was a member of the YMCA, Republican Party, and fraternal organizations, including the Masons, Odd Fellows and Knights of Pythias.

Powell's son, Adam Clayton Powell Jr., succeeded his father as pastor at the church in 1937 after working with him for several years as an assistant.

== Burial ==
Powell is buried at Flushing Cemetery, Flushing, Queens, New York City, New York.

== See also ==
- Dietrich Bonhoeffer
- Frederick Douglass Memorial Park, board member
- List of people from Harlem

== Works ==
- Powell, A. Clayton Sr., Against the Tide: An Autobiography, (New York: Richard B. Smith, 1938)

=== Pamphlets ===
- "Some Rights Not Denied the Negro"
- "The Significance of the Hour"
- "A Plea for Strong Manhood"
- "A Three-Fold Cord"

== Sources ==
- De La Torre, M.A. (2015). Liberating Jonah: Forming an Ethics of Reconciliation. Orbis Books. ISBN 978-1608333431.
- Dorrien, G. (2015). The New Abolition: W. E. B. Du Bois and the Black Social Gospel. Yale University Press. ISBN 978-0300216332.
- Powell, A. Clayton Sr., Against the Tide: An Autobiography, (New York: Richard B. Smith, 1938)
- Rushing, Lawrence, "The Racial Identity of Adam Clayton Powell Jr.: A Case Study in Racial Ambivalence and Redefinition", Afro-Americans in New York Life and History, 1 January 2010
- Finkelman, Paul (editor). Encyclopedia of African American History, 1896 to the Present: From the Age of Segregation to the Twenty-first Century.
- Hamilton, Charles V. Adam Clayton Powell Jr.: The Political Biography of an American Dilemma, New York: Atheneum, Macmillan Publishing Company, 1991
- Haygood, Wil. King of the Cats: The Life and Times of Adam Clayton Powell Jr., 1993; reprint, HarperCollins, 2006
- Marsh, C. (2014). Strange Glory: A Life of Dietrich Bonhoeffer. Vintage Books. Alfred A. Knopf. ISBN 978-0307390387.
- Mather, Frank Lincoln. Who's Who of the Colored Race: A General Biographical Dictionary of Men and Women of African Descent, Vol. 1, Chicago: Memento Edition, 1915, p. 222
- Pezzoni, J. Daniel. "Hook-Powell-Moorman Farm": Historic Nomination Form, US Department of the Interior, 1995
- Yenser, Thomas (editor), Who's Who in Colored America: A Biographical Dictionary of Notable Living Persons of African Descent in America, Who's Who in Colored America, Brooklyn, New York, 1930–1931–1932 (Third Edition)
- The story of the Powell family is retold in the 1949 radio drama "Father to Son", a presentation from Destination Freedom, written by Richard Durham
