= Isabel Washington Powell =

American dancer and actress (1908–2007)

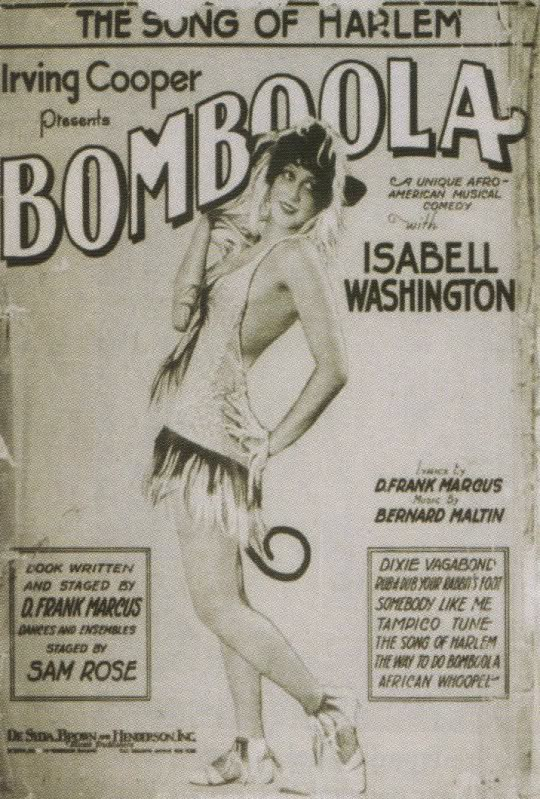
- Washington featured on a poster for Irving Cooper's "Bomboola," 1929
- Born: Isabel Geraldine Washington; May 23, 1908; Savannah, Georgia, U.S.
- Died: May 1, 2007 (aged 98); New York City, NY, U.S.
- Spouses: Preston Webster; Adam Clayton Powell Jr. (m. 1933–1945)

Isabel "Belle" Geraldine Washington Powell (May 23, 1908 – May 1, 2007) was a dancer, showgirl, and actress during the Harlem Renaissance. She was the first wife of Adam Clayton Powell Jr., and after their divorce, she went on to work in the Harlem public school system.

== Biography ==
Isabel Washington, who was of African American heritage, was born May 23, 1908, in Savannah, Georgia. Raised in Savannah, she lived with her parents, Harriet (Hattie) Walker Ward Washington, a dancer, and Robert T. Washington, a postal worker, as well as her four brothers and four sisters. After their mother died, she and her older sister Fredi were sent to school at St. Elizabeth's Convent in Cornwell Heights, Pennsylvania. Powell later moved to New York to live with Fredi, who later became well-known as an actress.

Following her sister into show business, Washington became a dancer and showgirl at various New York nightclubs, as well as acting on the Broadway stage. In 1929 she played the “other woman” in Bessie Smith’s only film, St. Louis Blues.

Washington's first marriage was to photographer Preston Webster. They had one son together, Preston, Jr (later Preston Powell).

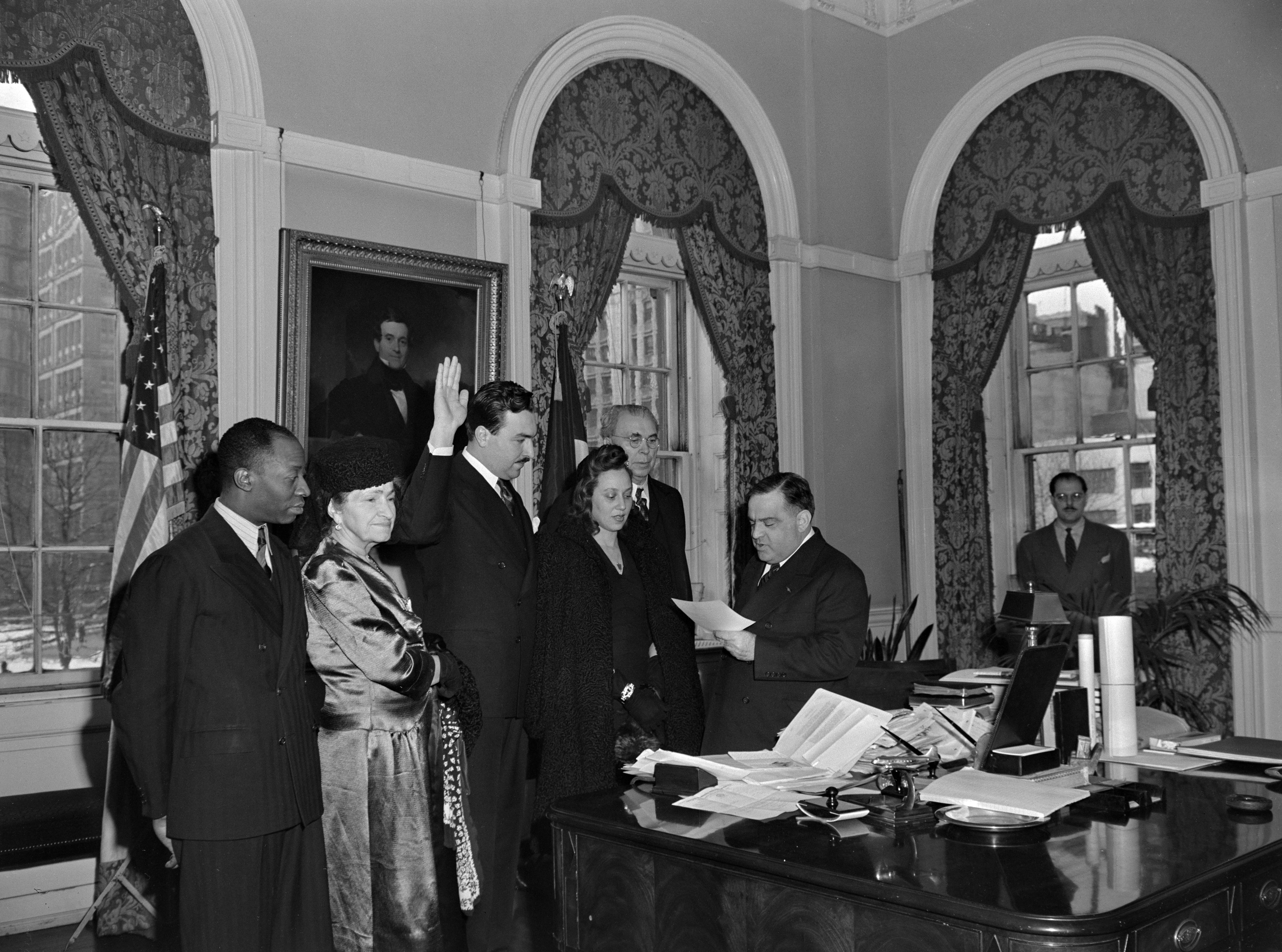
Washington's husband Adam Clayton Powell Jr. is sworn in as the first African American member of the New York City Council by mayor Fiorello La Guardia, January 5, 1942. (L-R): Joseph E. Ford, Mattie Shaffer Powell, Adam Clayton Powell Jr., Isabel Washington Powell, Adam Clayton Powell Sr., Fiorello La Guardia.

While dancing at the Cotton Club, Washington met Reverend Adam Clayton Powell Jr. The two were married in 1933 at the Abyssinian Baptist Church, where Adam Clayton Powell Sr. served as minister. Powell's father objected to the marriage, as Washington was Catholic, but she converted and the wedding drew 3,000 spectators.

Isabel Powell assisted her husband in his early career, during which he was elected to New York City Council, became the senior minister at the Abyssinian Baptist Church, and in 1944, he was elected to the United States House of Representatives. In 1937 the couple purchased a house in the Highlands section of Oak Bluffs, Massachusetts, an African-American community in Martha's Vineyard. They were married from 1933 until 1945, when Powell, a Baptist minister, left her for his second wife.

After her divorce, Powell became a special education teacher. She divided her time between Harlem and Martha's Vineyard. Powell died on May 1, 2007, in Harlem, New York.
