= Adam Clayton Powell Jr. =

American pastor and politician (1908–1972)

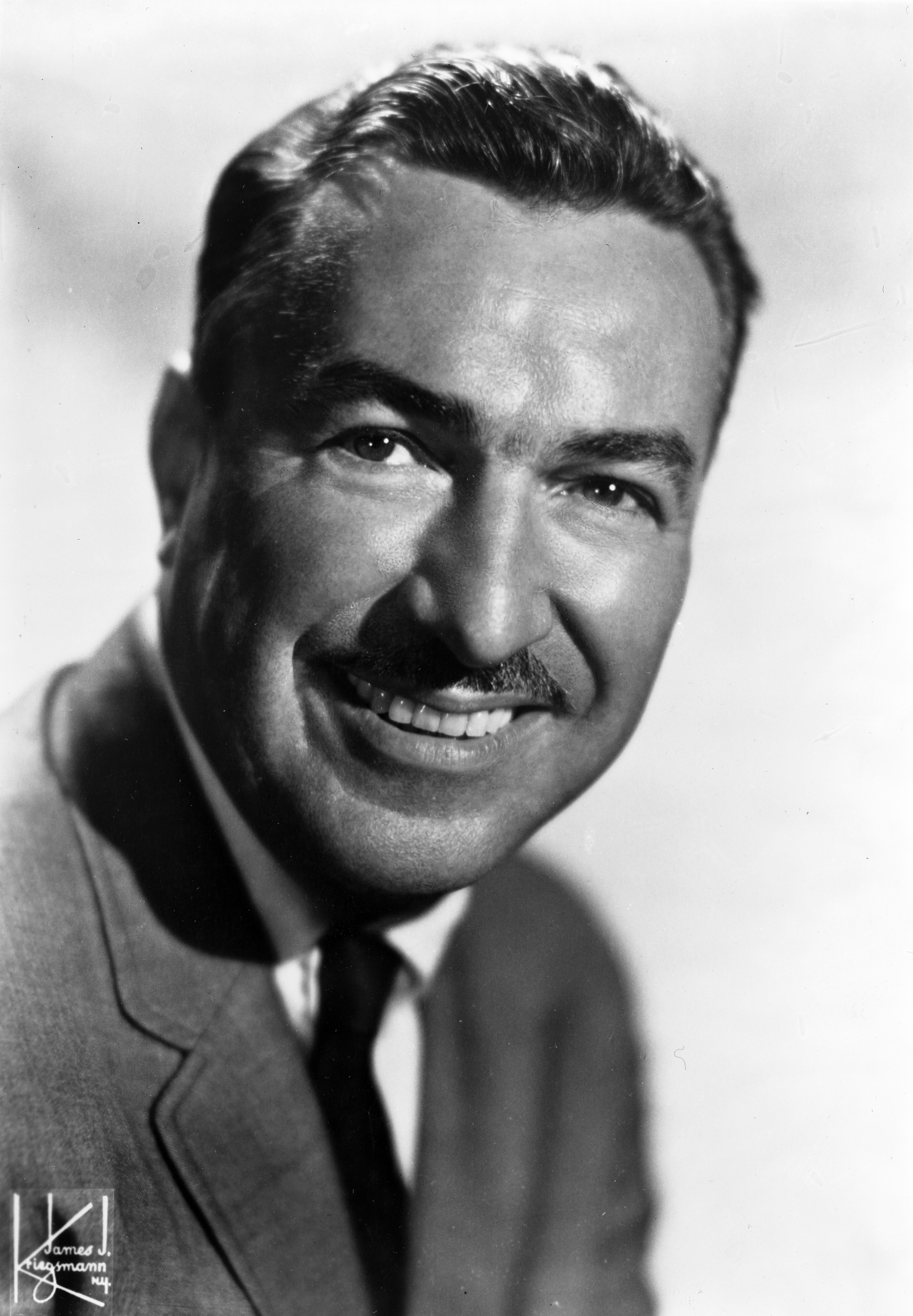

Member of the U.S. House of Representatives from New York
- In office January 3, 1945 – January 3, 1971
- Preceded by: Walter A. Lynch
- Succeeded by: Charles Rangel
- Constituency: 22nd district (1945–1953); 16th district (1953–1963); 18th district (1963–1971)

Member of the New York City Council from Manhattan's at-large district
- In office January 1, 1942 – December 31, 1943
- Preceded by: Multi-member district
- Succeeded by: Benjamin J. Davis

Personal details
- Born: November 29, 1908 New Haven, Connecticut, U.S.
- Died: April 4, 1972 (aged 63) Miami, Florida, U.S.
- Party: Democratic
- Other political affiliations: American Labor; City Fusion
- Spouses: Isabel Washington (m. 1933; div. 1945); Hazel Scott (m. 1945; div. 1960); Yvette Flores Diago (m. 1960; sep. 1965)
- Children: Adam, AC, 1 adopted
- Parent: Adam Clayton Powell Sr. (father)
- Education: City College of New York (attended); Colgate University (BA); Columbia University (MA); Shaw University (DDiv)

Adam Clayton Powell Jr. (November 29, 1908 – April 4, 1972) was an American Baptist pastor and politician who represented the Harlem neighborhood of New York City in the United States House of Representatives from 1945 until 1971. He was the first African American to be elected to Congress from New York, as well as the first from any state in the Northeast. Re-elected for nearly three decades, Powell became a powerful national politician of the Democratic Party, and served as a national spokesman on civil rights and social issues. He also urged United States presidents to support emerging nations in Africa and Asia as they gained independence after colonialism.

In 1961, after 16 years in the House, Powell became chairman of the Education and Labor Committee, the most powerful position held by an African American in Congress to that date. As chairman, he supported the passage of important social and civil rights legislation under presidents John F. Kennedy and Lyndon B. Johnson. Following allegations of corruption, in 1967 Powell was excluded from his seat by Democratic Representatives-elect of the 90th United States Congress, but he was re-elected and regained the seat in the 1969 ruling by the Supreme Court of the United States in Powell v. McCormack. He lost his seat in 1970 to Charles Rangel and retired from electoral politics.

== Early life and education ==
Powell was born in 1908 in New Haven, Connecticut, the second child and only son of Adam Clayton Powell Sr. and Mattie Buster Shaffer, born poor in Virginia and West Virginia, respectively. His sister, Blanche, was 10 years older. His parents were of mixed race with African and European ancestry and, according to his father, American Indian on his mother's side. In his autobiography Adam by Adam, Powell says that his mother had partial German ancestry. They and their ancestors were classified as mulatto in 19th-century censuses. Powell's paternal grandmother's ancestors had been free persons of color for generations before the Civil War. By 1908, Powell Sr. had become a prominent Baptist minister, serving as a pastor in Philadelphia, and as lead pastor at a Baptist church in New Haven.

Powell Sr. had worked his way out of poverty and through Wayland Seminary, a historically black college, and postgraduate study at Yale University and Virginia Theological Seminary. In the year of his son's birth in New Haven, Powell Sr. was called as the pastor of the Abyssinian Baptist Church in the Harlem neighborhood of New York City. He led the church for decades through major expansion, including fundraising for and the construction of an addition to accommodate the increased membership of the congregation during the years of the Great Migration, as many African Americans moved north from the South. That congregation grew to a community of 10,000 people.

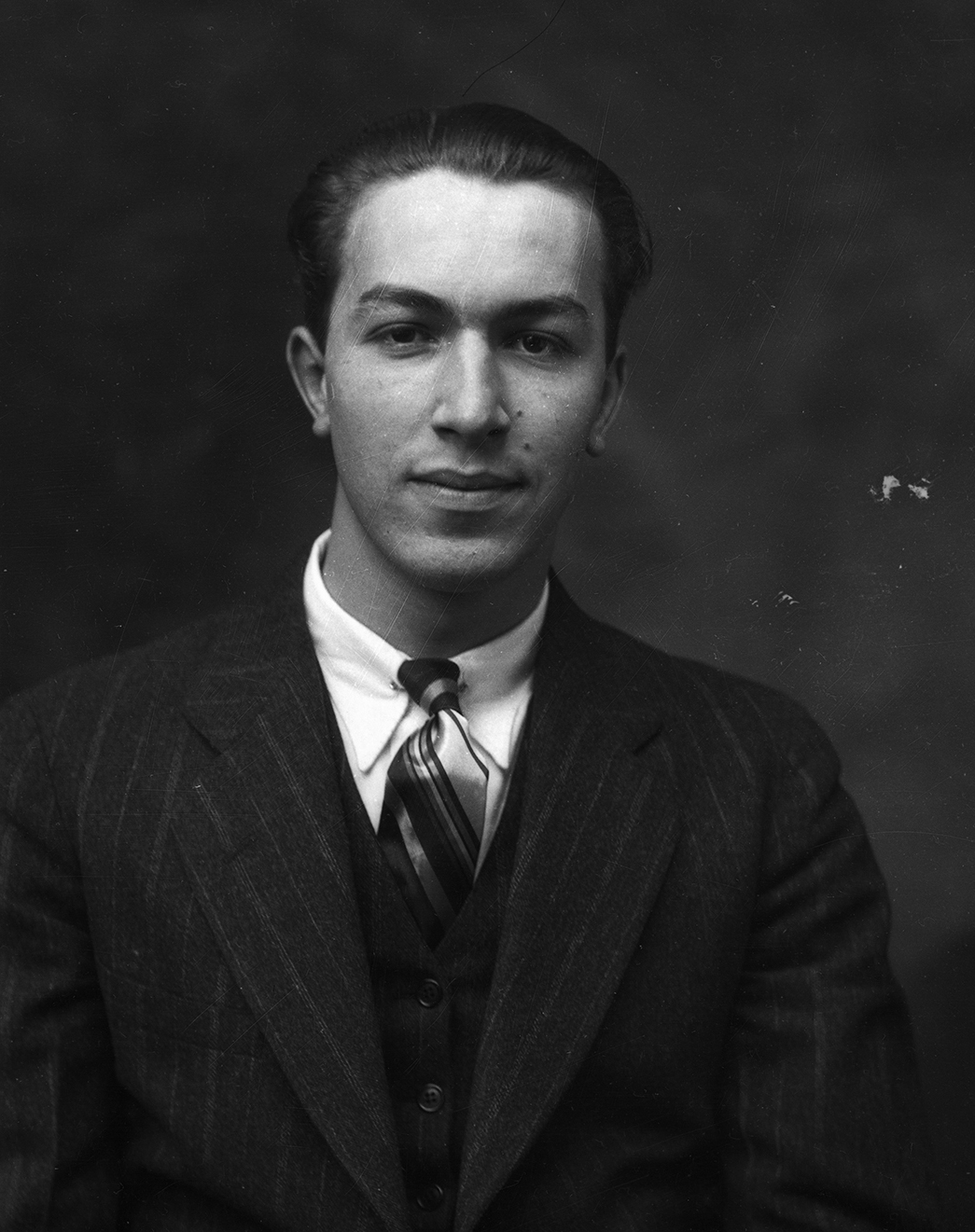
Powell's Colgate University portrait c. 1930

Due to his father's achievements, Powell grew up in a wealthy household in New York City. Because of some of his European ancestry, Adam was born with hazel eyes, light skin and blond hair, such that he could pass for white. However, he did not play with that racial ambiguity until college. He attended Townsend Harris High School, then studied at City College of New York before starting at Colgate University as a freshman. The four other African American students at Colgate at the time were all athletes. For a time, Powell briefly passed as white, using his appearance to escape racial strictures at college. The other black students were dismayed to discover what he had done. Encouraged by his father to become a minister, Powell became more serious about his studies at Colgate, where he earned his bachelor's degree in 1930. After returning to New York, Powell began his graduate work and in 1931 earned an M.A. in religious education from Columbia University. He became a member of Alpha Phi Alpha, the first African-American, intercollegiate Greek-lettered fraternity.

Later, apparently trying to bolster his black identity, Powell would say that his paternal grandparents were born into slavery. However, his paternal grandmother, Sally Dunning, was at least the third generation of free people of color in her family. In the 1860 census, she is listed as a free mulatto, as were her mother, grandmother, and siblings. Sally never identified the father of Adam Clayton Powell Sr., born in 1865. She appeared to have named her son after her older brother Adam Dunning, listed on the 1860 census as a farmer and the head of their household. In 1867, Sally Dunning married Anthony Bush, a mulatto freedman. All the family members were listed under the surname Dunning in the 1870 census.

The family changed its surname to Powell when they moved to Kanawha County, West Virginia, as part of their new life there. According to Charles V. Hamilton, a 1991 biographer of Powell, Anthony Bush "decided to take the name Powell as a new identity", and this is how they were recorded in the 1880 census.

Adam Jr.'s mother, Mattie Buster Shaffer, was African-American with possibly some German ancestry. Her parents had been slaves in Virginia and were freed after the Civil War. Powell's parents married in West Virginia, where they met. Numerous freedmen had migrated there in the late 19th century for work.

In Harlem, Adam Clayton Powell Jr. lived on Sugar Hill at The Garrison Apartments, 435 Convent Avenue, Apartment 3, which had also been his father's home until his death in 1953.

== Early career ==
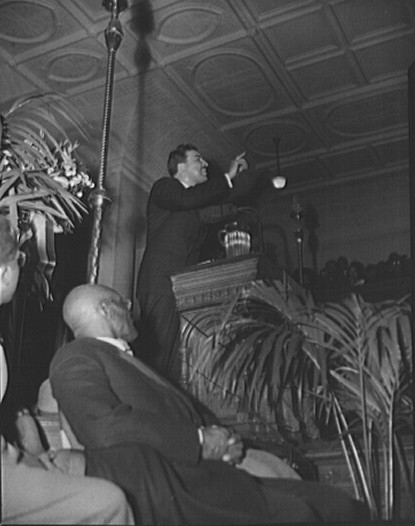
Powell addressing a citizens' committee mass meeting, November 1942

After ordination, Powell began assisting his father with charitable services at the church and as a preacher. He greatly increased the volume of meals and clothing provided to the needy, and began to learn more about the lives of the working class and poor in Harlem.

During the Great Depression in the 1930s, Powell, a handsome and charismatic figure, became a civil rights leader in Harlem. He recounted these experiences in a 1964 interview with Robert Penn Warren for the book Who Speaks for the Negro?. He developed a formidable public following in the community through his crusades for jobs and affordable housing. As chairman of the Coordinating Committee for Employment, Powell used numerous methods of community organizing to bring political pressure on major businesses to open their doors to black employees at professional levels. He organized mass meetings, rent strikes, and public campaigns to force companies, utilities, and Harlem Hospital, which operated in the community, to hire black workers at skill levels higher than the lowest positions, to which they had formerly been restricted by informal discrimination.

For instance, during the 1939 New York World's Fair, Powell organized a picket line at the Fair's offices in the Empire State Building. As a result, the Fair hired more black employees, increasing their numbers from about 200 to 732. In 1941, Powell led a bus boycott in Harlem, where blacks constituted the majority of passengers but held few of the jobs; the New York City Transit Authority hired 200 black workers and set the precedent for more. Powell also led a fight to have drugstores operating in Harlem hire black pharmacists. He encouraged local residents to shop only where blacks were also hired to work. "Mass action is the most powerful force on earth", Powell once said, adding, "As long as it is within the law, it's not wrong; if the law is wrong, change the law".

In 1937, Powell succeeded his father as pastor of the Abyssinian Baptist Church. Powell Jr. remained pastor of the church until 1972.

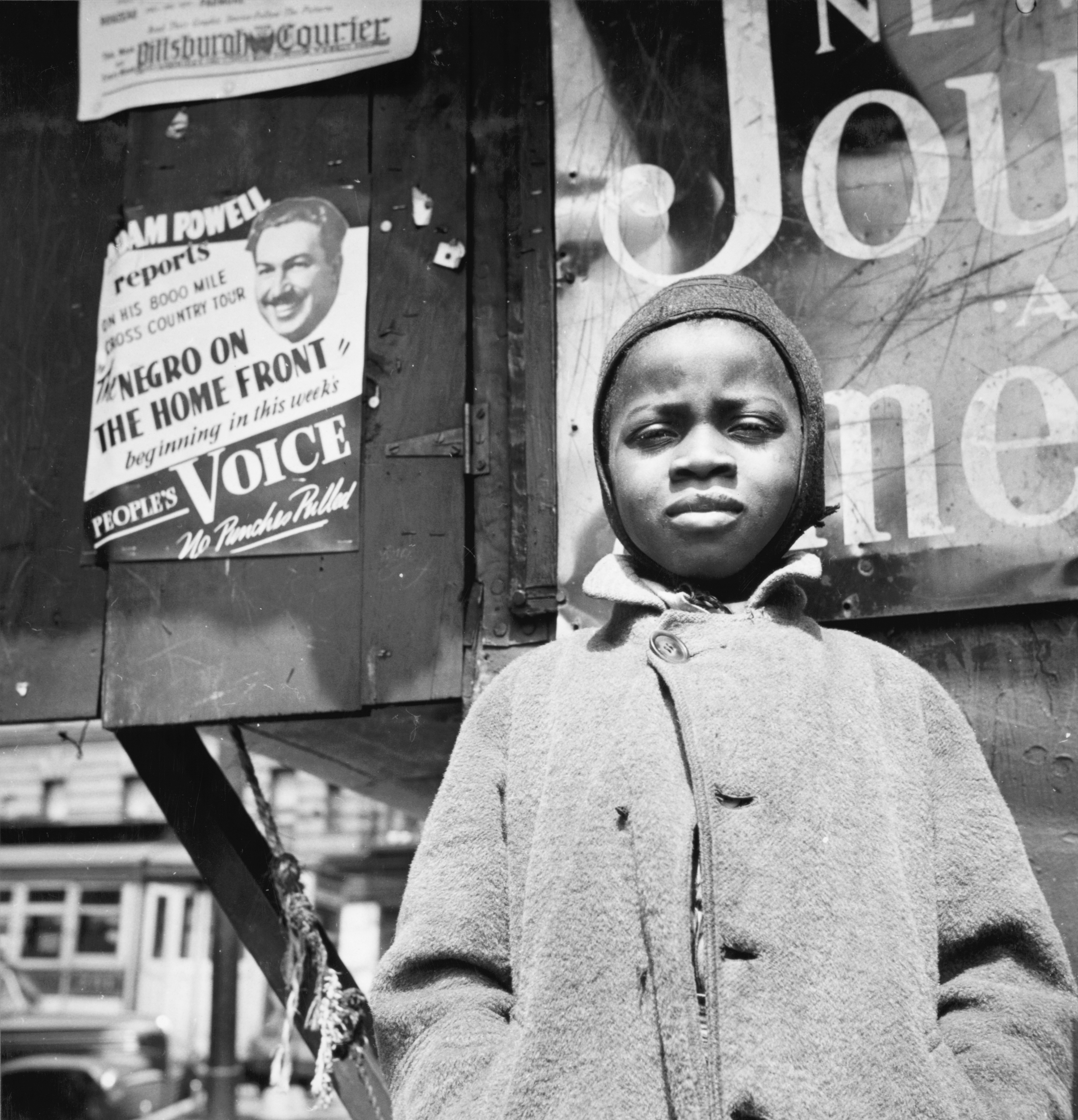
A Harlem newsboy stands next to a flyer for People's Voice, May 1943

In 1942 he founded People's Voice, a newspaper designed for "a progressive African American audience, and it educated and enlightened readers on everything from local gatherings and events to U.S. civil rights issues to the political and economic struggles of the peoples of Africa. Reporters and writers for the papers included influential African Americans such as Powell himself, Powell's sister-in-law and actress Fredi Washington, and journalist Marvel Cooke." It also served as a mouthpiece for his views. After he was elected to Congress in 1944, other people led the paper, but it finally closed in 1948, after being accused of communist connections.

== Political career ==
=== New York City Council ===
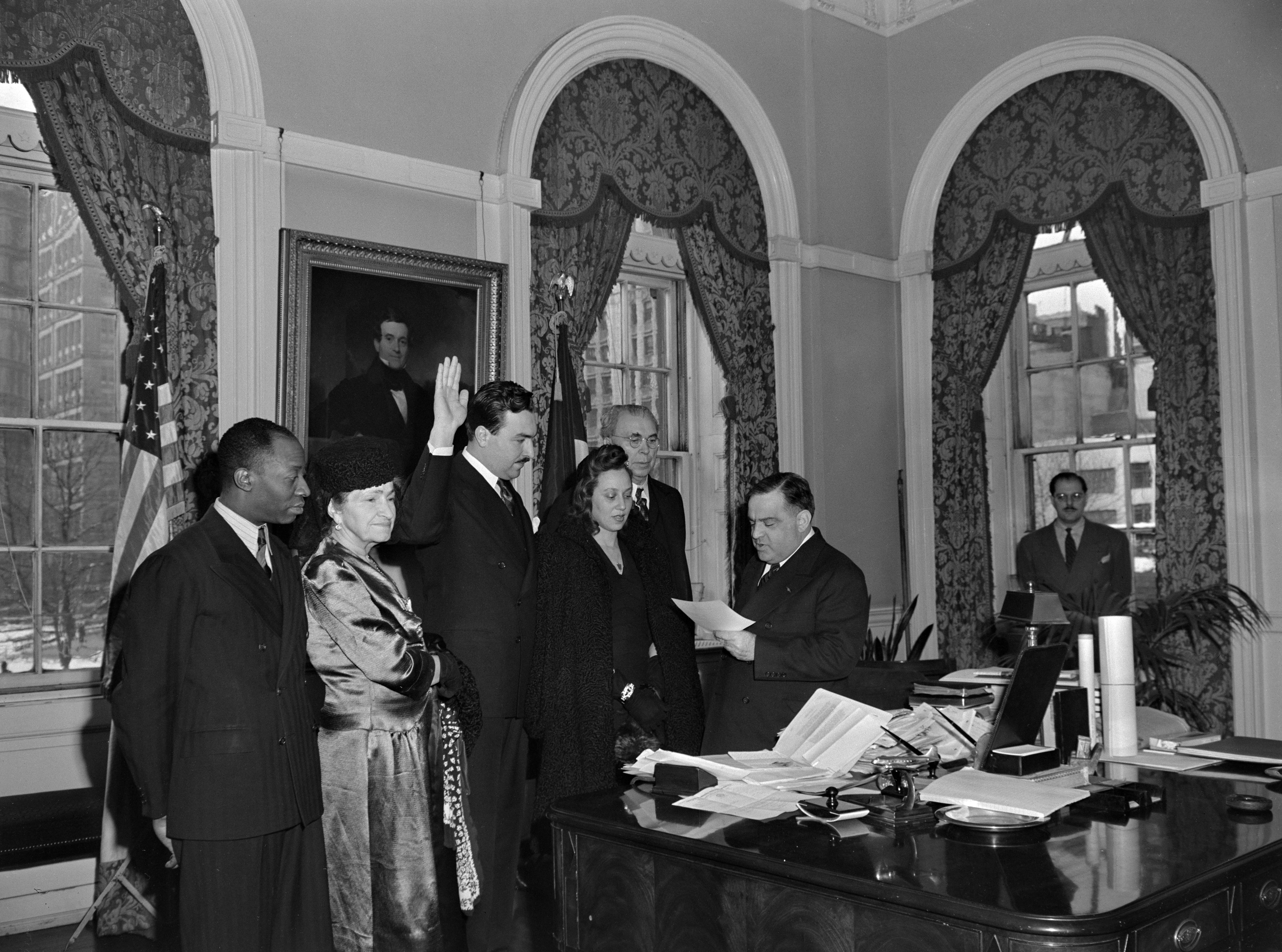
Powell is sworn in as the first African American member of the New York City Council by mayor Fiorello La Guardia, January 5, 1942. (L-R): Joseph E. Ford, Mattie Shaffer Powell, Adam Clayton Powell Jr., Isabel Washington Powell, Adam Clayton Powell Sr., Fiorello La Guardia.

In 1941, with the aid of New York City's use of the single transferable vote, Powell was elected to the New York City Council as the city's first black Council member. (Note: African Americans had previously been elected to the Board of Aldermen; the first were Charles H. Roberts and George W. Harris in 1919.) He received 65,736 votes, the third-best total among the six successful Council candidates, running on the City Fusion and American Labor Party ballot lines. During his tenure, he fought for the city to hire more black policemen and teachers, and to build more schools and playgrounds in black neighborhoods. In 1943, he called for mayor Fiorello La Guardia to be impeached for approving the segregated Stuyvesant Town housing development. After the State Legislature drew New York's 22nd congressional district to be majority-black, Powell declined to run for reelection in 1943 so he could prepare for a congressional campaign. He endorsed black Communist Benjamin J. Davis Jr. to succeed him.

=== Congress ===
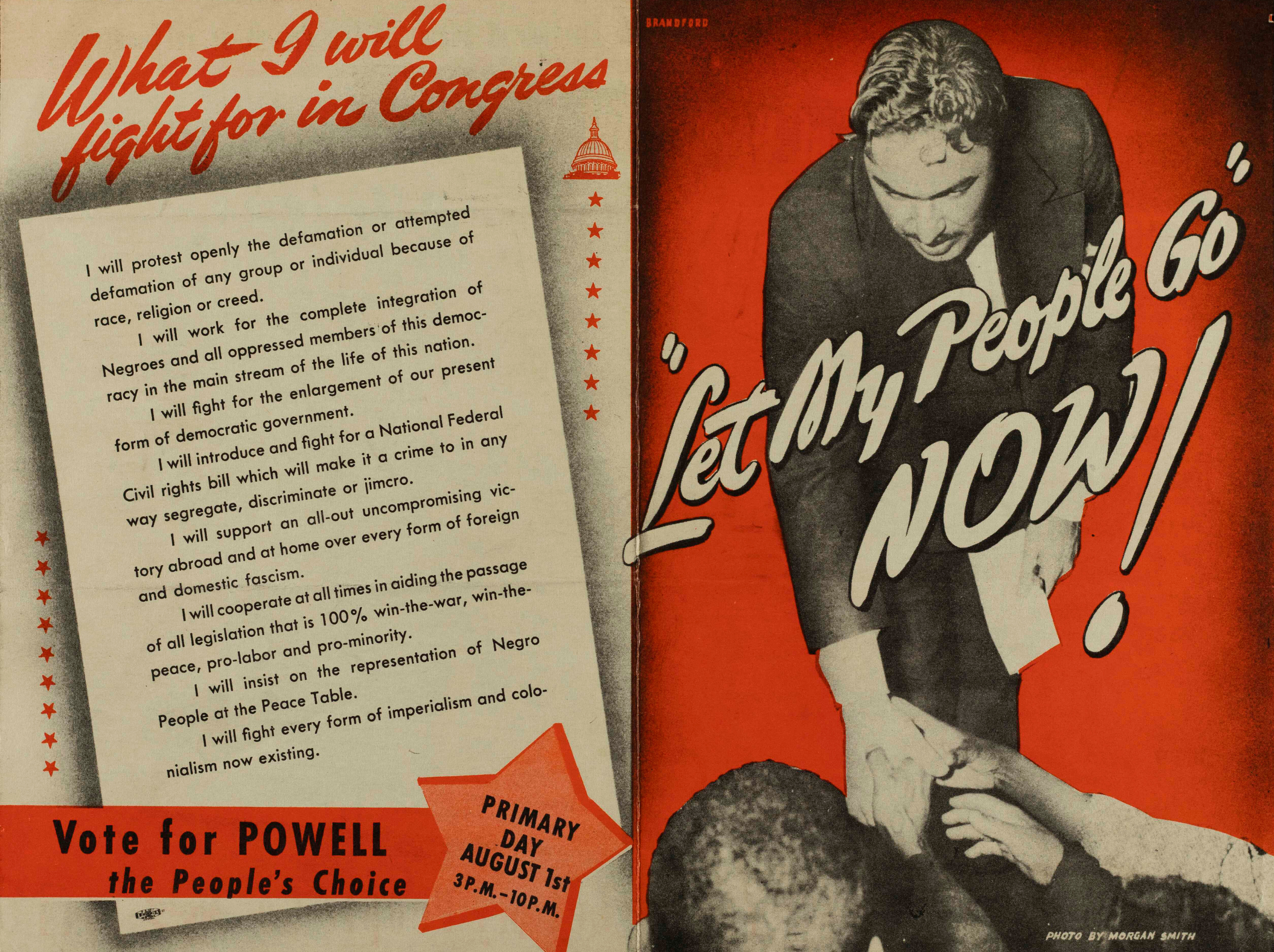
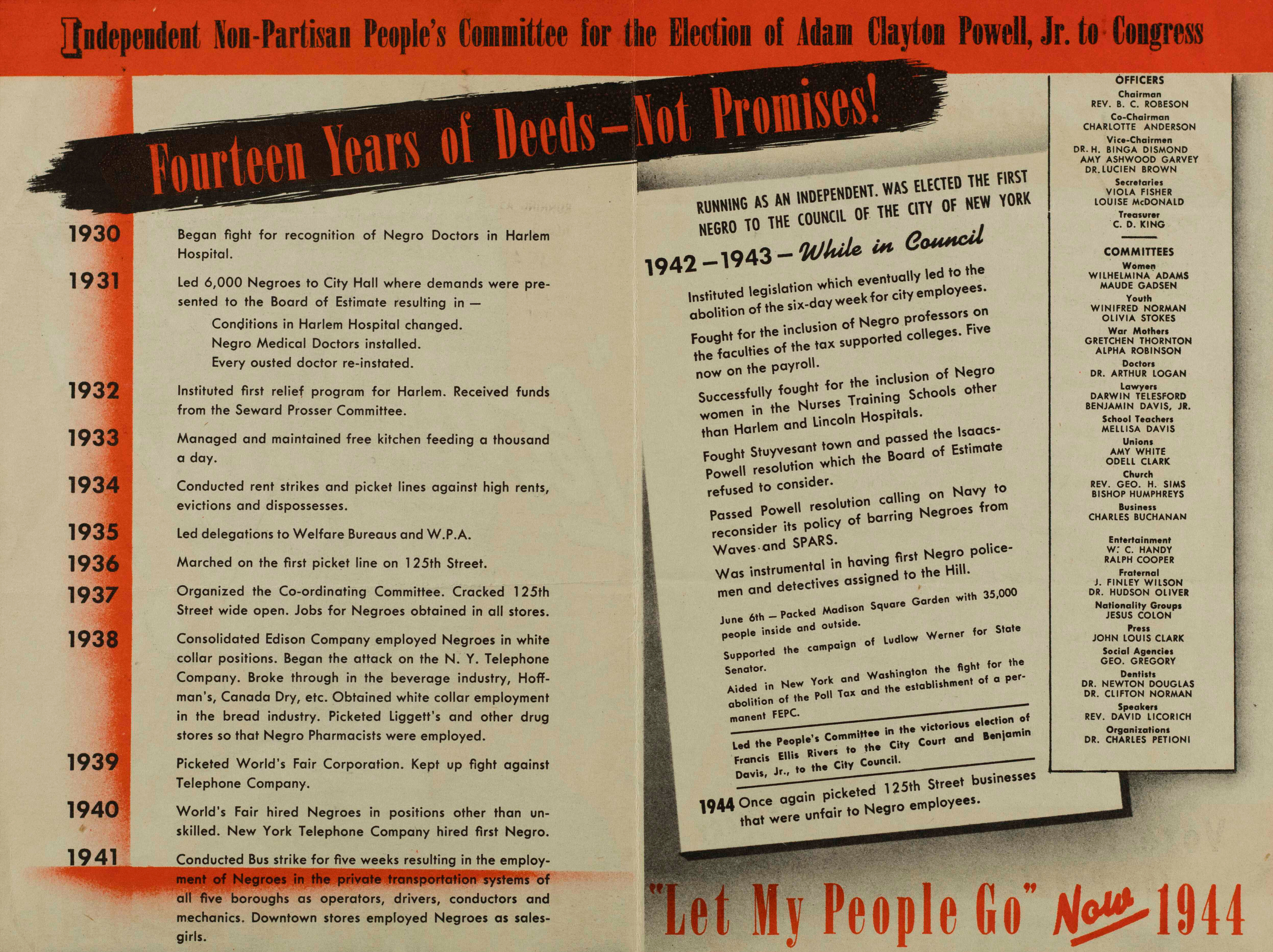
"'Let My People Go' NOW!," a pamphlet produced by the "Independent Non-Partisan People's Committee for the Election of Adam Clayton Powell, Jr. to Congress" to promote Powell's congressional candidacy, 1944

In 1944, Powell ran for the United States Congress on a platform of civil rights for African Americans: support for "fair employment practices, and a ban on poll taxes and lynching." Requiring poll taxes for voter registration and voting was a device used by southern states in new constitutions adopted from 1890 to 1908 to disenfranchise most blacks and many poor whites, to exclude them from politics. Poll taxes in the United States, together with the social and economic intimidation of Jim Crow laws, were maintained in the South into the 1960s to keep blacks excluded from politics and politically powerless. Although often associated with states of the former Confederate States of America, poll taxes were also in place in some northern and western states, including California, Connecticut, Maine, Massachusetts, Minnesota, New Hampshire, Ohio, Pennsylvania, Vermont and Wisconsin.

Powell was elected as a Democrat and defeated Republican candidate Sara Pelham Speaks to represent the Congressional District that included Harlem. He was the first black Congressman elected from New York State.

As the historian Charles V. Hamilton wrote in his 1992 political biography of Powell,

Here was a person who [in the 1940s] would at least 'speak out.' ... That would be different ... Many Negroes were angry that no Northern liberals would get up on the floor of Congress and challenge the segregationists. ... Powell certainly promised to do that ...

[In] the 1940s and 1950s, he was, indeed, virtually alone ... And precisely because of that, he was exceptionally crucial. In many instances during those earlier times, if he did not speak out, the issue would not have been raised. ... For example, only he could (or would dare to) challenge Congressman Rankin of Mississippi on the House floor in the 1940s for using the word "nigger". He certainly did not change Rankin's mind or behavior, but he gave solace to millions who longed for a little retaliatory defiance.

Powell was banned from the White House after calling President Truman's wife Bess Truman the "Last Lady of the Land" because she attended a reception for the Daughters of the American Revolution after the organization had refused to allow the black pianist Hazel Scott, Powell's wife, to perform at the DAR Constitution Hall and Truman's attendance was seen as an endorsement of this racism.

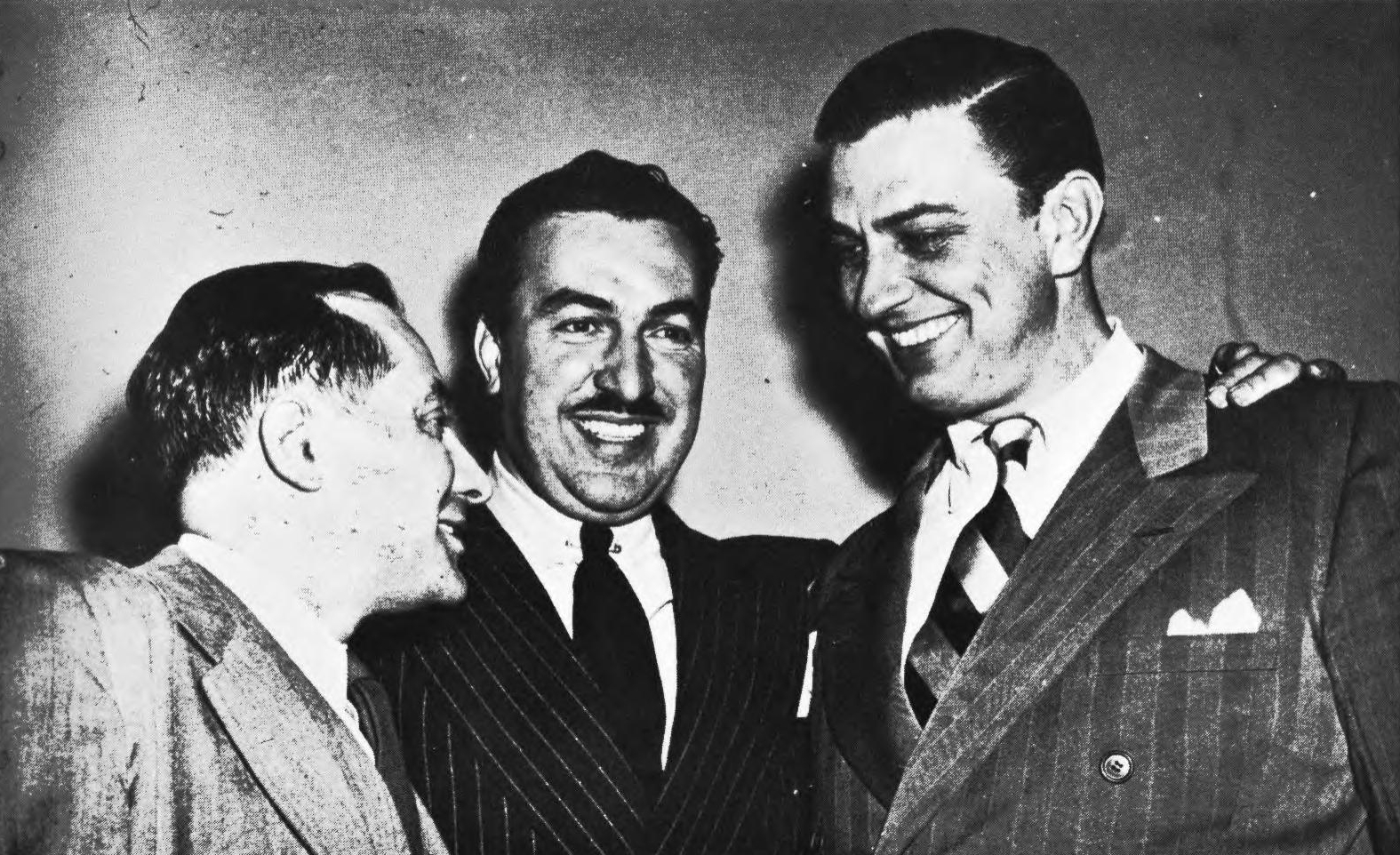
From left to right: Vito Marcantonio, Powell, and Franklin D. Roosevelt Jr., three congressmen unsuccessful in their attempt to save the Fair Employment Practice Committee, February 23, 1950

As one of only two black Congressmen (the other being William Levi Dawson) until 1955, Powell challenged the informal ban on black representatives using Capitol facilities previously reserved for white members. He took black constituents to dine with him in the "Whites Only" House restaurant. He clashed with the many segregationists from the South in his party.

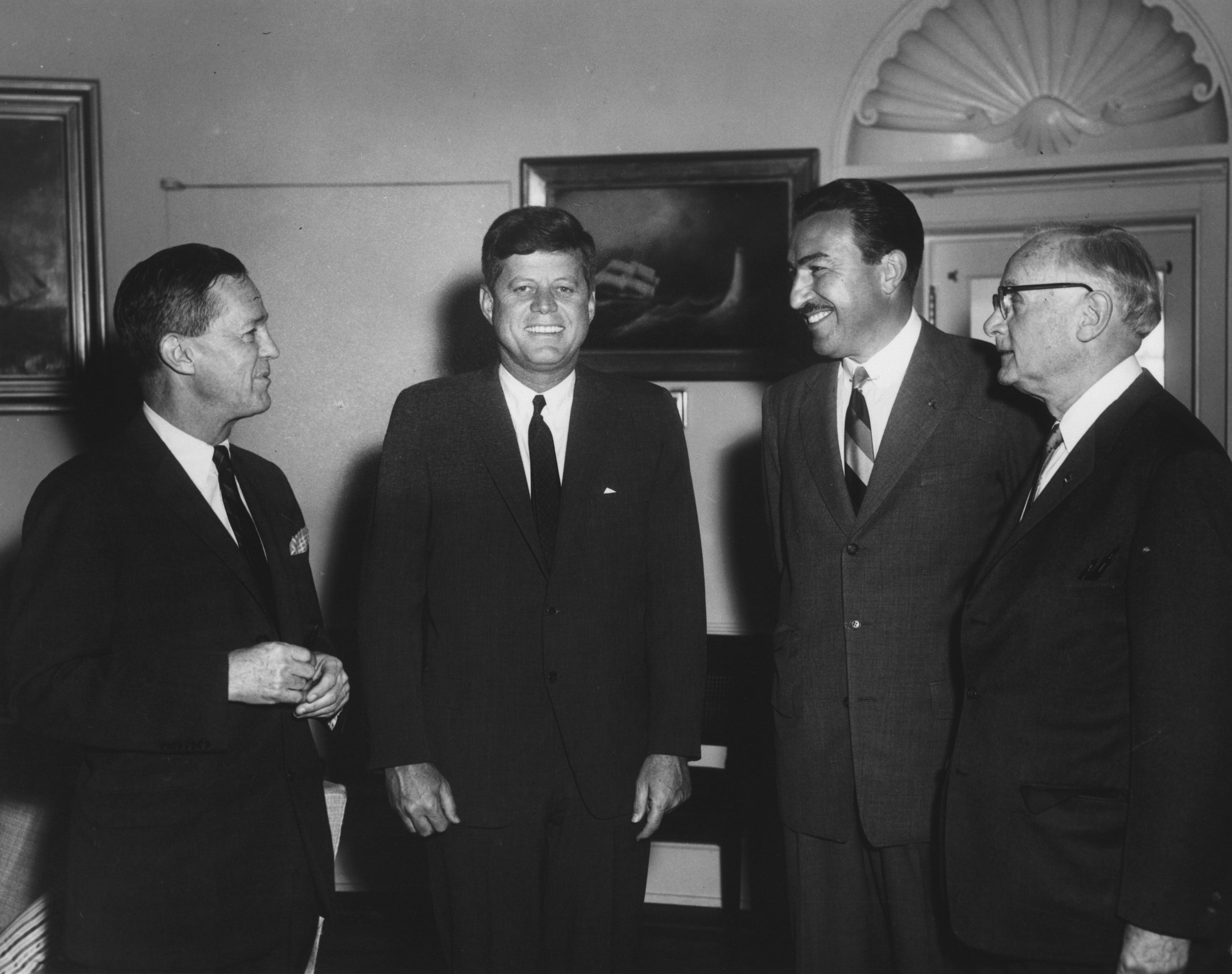
Powell with President John F. Kennedy, Joseph S. Clark Jr., and Elmer J. Holland, 1962

Powell worked closely with Clarence Mitchell Jr., the representative of the National Association for the Advancement of Colored People (NAACP) in Washington, D.C., to try to gain justice in federal programs. Biographer Hamilton described the NAACP as "the quarterback that threw the ball to Powell, who, to his credit, was more than happy to catch and run with it." He developed a strategy known as the "Powell Amendments". "On bill after bill that proposed federal expenditures, Powell would offer 'our customary amendment', requiring that federal funds be denied to any jurisdiction that maintained segregation; Liberals would be embarrassed, Southern politicians angered." This principle would later become integrated into Title VI of the Civil Rights Act of 1964.

Powell was also willing to act independently; in 1956, he broke party ranks and supported President Dwight D. Eisenhower for re-election, saying the civil rights plank in the Democratic Party platform was too weak. In 1958, he survived a determined effort by the Tammany Hall Democratic Party machine in New York to oust him in the primary election. In 1960, Powell, hearing of planned civil rights marches at the Democratic Convention, which could embarrass the party or candidate, threatened to accuse Rev. Martin Luther King Jr. of having a homosexual relationship with Bayard Rustin unless the marches were canceled. Rustin, one of King's political advisers, was an openly gay man. King agreed to cancel the planned events and Rustin resigned from the Southern Christian Leadership Conference.

=== Global work ===
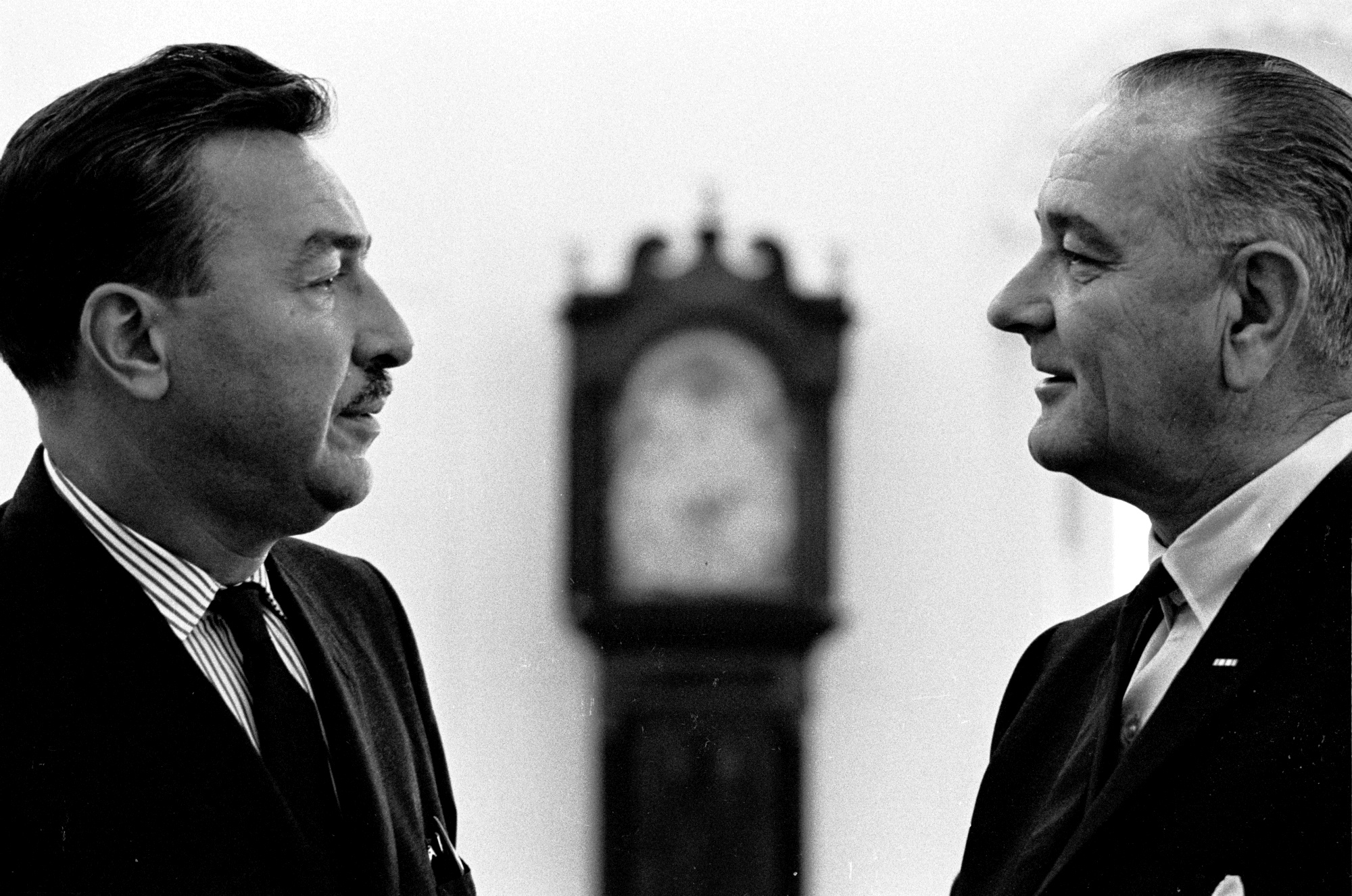
Powell with President Lyndon B. Johnson in the Oval Office, 1965

Powell also paid attention to the issues of developing nations in Africa and Asia, making trips overseas. He urged presidential policymakers to pay attention to nations seeking independence from colonial powers and support aid to them. During the Cold War, many of them sought neutrality between the United States and the Soviet Union. He made speeches on the House Floor to celebrate the anniversaries of the independence of nations such as Ghana, Indonesia, and Sierra Leone.

In 1955, against the State Department's advice, Powell attended the Asian–African Conference in Bandung, Indonesia, as an observer. He made a positive international impression in public addresses that balanced his concerns of his nation's race relations problems with a spirited defense of the United States as a whole against Communist criticisms. Powell returned to the United States to a warm bipartisan reception for his performance, and he was invited to meet with President Dwight D. Eisenhower.

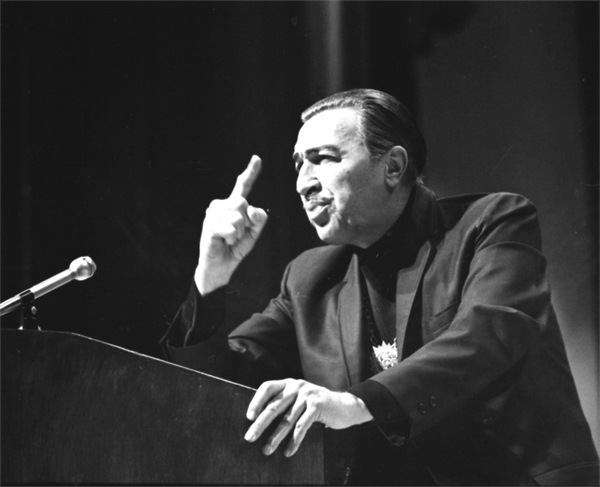
Powell speaking at a Human Rights Symposium, 1970

With this influence, Powell suggested to the State Department that the current manner of competing with the Soviet Union in the realm of fine arts such as international symphony orchestra and ballet company tours was ineffective. Instead, he advised that the United States should focus on the popular arts, such as sponsoring international tours of leading jazz musicians, which could draw attention to an indigenous American art form and featured musicians who often performed in mixed race bands. The State Department approved the idea. The first such tour with Dizzy Gillespie proved to be an outstanding success abroad and prompted similarly popular tours featuring other musicians for many years.

=== Committee chairmanship and legislation ===
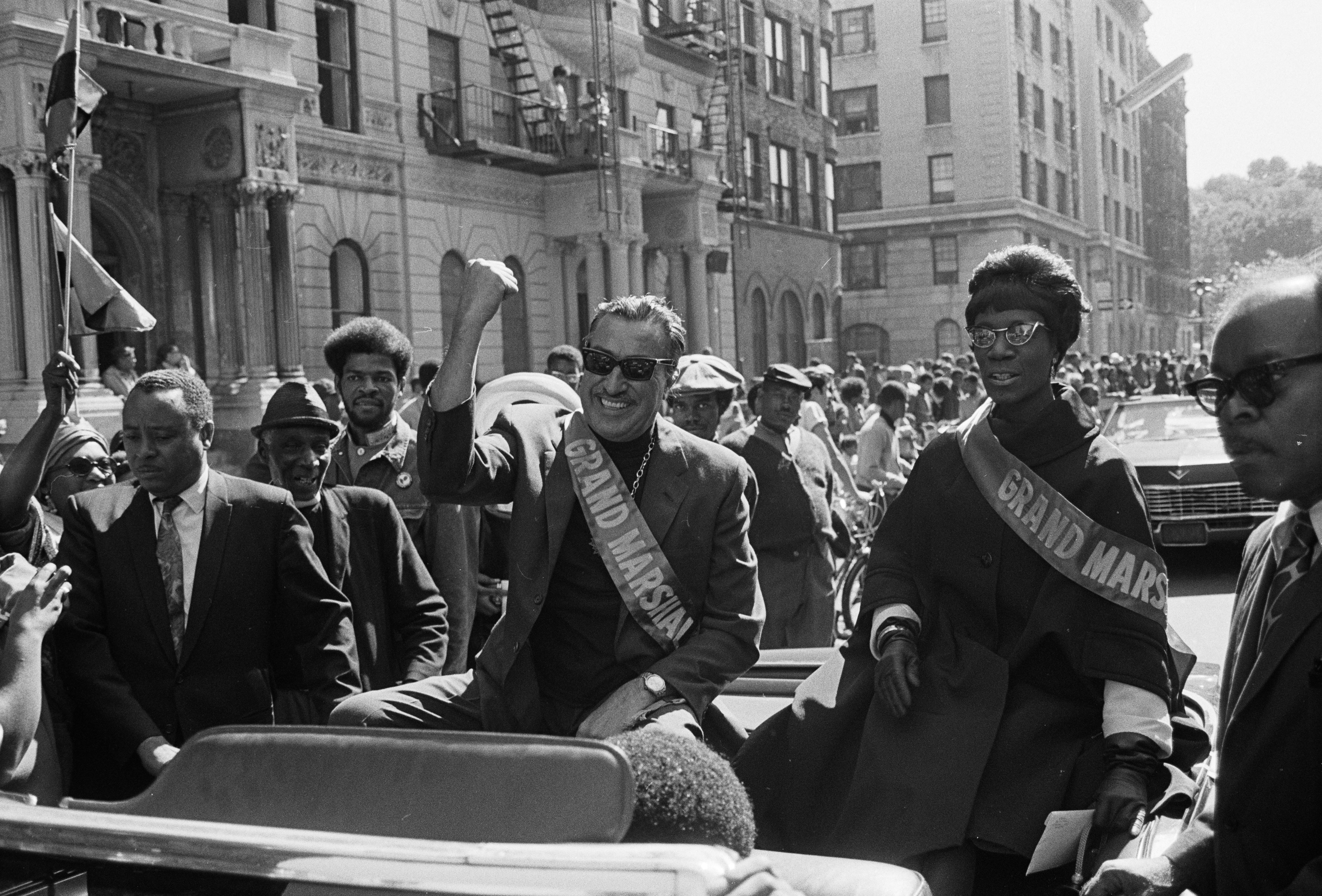
Powell and Shirley Chisholm serve as Grand Marshals of Harlem's first African American Day Parade, September 21, 1969

In 1961, after 15 years in Congress, Powell advanced to chairman of the powerful United States House Committee on Education and Labor. In this position, he presided over federal social programs for minimum wage and Medicaid (established later under Johnson); he expanded the minimum wage to include retail workers; and worked for equal pay for women; he supported education and training for the deaf, nursing education, and vocational training; he led legislation for standards for wages and work hours; as well as for aid for elementary and secondary education, and school libraries. Powell's committee proved extremely effective in enacting major parts of President Kennedy's "New Frontier" and President Johnson's "Great Society" social programs and the War on Poverty. It successfully reported to Congress "49 pieces of bedrock legislation", as President Johnson put it in a May 18, 1966, letter congratulating Powell on the fifth anniversary of his chairmanship.

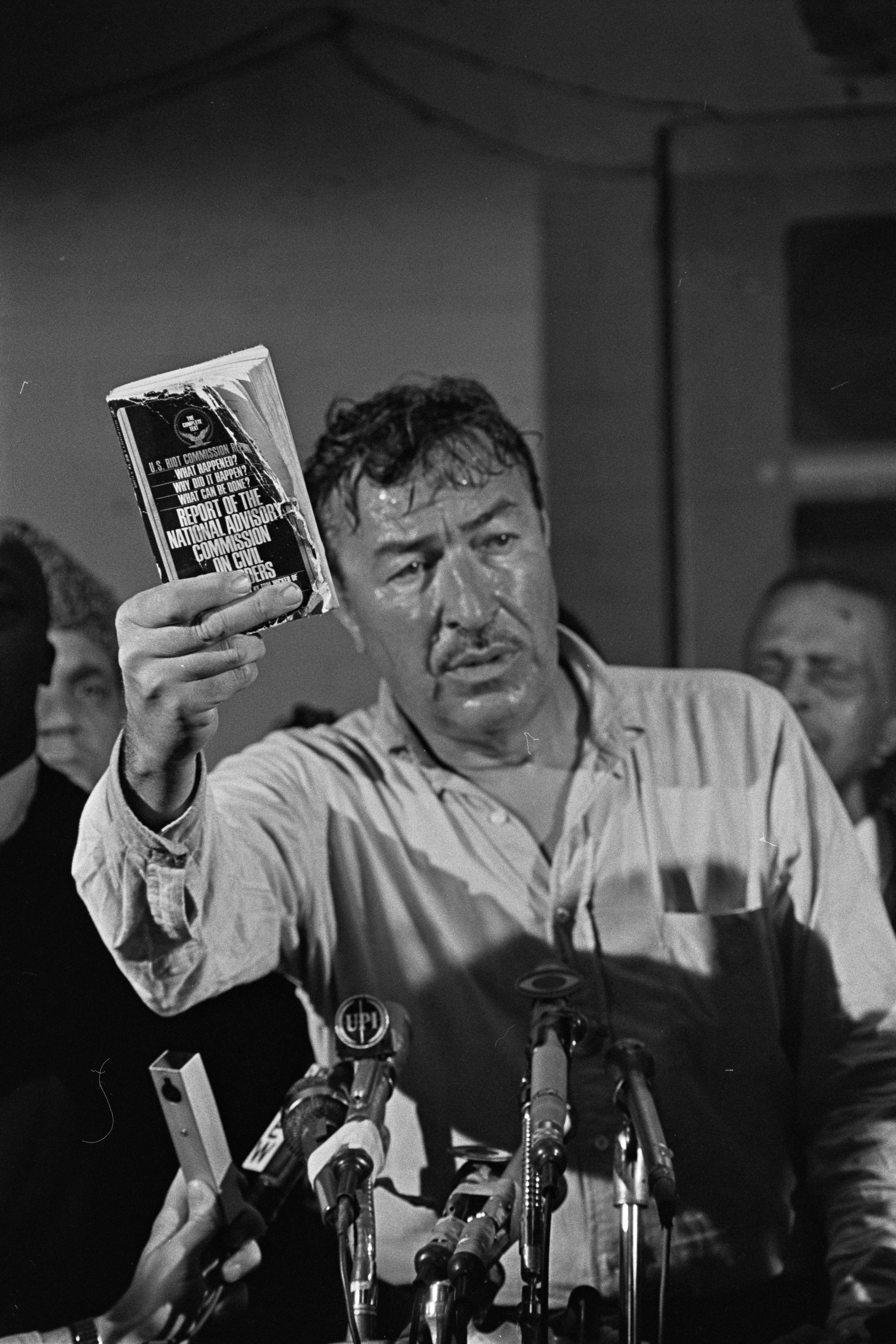
Powell holds a copy of the Report of the National Advisory Commission on Civil Disorders, March 23, 1968

Powell was instrumental in passing bills that desegregated public schools. He challenged the Southern practice of charging Blacks a poll tax to vote. Poll taxes for federal elections were prohibited by the 24th Amendment, passed in 1964. Voter registration and electoral practices were not changed substantially in most of the South until after passage of the Voting Rights Act of 1965, which provided federal oversight of voter registration and elections, and enforcement of the constitutional right to vote. In some areas where discrimination was severe, such as Mississippi, it took years for African Americans to register and vote in numbers related to their proportion in the population, but they have since maintained a high rate of registration and voting.

=== Political controversy ===
By the mid-1960s, Powell was increasingly being criticized for mismanaging his committee's budget, taking trips abroad at public expense, and missing meetings of his committee. When under scrutiny by the press and other members of Congress for personal conduct—he had taken two young women at government expense with him on overseas travel—he responded:

I wish to state very emphatically ... that I will always do just what every other Congressman and committee chairman has done and is doing and will do."

Opponents led criticism in his District, where his refusal to pay a 1963 slander judgment for $150,000 made him subject to arrest; he also spent increasing amounts of time in Florida.

==== Select House Committee to investigate Representative Adam Clayton Powell ====
In January 1967, the House Democratic Caucus stripped Powell of his committee chairmanship. A series of hearings on Powell's misconduct had been held by the 89th Congress in December 1966; they produced evidence that the House Democratic Caucus cited in taking this action. A Select House Committee was established upon the House's reconvening for the 90th Congress to further investigate Powell's misconduct to determine if he should be allowed to take his seat. This committee was appointed by the Speaker of the House. Its chairman was Emanuel Celler of New York and its members were James C. Corman, Claude Pepper, John Conyers, Andrew Jacobs Jr., Arch A. Moore Jr., Charles M. Teague, Clark MacGregor, and Vernon W. Thomson. This committee's inquiry centered on the following issues: "1. Mr. Powell's age, citizenship, and inhabitancy [sic]; 2. The status of legal proceedings to which Mr. Powell was a party in the State of New York and the Commonwealth of Puerto Rico with particular reference to the instances in which he has been held in contempt of court; and 3. Matters of Mr. Powell's alleged official misconduct since January 3, 1961."

Hearings of the Select House Committee to investigate Rep. Adam Clayton Powell were held over three days in February 1967. Powell was in attendance only on the first day of these hearings, February 8. Neither he nor his legal counsel requested that the select committee summon any witnesses. According to the official Congressional report on these committee hearings, Powell and his counsel's official position was that "the Committee had no authority to consider the misconduct charges."

The select committee found that Powell met residency requirements for Congressional representatives under the Constitution, but that Powell had asserted an unconstitutional immunity from earlier rulings against him in criminal cases tried in the New York State Supreme Court. The committee also found that Powell had committed numerous acts of financial misconduct. These included the appropriation of Congressional funds for his personal use, the use of funds meant for the House Education and Labor Committee to pay the salary of a housekeeper at his property on Bimini in The Bahamas, purchasing airline tickets for himself, family, and friends from the funds of the House Education and Labor Committee, as well as making false reports on expenditures of foreign currency while heading of the House Education and Labor Committee.

The members of the Select Committee had different opinions on the fate of Powell's seat. Pepper was strongly in favor of recommending that Powell not be seated at all, while Conyers, the only African American Representative on the Select Committee, felt that any punishment beyond severe censure was inappropriate. In fact, in the committee's official report, Conyers asserted that Powell's conduct during the two investigations of his conduct was not contrary to the dignity of the House of Representatives, as had been suggested by the investigation. Conyers also suggested that cases of misconduct brought before the House of Representatives never exceed censure. In the end, the Select House Committee to investigate Rep. Adam Clayton Powell recommended that Powell be seated but stripped of his seniority and forced to pay a fine of $40,000, citing article I, section 5, clause 2 of the Constitution, which gives each house of Congress the ability to punish members for improper conduct.

The full House refused to seat him until the completion of the investigation. Powell urged his supporters to "keep the faith, baby," while the investigation was underway. On March 1, the House voted 307 to 116 to exclude him, despite the recommendation of the Select Committee. Powell said, "On this day, the day of March, in my opinion, is the end of the United States of America as the land of the free and the home of the brave."

Powell won the Special Election to fill the vacancy caused by his exclusion, receiving 86% of the vote. But he did not take his seat, as he was filing a separate suit. He sued in Powell v. McCormack to retain his seat. In November 1968, Powell was re-elected. On January 3, 1969, he was seated as a member of the 91st Congress, but he was fined $25,000 and denied seniority. In June 1969, in Powell v. McCormack, the Supreme Court of the United States ruled that the House had acted unconstitutionally when it excluded Powell, as he had been duly elected by his constituents.

Powell's increasing absenteeism was observed by constituents, which contributed, in June 1970, to his defeat in the Democratic primary for reelection to his seat by Charles B. Rangel. Powell failed to garner enough signatures for inclusion on the November ballot as an Independent, and Rangel won that (and following) general elections. In the fall of 1970, Powell moved to his retreat on Bimini in The Bahamas, also resigning as minister at the Abyssinian Baptist Church.

== Personal life ==
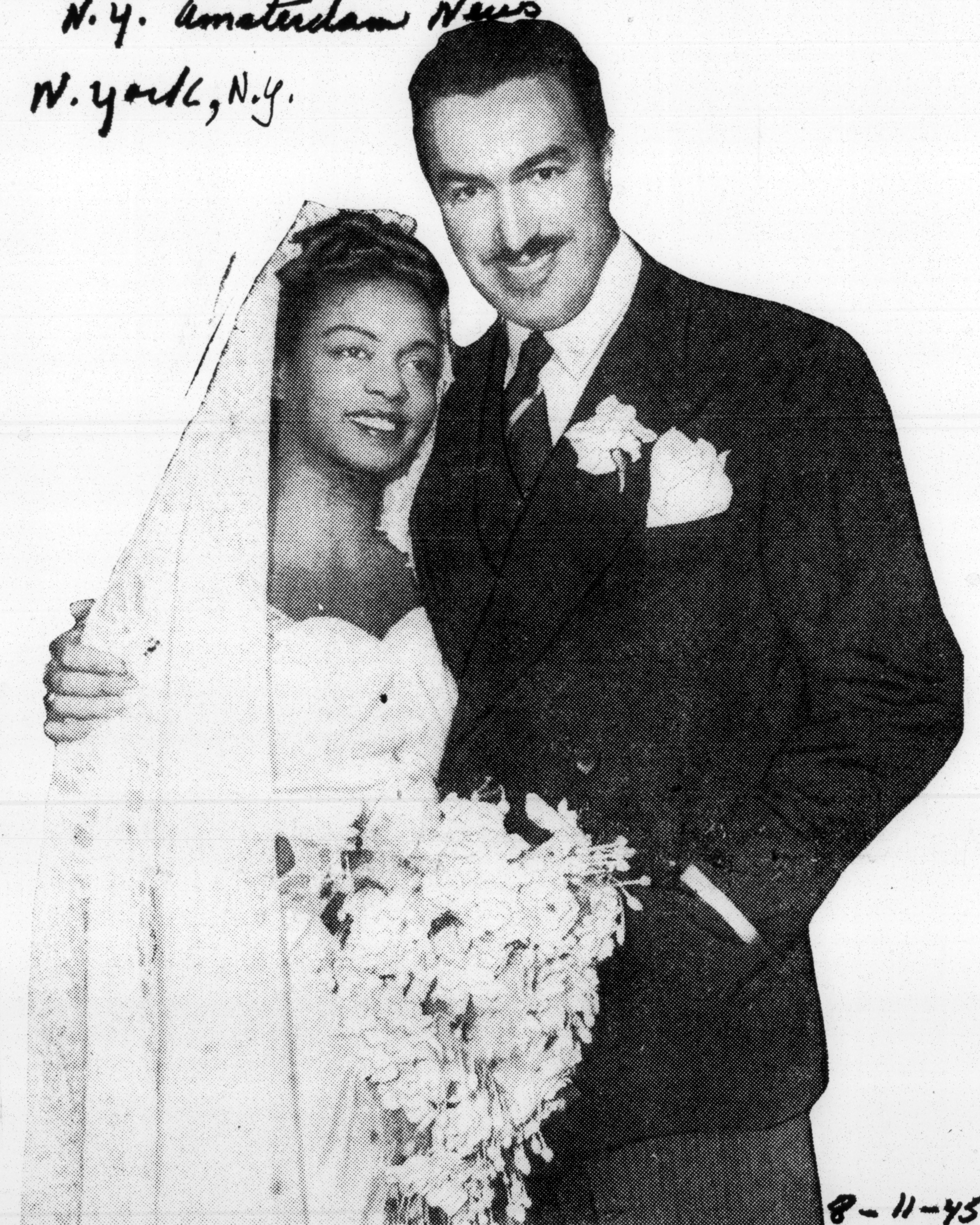
Powell and his second wife Hazel Scott on their wedding day, August 1, 1945

In 1933, Powell married Isabel Washington (1908–2007), an African-American singer and nightclub entertainer. She was the sister of actress Fredi Washington. Powell adopted Washington's son, Preston, from her first marriage.

After their divorce in 1945, Powell married jazz pianist and singer Hazel Scott. They had a son, Adam Clayton Powell III. In the early 21st century, Adam Clayton Powell III became Vice Provost for Globalization at the University of Southern California.

Powell divorced Scott and married Yvette Flores Diago from Puerto Rico in 1960. They had a son, whom they named Adam Clayton Powell Diago (using the mother's surname as a second surname, according to Hispanic tradition). In 1980, he changed his name to Adam Clayton Powell IV, dropping "Diago" when he moved from Puerto Rico to the mainland United States to attend Howard University. (Note: Adam Clayton Powell IV's half-nephew, eight years his junior, is also named Adam Clayton Powell IV and is a materials scientist.) Adam Clayton Powell IV, also known as A. C. Powell IV, was elected to the New York City Council in 1991 in a special election; he served for two terms. He also was elected as a New York state Assemblyman (D-East Harlem) for three terms and had a son named Adam Clayton Powell V. In 1994 and again in 2010, Adam Clayton Powell IV unsuccessfully challenged incumbent Rep. Charles B. Rangel for the Democratic nomination in his father's former congressional district.

=== Family scandal ===
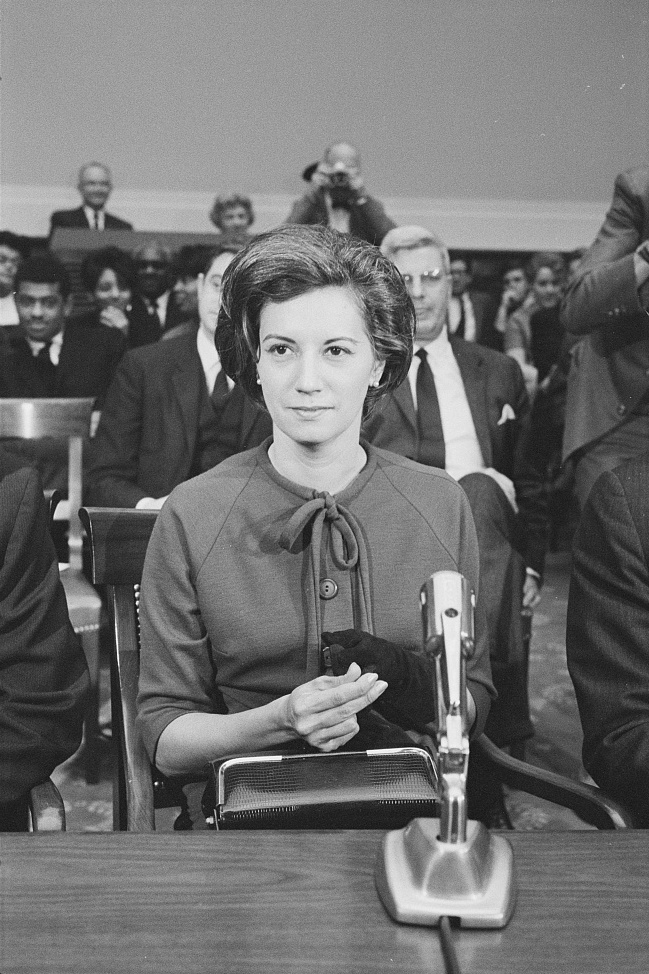
Yvette Diago Powell at a House committee hearing investigating charges against her husband, 1967

In 1967, a U.S. Congressional committee subpoenaed Yvette Diago while investigating potential "theft of state funds". This was related to Diago's having been on Powell Jr.'s payroll but not doing any work. Yvette Diago admitted she had been on her former husband's Congressional payroll from 1961 until 1967, though she had moved back to Puerto Rico in 1961. As reported by Time magazine, Yvette Diago had continued living in Puerto Rico and "performed no work at all," yet was kept on the payroll. Her salary was increased to $20,578 and she was paid until January 1967, when she was exposed and fired.

== Death ==
In April 1972, Powell became gravely ill and was flown to a Miami hospital from his home in Bimini. He died there April 4, 1972, at age 63, from acute prostatitis, according to contemporary newspaper accounts. His funeral took place at the Abyssinian Baptist Church in Harlem. Powell's son Adam III poured his father's ashes from a plane over the waters of Bimini.

== Legacy ==
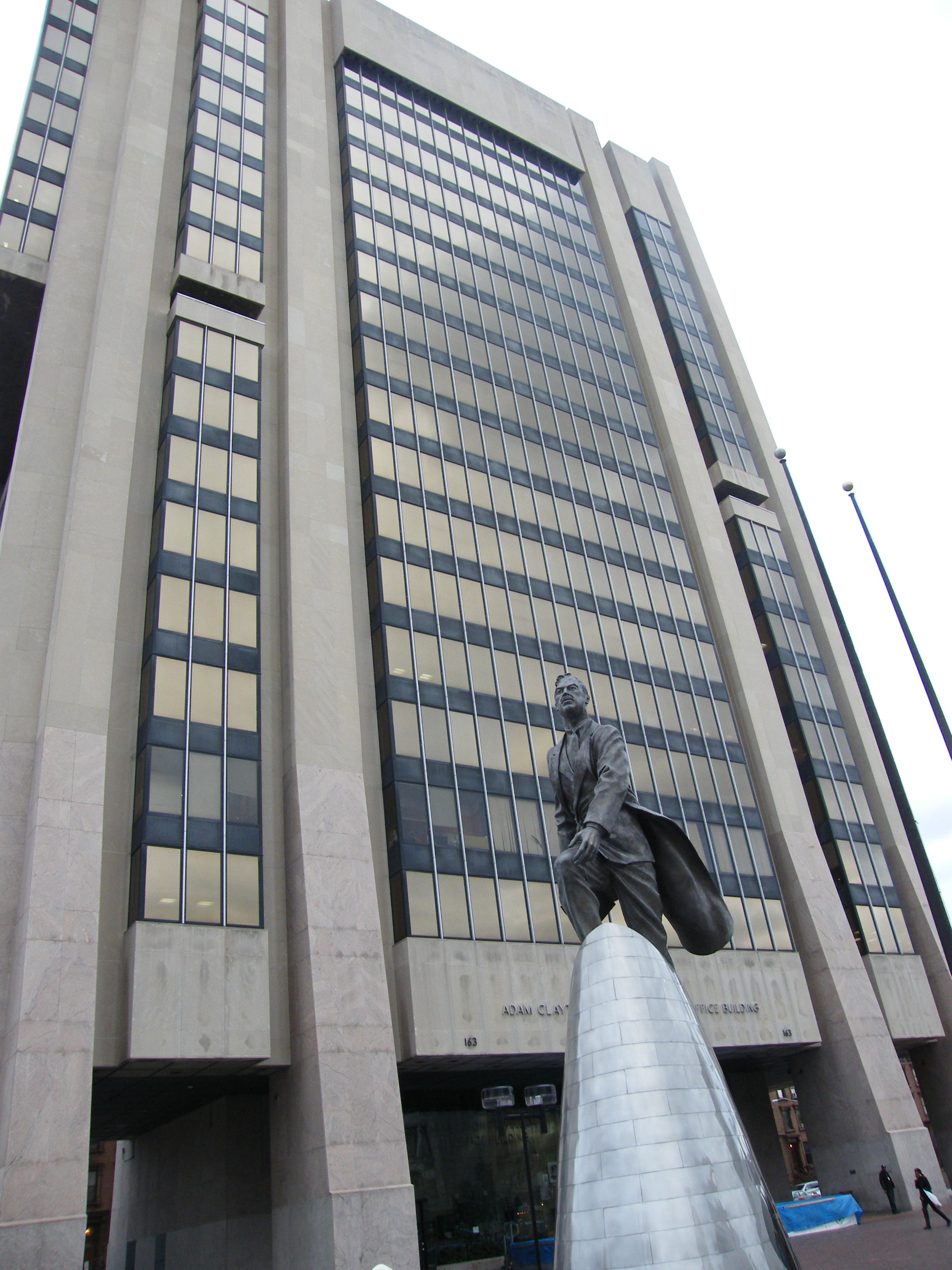
Adam Clayton Powell Jr. State Office Building at Adam Clayton Powell Jr. Boulevard and 125th Street in Harlem.

Seventh Avenue north of Central Park through Harlem was renamed Adam Clayton Powell Jr. Boulevard. One of the landmarks along this street is the Adam Clayton Powell Jr. State Office Building, named for Powell in 1983.

In addition, two New York City schools were named after him: PS 153 at 1750 Amsterdam Ave., and middle school IS 172 Adam Clayton Powell Jr. School of Social Justice, at 509 W. 129th St. (closed in 2009). In 2011, the Adam Clayton Powell Jr. Paideia Academy opened in Chicago's South Shore neighborhood.

Investigations into Powell's misconduct have been cited as an impetus for a permanent ethics committee in the House of Representatives as well as a permanent code of conduct for House members and their staff.

== Representation in other media ==
Powell was the subject of the 2002 cable television film Keep the Faith, Baby, starring Harry Lennix as Powell and Vanessa Williams as his second wife, jazz pianist Hazel Scott. The film debuted on February 17, 2002, on premium cable network Showtime. It garnered three NAACP Image Award nominations for Outstanding Television Movie, Outstanding Actor in a Television Movie (Lennix), and Outstanding Actress in a TV Movie (Williams). It won two National Association of Minorities in Cable (NAMIC) Vision Awards for Best Drama and Best Actor in a Television Film (Lennix), the International Press Association's Best Actress in a Television Film Award (Williams), and Reel.com's Best Actor in a Television Film (Lennix). The film's producers were Geoffrey L. Garfield, Powell IV's long-time campaign manager; Monty Ross, a confidant of Spike Lee; son Adam Clayton Powell III; and Hollywood veteran Harry J. Ufland. The film was written by Art Washington and directed by Doug McHenry.

Powell is portrayed by Giancarlo Esposito in the 2019 Epix cable series Godfather of Harlem.

Powell is featured by Paul Deo in his 2017 Harlem mural Planet Harlem.

Jeffrey Wright portrayed Powell in the 2023 Netflix film Rustin. As the story unfolds, the Powell character slowly comes around to a more positive view of the controversial Bayard Rustin character, who is portrayed as a Powell foe as the March on Washington is created.

Powell is referenced in the Vic Chesnutt song "Woodrow Wilson".

== Works ==
- (1945) Marching Blacks, An Interpretive History of the Rise of the Black Common Man
- (1962) The New Image in Education: A Prospectus for the Future by the Chairman of the Committee on Education and Labor
- (1967) Keep the Faith, Baby!
- (1971) Adam by Adam: The Autobiography of Adam Clayton Powell Jr.

== See also ==
- Adam Clayton Powell, a 1989 documentary film
- J. Raymond Jones
- List of African-American United States representatives
- List of federal political scandals in the United States
- List of United States representatives expelled, censured, or reprimanded
- Timeline of the civil rights movement
- Unseated members of the United States Congress
- List of people from Harlem

== Notes ==
U.S. House of Representatives
Preceded by Walter A. Lynch	Member of the U.S. House of Representatives from New York's 22nd congressional district 1945–1953	Succeeded by Sidney A. Fine
Preceded by James J. Murphy	Member of the U.S. House of Representatives from New York's 16th congressional district 1953–1963	Succeeded by John M. Murphy
Preceded by Graham Arthur Barden	Chair of the House Education Committee; 1961–1967	Succeeded by Carl D. Perkins
Preceded by Alfred E. Santangelo	Member of the U.S. House of Representatives from New York's 18th congressional district 1963–1971	Succeeded by Charles Rangel
