= Barbershop Quartet (health outreach program) =

The Barber Shop Quartet in New York City's Harlem neighborhood was founded in 2007 as an outreach program of the Men's Ministry at Abyssinian Baptist Church. The Barber Shop Quartet provides free men's health screenings for hypertension, diabetes, prostate cancer and colon cancer.

Abyssinian Baptist Church, Harlem's largest church with more than 4,000 congregants, initially partnered with Harlem Hospital Center and St. Luke's Roosevelt Hospital and received additional funding from the New York City Department of Health and Mental Hygiene to implement this program. Other initiating partners include the Ralph Lauren Center for Cancer Care and Prevention and Mount Sinai Hospital.

The Barber Shop Quartet works with local hospitals to provide doctors, nurses, and other volunteers to free health education and screenings for African American men for diabetes, hypertension, and prostate and colon cancers. Mobile medical units parked at participating barbershops throughout Harlem were the catalyst for the program's name. The Barber Shop Quartet also grants free follow-up care to those whose screenings have detected a health issue.

Streamlined in 2008, current partners of The Barber Shop Quartet include St. Luke's Roosevelt Hospital, New York University School of Medicine/Center for Healthful Behavior Change, the Albert Einstein College of Medicine Department of Epidemiology and Population Health, Division of Community Collaboration and Implementation Science, and the Albert Einstein Cancer Center, Cancer Prevention & Control Research Program.

== History ==
In 2007, Dr. Bert Petersen, Jr., a cancer surgeon and member of Harlem's Abyssinian Baptist Church, recognized that African-American men living in urban areas undergo disproportionate suffering from chronic diseases. When paired with the reduced likelihood of receiving proper care and treatment for those conditions, mortality was high. Dr. Petersen approached church leaders to assist him in creating a program to address these health disparities. Having previously conducted breast cancer education efforts in beauty parlors, Dr. Petersen launched a similar program for men, recognizing that on site screening in the friendly neighborhood setting of the barber shop would help to eliminate key barriers to accessing services.
