= African American Day Parade =

Harlem annual parade

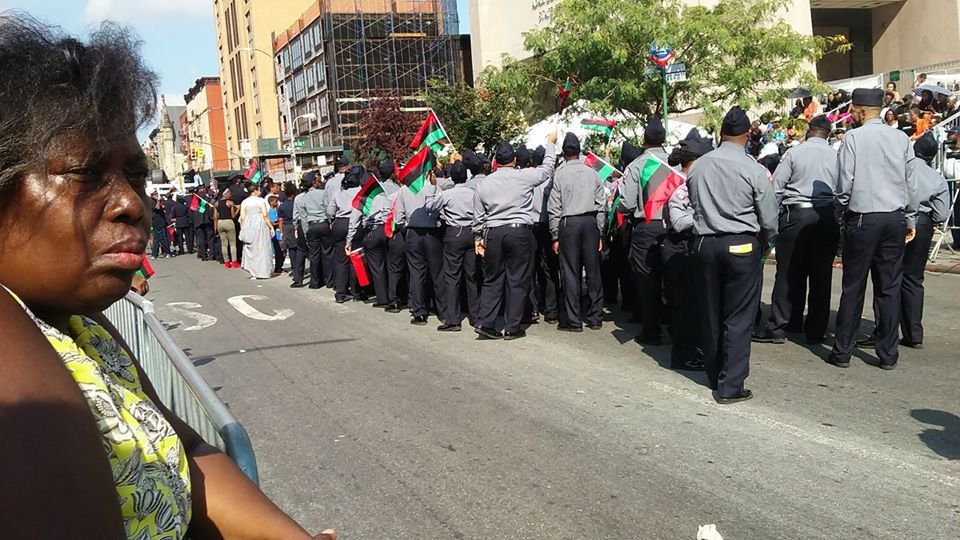
African American Day Parade, 2017

The African American Day Parade in Harlem is held every September, typically with participants from at least 12 states. It is one of the largest African American parades. It begins in Harlem on West 110th Street and Lenox Avenue and goes north along Adam Clayton Powell Boulevard (7th Ave.), ending at West 136th Street.

Participants come from throughout New York City and the U.S. and include 100 Black Men of America, National Coalition of 100 Black Women, Brotherhood of Grand Lodges, Prince Hall Grand Lodge, National Action Network, Ancient Egyptian Order, National Society of Black Engineers, National Association of Black Accountants, NAACP, New York Urban League, Spirit of Hope-Cancer Survivors, New York Black Nurses, 369th Veterans' Association, Grand Council of Guardians, Committee For A Slavery Memorial, Millions For Reparations, Vulcan Society, African American Benevolent Society, Association of Black Social Workers, Masjid Malcolm Shabazz, Muhammad Mosque No. 7, Yorubas of North America, organizations of the National Pan-Hellenic Council, colleges, labor unions, and religious groups, and social fraternal and sororal groups.

== History ==
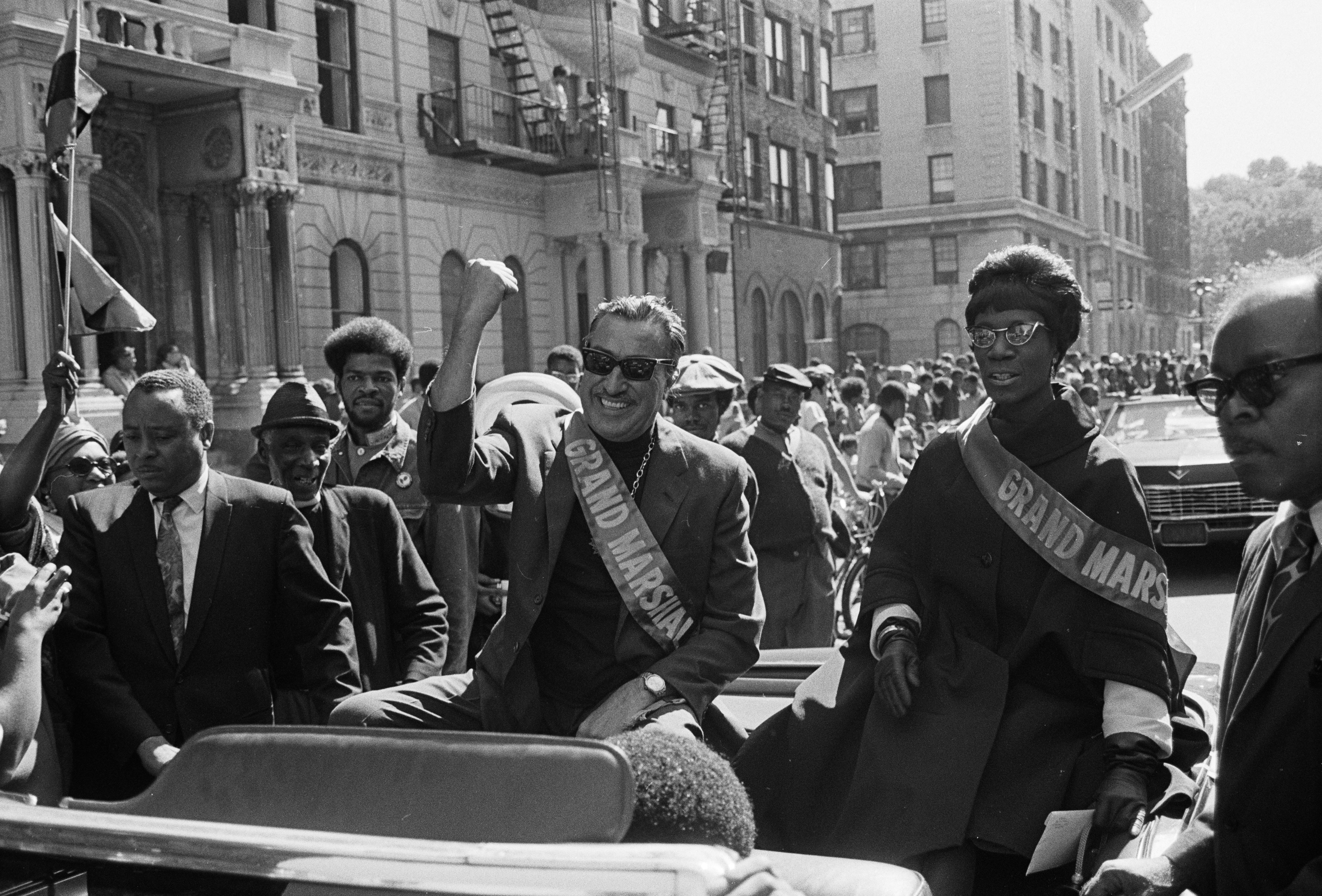
Adam Clayton Powell Jr. and Shirley Chisholm serve as Grand Marshals of Harlem's first African American Day Parade, September 21, 1969

The African American Day Parade was founded during the Civil Rights Movement in 1968. The main mission of the parade is to inspire a world where African Americans proclaim independence within our communities in the areas of Business, education, health, arts/culture & politics/government. The parade typically has a large viewing audience, and a large contingent of dignitaries, celebrities, bands, community leaders and elected officials attend. Past Grand Marshals have included Denzel Washington, Congressman Adam Clayton Powell Jr., Mayor David Dinkins, Congresswoman Shirley Chisholm, Johnnie Cochran, Spike Lee, Queen Mother Moore, Ossie Davis, Ruby Dee, Paul Winfield, Melba Moore and many others.

A virtual parade was held in 2020.

African American flag typically referred to as the RBG flag. Red representing the blood of African Americans, black representing the skin of African people, and green symbolizing the earth.

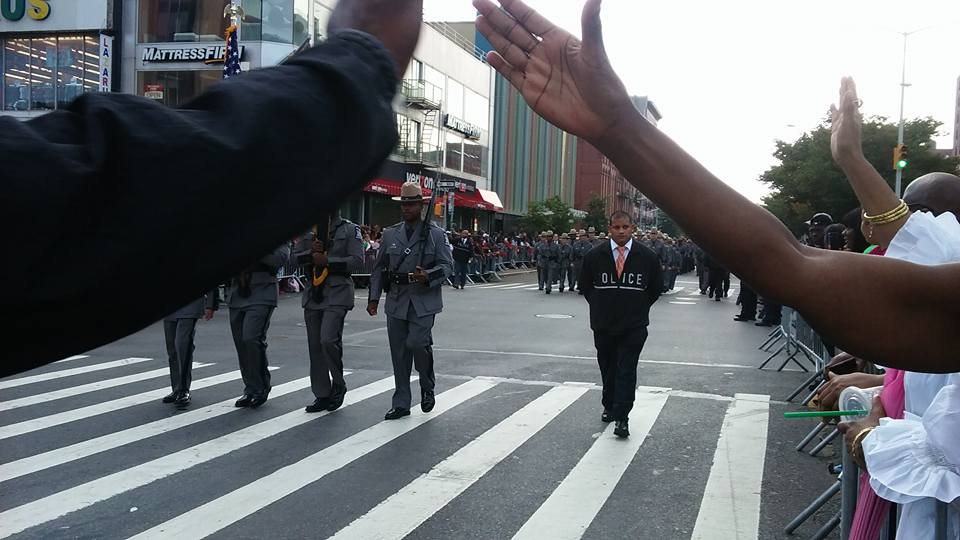
Police band within the African American Day Parade, 2017
