= Who's Who in Colored America =

Biographical book series

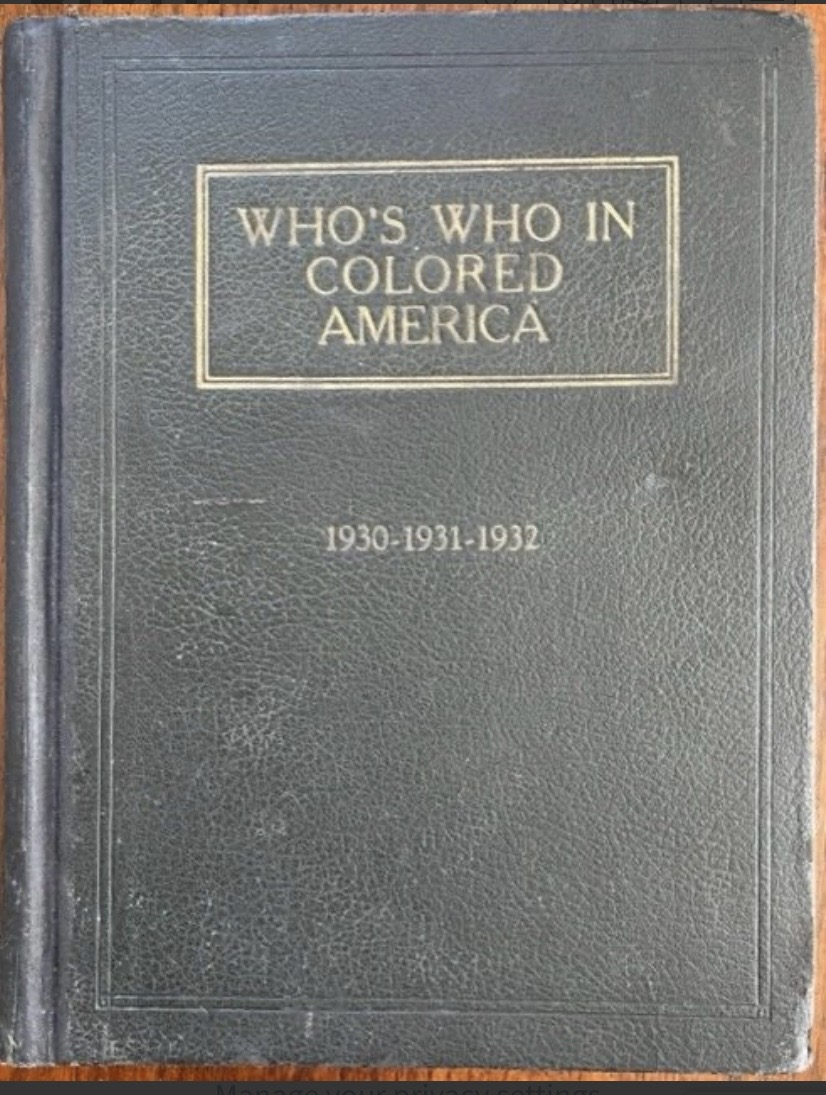
- Front cover of the 1930–1932 edition
- Editor: Joseph J. Boris (Eds. 1–2); Thomas Yenser (Eds. 3–6, foundational data for Ed. 7); G. James Fleming & Christian E. Burckel (Ed. 7)
- Language: English
- Genre: Biographical reference
- Publisher: Who's Who in Colored America Corp. (Eds. 1–2); Thomas Yenser, Publisher (Eds. 3–6); Christian E. Burckel & Associates (Ed. 7)
- Publication date: 1927–1950
- Publication place: United States
- Media type: Print (Hardcover)

Who's Who in Colored America was a biographical reference series published between 1927 and 1950 documenting notable African Americans. The series was founded by editor Joseph J. Boris and was later edited and published by Thomas Yenser.

== History ==
The series was established in 1927 under editor Joseph J. Boris, who oversaw the production of the first two volumes through 1929. The reference work covered African American professionals across fields such as education, business, law, medicine, literature, and the arts.

Prior to publication, The New York Times reported that the project was intended to have nationwide scope and was supported by an editorial board that included W. E. B. Du Bois, Alain Locke, Mary McLeod Bethune, Jessie Fauset, Charles S. Johnson, Kelly Miller, and other prominent African Americans. The article also described associated efforts to establish a "Negro Hall of Fame" and to identify influential African Americans for inclusion in the publication.

2317 Newkirk Avenue in Brooklyn, where Who's Who in Colored America was published in the 1930s and 1940s.

Thomas Yenser later became editor and publisher of the series and oversaw several subsequent editions. While early volumes had been developed with the support of a prominent editorial board, Yenser assumed responsibility for the publication's ongoing editorial and publishing operations. He ran the publishing operations out of his home at 2317 Newkirk Avenue in Brooklyn. Before managing the series, Yenser worked as a newspaper compositor in New York City. To compile biographical data, Yenser and his son traveled 30,000 miles across the United States. The directory documented the civic, professional, and religious achievements of notable African Americans. By the 1941–1944 edition, the publication had grown to 606 pages, with 117 leaves of illustrated plates. Published during the Jim Crow era, Who's Who in Colored America documented African American professionals, educators, artists, clergy, and public figures. Yenser maintained editorial and publishing control of the series through the sixth edition in 1944, serving as its editor and publisher.

Following Yenser's death in 1949, a final seventh edition of the series was published in 1950 by editors G. James Fleming and Christian E. Burckel. The edition drew upon research materials compiled during Yenser's tenure as editor and publisher. Shortly after its release, the publishers faced immediate legal pressure from the A.N. Marquis Company, the owners of Who's Who in America. Marquis threatened legal action, demanding that Christian E. Burckel & Associates cease using the phrase "Who's Who" in the title of their directory. No subsequent volumes or additional editions of the biographical reference series were ever published.

== Reception ==
A 1927 review in The New York Times described the volume as a new "Who's Who" modeled on established biographical reference works and noted that it contained more than 2,000 biographical sketches selected on the basis of achievement. The review highlighted representation from fields including business, law, medicine, education, religion, literature, and the arts.

== Content and layout ==
The sixth edition included profiles and photographic portrait plates of prominent figures, including W. E. B. Du Bois and Langston Hughes.

Physical copies of Who's Who in Colored America are held in the collections of the Library of Congress, the Schomburg Center for Research in Black Culture, and the Martin Luther King Jr. Memorial Library, which preserves copies of the 1928–1929 and 1941–1944 editions within its library holdings. These volumes are utilized in modern academic projects, such as University of Michigan student archives and studies on 20th-century rural reformers.

The individual volumes typically contained several hundred pages of alphabetically arranged entries identifying each subject’s profession and geographic location.
