= Adam Clayton Powell (film) =

1989 film directed by Richard Kilberg

- Film poster
- Directed by: Richard Kilberg
- Written by: Phyllis Garland; Richard Kilberg
- Produced by: Richard Kilberg; Yvonne Smith
- Narrated by: Julian Bond
- Cinematography: Bill Sheehy
- Distributed by: Direct Cinema
- Release date: 1989
- Running time: 54 minutes
- Country: United States
- Language: English

Adam Clayton Powell is a 1989 American documentary film directed by Richard Kilberg.

== Summary ==
The film is about the rise and fall of influential African-American politician Adam Clayton Powell Jr. It was later aired as part of the PBS series The American Experience.

== Accolades ==
It was nominated for an Academy Award for Best Documentary Feature.
