= Abyssinian Baptist Church =

Church in Manhattan, New York

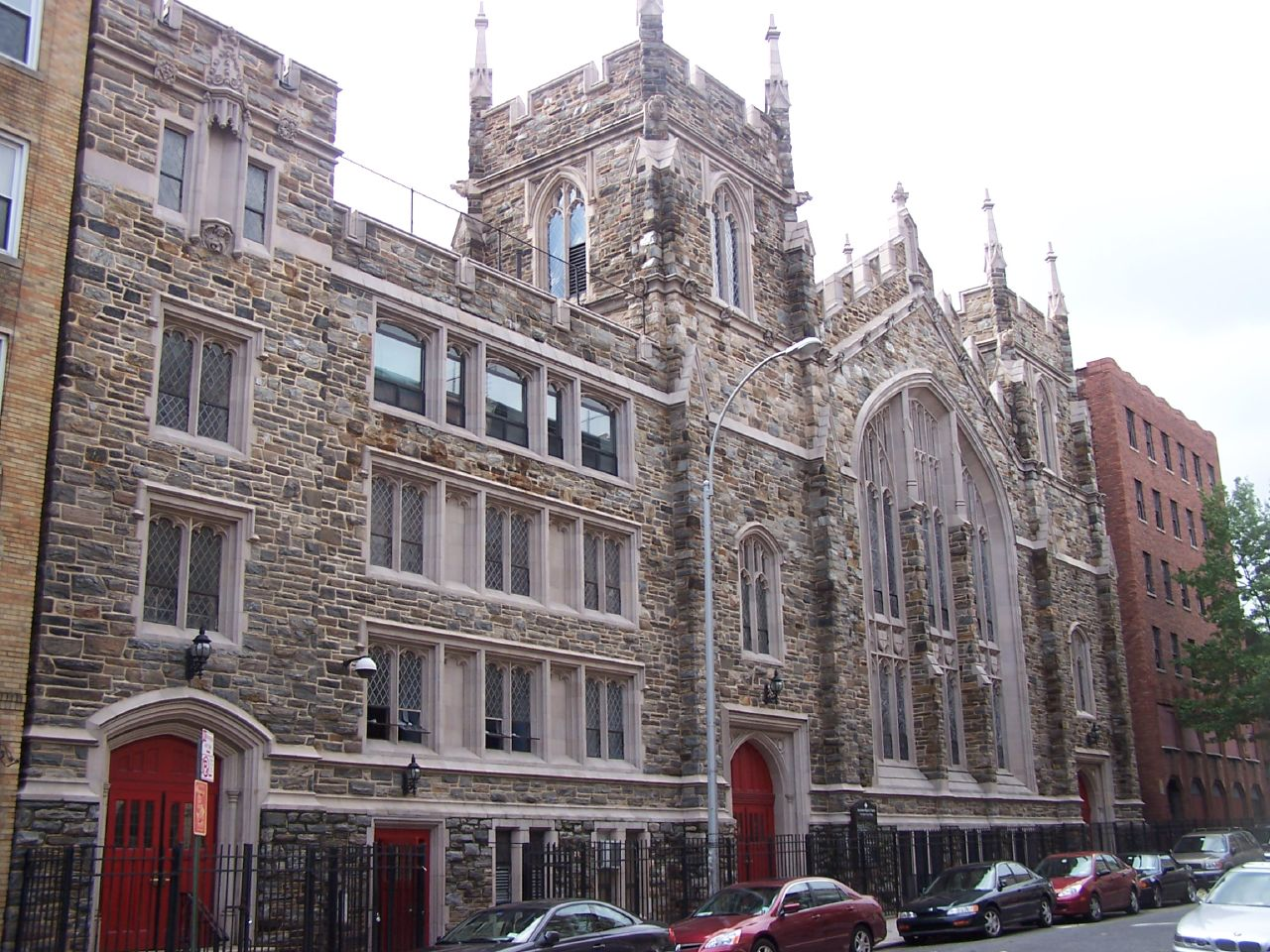
- Abyssinian Baptist Church
- 40°49′0″N 73°56′30″W
- Location: New York City
- Country: USA
- Denomination: Baptist
- Website: abyssinian.org

History
- Founded: 1808
- Founder: Thomas Paul

The Abyssinian Baptist Church is a Baptist megachurch located at 132 West 138th Street between Adam Clayton Powell Jr. Boulevard and Lenox Avenue in the Harlem neighborhood of Manhattan, New York City. It is affiliated with the National Baptist Convention, USA and American Baptist Churches USA.

The Abyssinian Baptist Church congregation traces its history to 1809, when seamen from the Ethiopian Empire (then known as Abyssinia) helped lead a walk-out protest against racially segregated church seating, and its congregation began to meet independently. Thomas Paul was an early minister of the church. During the 20th and 21st century, prominent ministers of the church included Adam Clayton Powell Sr., Adam Clayton Powell Jr., Samuel DeWitt Proctor, and Calvin O. Butts. The church has served as an influential place for African-American spirituality, politics and community.

The church worshiped in several places before building the present church structure. Its present building was built in 1922–23 and was designed by Charles W. Bolton & Son in Gothic Revival and Tudor Revival styles – it has also been described as "Collegiate Gothic". It features stained glass windows and marble furnishings. The church and its associated community house were designated a New York City Landmark on July 13, 1993.

== History ==
The congregation began after an incident in 1808, when visiting Ethiopian seamen and free African-American parishioners left the First Baptist Church in protest over being restricted to racially segregated seating. They named their new congregation the Abyssinian Baptist Church after the historic name of Ethiopia.

The congregation worshiped at a number of places: first on the corner of William and Frankfort Streets, then at 44 Anthony (Worth) Street until the mortgage upon the church was foreclosed upon in 1854, at which time the congregation worshipped temporarily at 356 Broadway. Then in 1856 they established themselves at 166 Waverly Place in Greenwich Village, an area then sometimes called "little Africa." It was during their time here that the church split into two "warring" factions, one for the Rev. William M. Spelman, who had been with them since 1855, and one desiring his removal. In 1885, Rev. Spelman was ousted from the pulpit, at which time he and his followers went to another church on 37th Street. In 1902 the congregation moved uptown with the movement of the African American population, to 242 West 40th Street, and from there to a tent pitched next to the future site of Marcus Garvey's Liberty Hall in Harlem, where the size of the congregation increased dramatically thanks to the preaching of Adam Clayton Powell Sr., who had become the pastor in 1908. The church purchased property on the same street for a new sanctuary, paid for by tithes and offerings.

Dietrich Bonhoeffer, the future prominent German theologian, anti-Nazi activist and martyr, arrived in New York in 1930 - then a young student doing postgraduate study at the Union Theological Seminary. Frank Fisher, a black fellow-seminarian, introduced Bonhoeffer to the Abyssinian Church, where Bonhoeffer taught Sunday school and formed a lifelong love for African-American spirituals, a collection of which he took back to Germany. He heard Adam Clayton Powell Sr. preach the Gospel of Social Justice, and became sensitive to not only social injustices experienced by minorities but also the ineptitude of the church to bring about integration. It was there that Bonhoeffer began to see things "from below"—from the perspective of those who suffer oppression. He observed, "Here one can truly speak and hear about sin and grace and the love of God... the Black Christ is preached with rapturous passion and vision." Later Bonhoeffer referred to his impressions abroad as the point at which he "turned from phraseology to reality."—themes which were on Bonhoeffer's return to Germany manifested in his outspoken opposition to the Nazi regime and especially to its persecution of the Jews, and for which Bonhoeffer eventually paid with his life.

By 1930, the church had 13,000 members, making it the largest African-American church in New York City, and the largest Baptist congregation in the world. Powell handed the reins of the church to his son Adam Clayton Powell Jr. in 1937. The younger Powell became the first black Congressman from New York City, and served 14 terms in the United States House of Representatives. Powell's "charisma, power, and notoriety", as well as his "spellbinding" preaching were the driving force behind the church's significant influence in the African American community at the time.

The funeral of David Baldwin, preacher and step-father of author James Baldwin, took place in the Abyssinian Baptist Church, during the wake of the 1943 Harlem riot. James Baldwin wrote of attending his father's funeral in his most famous essay, 1955's Notes of a Native Son.

In 1972, Samuel DeWitt Proctor became senior pastor and a prominent voice in religious and national matters. In 1989, Calvin O. Butts became senior pastor and followed in this tradition, serving until his death in 2022.

== Music ==
The church was an important site for religious music during the Harlem Renaissance, and remains a center of the Harlem gospel tradition. Fats Waller played the organ at Abyssinian when his father, Edward Martin Waller, was a minister at the church. Among many important events, the church conducted the 1948 wedding of Nat King Cole and his bride Maria, and the funeral of "The Father of Blues", W.C. Handy, in 1958.

== Abyssinian Development Corporation ==
In 1989, Butts founded the Abyssinian Development Corporation (ADC), creating a non-profit arm of the church to work on community development and social services. It has created $500 million in development, including the first new high school in Harlem in 50 years, the first large supermarket, a retail center, and housing.

The group purchased the neighboring historic, but dilapidated, Renaissance Ballroom and Casino in 1993 promising to restore it, but they held the property before selling it to BRP Development Corporation for $15 million. The original plan was to restore the Renaissance and build additional facilities above the original structure. ADC fought landmark status in 2007, arguing that it would make restoration impossible. They sold the property in 2014 and the original structure was demolished in 2015, in its place stands condominiums.

== See also ==
- Barbershop Quartet, (2007) health outreach program
