= Thomas Yenser =

American publisher and editor (1866–1949)

- The Yenser family in New York, circa 1913. Back row (left to right): Mary, Agnes, and publisher Thomas Yenser; front row (left to right): Theresa, Tom (Thomas Jr.), Edna, and John.
- Born: February 16, 1866; Lehighton, Pennsylvania, Carbon County, U.S.
- Died: September 10, 1949 (aged 83); Kings County, New York, U.S.
- Occupations: Publisher, editor, newspaper compositor
- Known for: Editor and publisher of Who's Who in Colored America (editions 3–6)
- Spouse: Agnes Connelly (m. 1896)
- Children: Mary Yenser; Edna Yenser; Thomas Yenser Jr.; Theresa Yenser; John Yenser
- Parent(s): Charles Yenser and Mary E. Yenser

Thomas Yenser (February 16, 1866 – September 10, 1949) was an American publisher and editor who compiled the biographical directory series Who's Who in Colored America from 1930 until his death in 1949. Born in Lehighton, Pennsylvania, he began his career in the printing trades as a youth before working as a newspaper compositor in New York City for publications including the New-York Tribune and Evening Telegram.

In 1904, Yenser relocated to Copiague, New York, spending a decade as a Long Island real estate developer, commercial builder, and local civic official. Following foreclosure on his Long Island holdings, he returned to New York City and entered the automotive industry, serving from 1918 to 1922 as president of the American Motor Truck and Tractor Company.

By 1928, Yenser had returned to publishing as secretary-treasurer of the Who’s Who in Colored America Corporation. He later succeeded Joseph J. Boris as editor and publisher of the directory with its third edition, traveling across the United States to compile biographical profiles of notable African Americans in civic, professional, and religious fields across four volumes. Yenser and his wife, Agnes Connelly, raised five children. He lived and worked in Brooklyn until his death. Volumes of Who’s Who in Colored America are held in the collections of the Library of Congress and the Schomburg Center for Research in Black Culture.

== Career ==
=== Early printing career (1886–1904) ===
Yenser entered the professional printing trades as a youth in his hometown of Lehighton, Pennsylvania, receiving instruction in typography within the offices of the local Carbon Advocate before relocating to New York City in September 1886. He worked in typography for various metropolitan newspapers across the New York area, including the New-York Tribune, City Record, and Evening Telegram. He continued in the commercial printing and newspaper trades until late 1904, when he shifted his focus to real estate development on Long Island.

=== Long Island real estate and civic career (1904–1914) ===
In 1904, Yenser relocated from Queens to Copiague in the Town of Babylon, Suffolk County, New York, where he was initially associated with the Long Island Rail Road and operated a poultry farm. By the end of the decade, he had shifted his focus to real estate development and land subdivision in the growing South Shore communities.

Yenser established a real estate office in Copiague, developed residential properties, and oversaw the construction of a two-story commercial storefront block on Great Neck Road. He filed subdivision maps for residential development and promoted home construction and local investment opportunities. Property originating from one of his subdivision maps continues to be identified in Suffolk County land records as part of the Thomas Yenser subdivision.

In addition to his business activities, Yenser participated in local civic affairs and politics. He served as a trustee of Babylon School District No. 5, was active in the Independence League, chaired local party meetings, and was nominated in 1909 as a fusion candidate for town assessor. In his official capacity as a school trustee, he was also named as a defendant in a 1910 New York Supreme Court taxpayer lawsuit regarding school facility funding. During this period, he also advocated for local infrastructure improvements, including transportation access, public lighting, road improvements, and waterfront development projects in the Copiague area. In September 1913, Yenser was credited in local newspaper accounts with rescuing a New York City schoolteacher from drowning in a creek near Copiague.

Financial difficulties eventually affected portions of Yenser's Long Island real estate holdings, resulting in foreclosure proceedings. He returned to Brooklyn by 1915, concluding a decade of business and civic involvement in Suffolk County.

=== Automotive executive career (1918–1922) ===
By 1918, Yenser had entered the automotive industry as a corporate executive. He served as president of the American Motor Truck and Tractor Company, an enterprise incorporated with an authorized capital stock of $1,000,000. Yenser operated the company alongside Vice President Emil M. Snyder and Secretary John V. Gormley. While the corporate headquarters were located at 110 West 40th Street in New York City, the manufacturing plant was a 40,000-square-foot facility on Freestone Avenue in Portland, Connecticut.

In late 1919 and early 1920, Yenser managed a regional stock promotion and marketing campaign across New England. The company advertised 2-ton and 4-ton commercial trucks built under the brand name American. The vehicles were exhibited at the Hartford Automobile Show and the New Haven Truck Show to establish a regional dealer network.

The company placed financial advertisements in newspapers including the New Britain Herald and Lowell Sun to sell shares. The company sold 7% cumulative preferred stock for $12 per share, offering one share of common stock with each purchase. Marketing materials projected a production goal of 300 trucks for the year 1920. In September 1922, Yenser was listed as one of three incorporators of the American Motor Truck Finance Corporation, a $1,000,000 company incorporated in New Jersey and based in Newark. The American Motor Truck and Tractor Company remained listed in Portland in a 1922 New England business directory.

=== Who's Who in Colored America (1928–1949) ===
2317 Newkirk Avenue in Brooklyn, where Yenser lived and published the directory in the 1930s and 1940s.

By December 1928, Yenser was secretary-treasurer of Who’s Who in Colored America Corporation in New York City and was involved in preparations for a new edition of the directory. Yenser succeeded founder Joseph J. Boris as editor and publisher of Who's Who in Colored America with its third edition (covering 1930–1932), managing operations from 2317 Newkirk Avenue in Brooklyn, New York. He began work on the series' fifth edition by 1938 to update existing profiles and compile biographical sketches.

To compile biographical data, Yenser and his son traveled 30,000 miles across the United States. The directory documented civic, professional, and religious achievements of notable African Americans. By the 1941–1944 edition, the publication had grown to 606 pages, with 117 leaves of illustrated plates. The directory was widely distributed to public libraries, state networks, and academic institutions, with copies ordered by Harvard, Yale, Duke University, Notre Dame, and the University of Minnesota. The State of Louisiana also purchased 75 copies of the directory for statewide distribution.

During his regional travel, Yenser actively campaigned for public cooperation to ensure the directory's biographical listings remained comprehensive. By the 1940s, syndicated columns cited the directories as a source of Black professional achievement.

== Personal life ==
Thomas Yenser was born in Lehighton, Pennsylvania, in 1866 to Charles and Mary E. Yenser. He married Agnes Connelly in 1896, and the couple raised five children: Mary, Edna, Thomas Jr., Theresa, and John.

Their daughter Edna later married John V. Gormley, who served alongside Yenser as corporate secretary during his tenure as an automotive executive. After living in Copiague, New York, for approximately a decade, Yenser had returned to Brooklyn by 1915. He later resided and operated his publishing business at 2317 Newkirk Avenue until his death in 1949.

== Death and legacy ==
Yenser died in New York on September 10, 1949, at the age of 83, while compiling the seventh edition of the directory.

The publication rights to the series were later acquired by publisher Christian E. Burckel, who continued the directory using Yenser's compiled archives. Volumes of Who’s Who in Colored America are held in the collections of the Library of Congress and the Schomburg Center for Research in Black Culture. The directories have also been used as sources in later biographical and archival research.

== Selected publications ==
- Who's Who in Colored America: A Biographical Dictionary of Notable Persons of African Descent in America. Brooklyn, New York: Thomas Yenser (Editor and publisher; managed editions 3–6, 1930–1944).
