= Elihu Akin House =

Historic Building in Dartmouth, Massachusetts

- Alternative names: The Little House with a Big Story to Tell

General information
- Type: Pre-Georgian Cape Cod
- Location: 762 Dartmouth Street, Dartmouth, Massachusetts, US
- Coordinates: 41°35′46″N 70°56′31″W
- Year built: 1762
- Renovated: 2004-
- Owner: Dartmouth Heritage Preservation Trust

Height
- Height: 8 ft (2.4 m)

Technical details
- Floor count: 1

Design and construction
- Architect: Job Mosher

Other information
- Number of rooms: 5

Website
- https://dhpt.org/

The Elihu Akin House is a house in Dartmouth, Massachusetts, United States. It was built in 1762 by carpenter Jon Mosher. The house was later owned by the Akins, who were a prominent local family; Elihu Akin moved into the house after his own former home had been burnt in Grey's raid during the American Revolutionary War. At the start of the 21st century, the house was extensively renovated. The Dartmouth Heritage Preservation Trust and the town of Dartmouth now own the house.

== History ==
David and Mary Akin immigrated from Scotland to Portsmouth, Rhode Island, in 1663. John Akin was the eldest of their three sons; he purchased land at Smiths Neck—from the uncle of his wife, Mary Briggs—and moved to Dartmouth in 1692. Twenty years later, John Akin married his second wife and paid £550 for farmland in South Dartmouth. John fathered eight sons, one of whom was Elihu. During the colonial period, the Akins were involved in shipbuilding, and they became one of the wealthiest families in Dartmouth. In 1723, John was acting as a tax collector, and he refused to collect the taxes which had been imposed by the General Court of Massachusetts. He was sentenced to fifteen months in prison at New Bristol. The case was argued before the Massachusetts Governor's Council and John was released; this event marks the end of the persecution of Quakers in Massachusetts. Elihu Akin, the house's namesake, trained as a shipwright in Newport in 1747. Elihu and James Akin owned several businesses, including taverns, in Dartmouth; by 1761 they were managing a shipyard at the foot of Prospect Street. Prior to the American Revolution, Elihu Akin became a selectman in Padanaram.

The Elihu Akin House was built on property that had once been part of Jacob Russell's farm. Job Mosher, a house carpenter, built the house as a wedding gift for his bride Amie Akin. In 1767, five years after Mosher had built the house, he and Amie moved (possibly to New York). They sold the eighteen-acre property to Captain Jonathan Delano Jr. Shortly thereafter, Delano died at sea; in December 1769, his widow sold the property to Amie's uncle Elihu Akin; at that point the property had been reduced to thirteen acres; the sale was recorded on June 12, 1770. The house was located on Potters Hill, a mile from the mansion where Elihu lived; he hired tenants to till the land and live in the house. The area became known as Akin's Landing.

During the American Revolution, members of the Akin family were probably privateers. Elihu Akin's son Jonathan sailed from Dartmouth aboard a ship that was probably owned by his father, and was captured by the Royal Navy. He subsequently escaped from British captivity and sailed south aboard a ship that was captured by the French Navy. Akin was once again imprisoned. He wrote a letter to Benjamin Franklin—who was known to be a friend of France—that asked for Franklin to work for Akin's release. Benjamin Akin, another member of the Akin family in Dartmouth, wrote a letter to Samuel Adams in July 1774, in which he asked for Adams to tell him what the town of Dartmouth might do, to meet the needs of their "common cause".

Due to the Akin family's activities, the Akins were targeted by British raiding parties that entered Padanaram in 1778 in Grey's raid. Elihu Akin had expelled three Loyalists from Massachusetts, and the three led the British to the Akins' properties. The raiding parties burnt the homes of Elihu, James, Meribah and John Akin, along with their shipyard. Fixing the damage from the raid eventually cost £105,960 in Massachusetts pounds ($8.89 million, adjusted for inflation, in 2023). Since the raiders had not destroyed the farmhouse on Potters Hill, Elihu Akin chose it to be his dwelling place. He lived there with his wife Ruth Perry and his younger children. After Perry had died, Elihu married Ruth Allen. Elihu never recovered financially from the raid, and he died a poor man in 1794, at the age of 74. In honor of Elihu, and to commemorate his contribution to local shipbuilding, the village of Padanaram was called Akin's Wharf for the 20 years following the war.

Elihu Akin had willed his property to his sons Joseph and Abraham. In 1839, it was divided, and the house and the eastern portion of the land went to Joseph Akin. After Joseph died, the property went to his daughter, Mrs. Waterman. Her grandson Richard Canfield—who grew up to become a notorious gambler, as well as an art collector—spent the summer of his thirteenth year at the Akin House with his grandmother. Canfields mother, Julia Akin Canfield, lived in the Elihu Akin house following her husband's death.

In 1921, local buildings in the Dartmouth and New Bedford areas—including the Apponegansett Meeting House and the Elihu Akin House—appeared in the film Down to the Sea in Ships. In the film, the Akin House was described as the "Old Homestead", and a scene shows the house's rear entry. The film provides the only known photographic evidence of there having been a barn and a shed at the house at that time (today, a thirty-foot one-story shed stands behind the house); the film also serves as a visual aid that highlights the house's early-twentieth-century landscaping, showing details such as a wall and a gate on the back-side property line.

In the 1930s, Elihu Akin's descendants leased the house to tenants; by 1980 it stood empty.

== Restoration ==
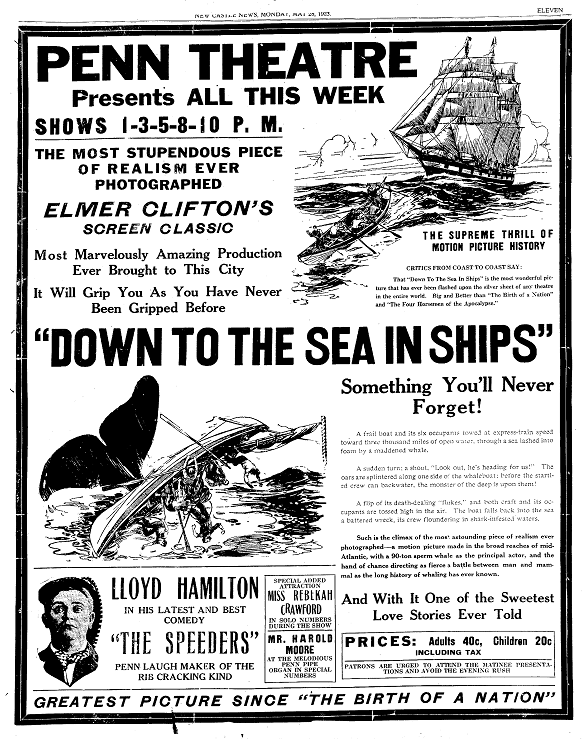
Poster for Down to the Sea in Ships

Originally, the Elihu Akin house was preserved by the Waterfront Historic Area LeaguE (WHALE) of New Bedford. WHALE hired preservation consultant Anne Baker, who dubbed the building "the little house with a big story to tell." In 2003, WHALE purchased the property from Elihu Akin's descendants for $185,000. The building was returned to the ownership of the town of Dartmouth, which leases it to the nonprofit Dartmouth Heritage Preservation Trust (DHPT), whose stewardship of the house began in 2008. The DHPT agreed to restore, preserve, and operate the Akin House, with the goal of making it a Study House, a working classroom, and a tourist information center. The DHPT joined with the town to execute a $300,000 three-part plan to restore the house's original appearance. The plan included the installation of locally-milled-oak corner-posts, native pine paneling, and new kitchen walls; the excavation of the house's original fireplace; and the installation of a chair lift on the house's back deck. In July 2018, the DHPT received a $13,000 grant from the National Trust for Historic Preservation to restore the Akin House's sitting room.

== Current use ==
The University of Massachusetts Dartmouth conducted the Elihu Akin House Archaeology Project between the summer of 2008 and the summer of 2009. Dr. Christina Hodge led the project, which discovered 10,793 artifacts and fragments. These were catalogued and made available for access at the Claire T. Carney Library Archives and Special Collections at UMass Dartmouth.

In July 2012, the Akin House began to host historical lectures, as well as archaeology-themed events for kids. At the Southworth Library, historian William B. Taylor lectured on the house.

The Dartmouth Heritage Preservation Trust hosts the annual Never Idle Hands event at the Elihu Akin House. Historical reenactors demonstrate aspects of life in the 1700s: cooking, chairmaking using froes, weaponry, clothing and fashion, and household labor. Reenactors portray figures from the 1700s such as Major General Charles Grey.

== Description ==
The house's bricks were made in England and shipped to America while serving as ship ballast. The house has a beehive oven concealed behind the fireplace, which was used to bake bread and beans.

The Akin House is a side-gabled, double-pile building. The house has one floor, a basement and an attic. It has two structural bays, with an off-center brick chimney. Due to the house being a product of several different centuries, its architecture includes Greek revival fireplaces and mantels, a Federal style door, as well as Georgian elements. The house still retains many of its original 18th-century features, including its wallpaper and some corner posts. The house's roof has sagged notably since the early 1800s.

The house is built on a mound named Potters Hill. It stands at the corner of Dartmouth and Rockland Streets.
