= Padanaram, Massachusetts =

Village in Dartmouth, Massachusetts

- Padanaram Village Historic District (South Dartmouth, MA)
- U.S. National Register of Historic Places
- U.S. Historic district
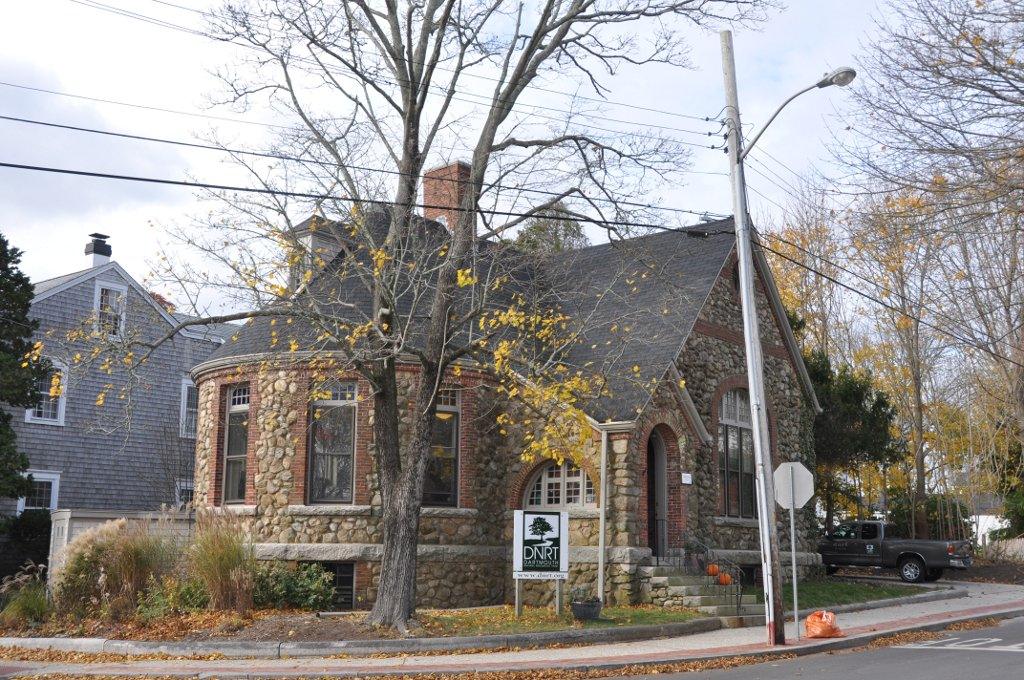
- Southworth Library

- Location within Massachusetts Location within the United States
- Location: Dartmouth, Massachusetts
- Coordinates: 41°35′8″N 70°56′30″W
- Architect: Multiple
- Architectural style: Colonial Revival, Late Victorian, Federal
- NRHP reference No.: 85002010
- Added to NRHP: September 5, 1985

Padanaram [ˈpeɪdnˌɛɹəm] is a coastal village in South Dartmouth, Massachusetts, United States. The village is located on Buzzards Bay, more specifically near the inlet of Apponagansett Bay.

== Etymology ==
The name "Padanaram" came from a prominent early resident named Laban Thatcher, who came from Harwich, Massachusetts around 1805. Thatcher identified with the Biblical figure Laban, who resided in Paddan Aram (meaning 'the field of Aram' in Aramaic), located along the Euphrates in the region of Mesopotamia. The village eventually adopted this new name, and dropped its earlier Wampanoag name, "Ponagansett."

== History ==
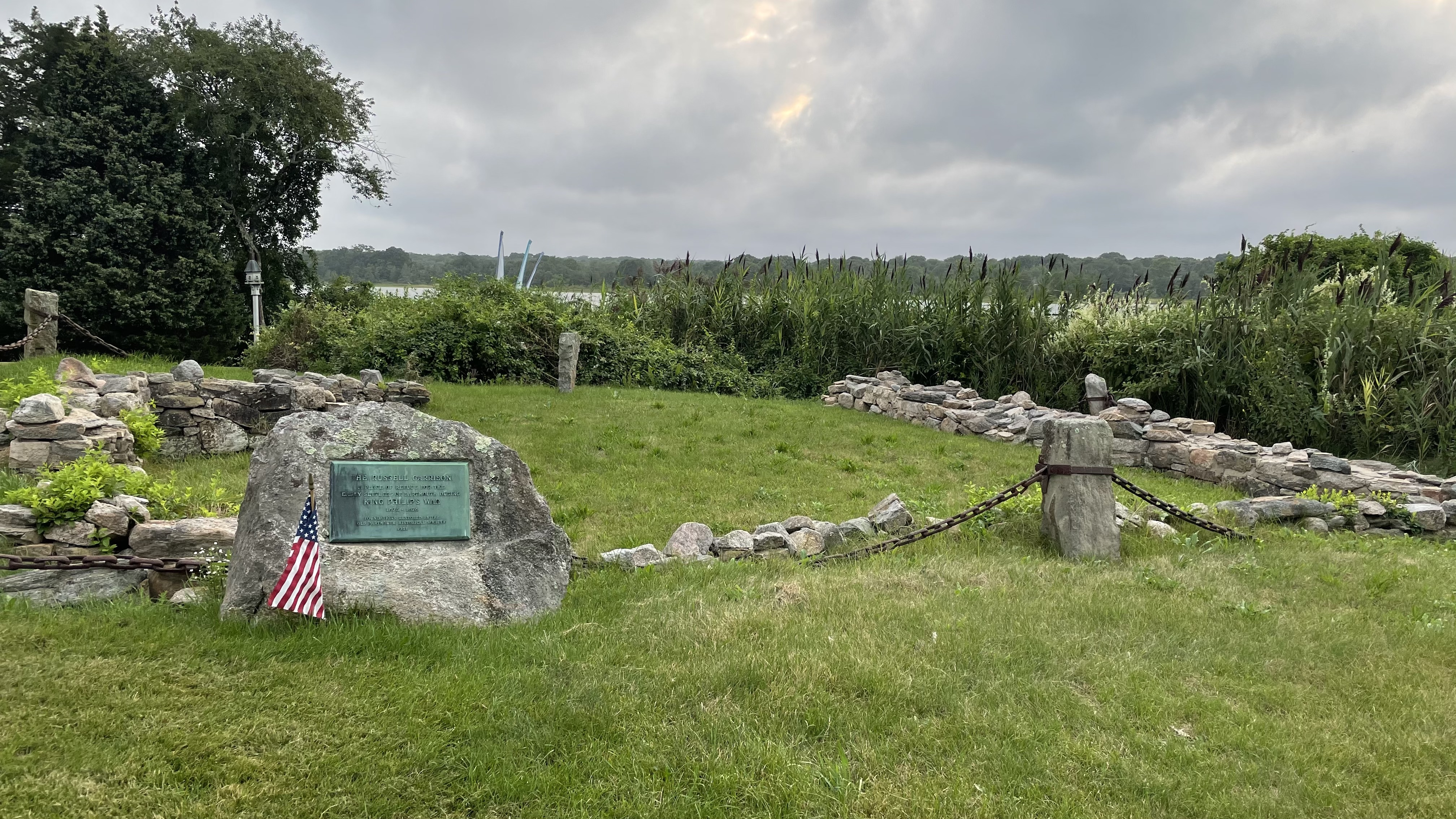
Russell Garrison in Padanaram. English colonists residing in the area garrisoned here June 1675 fearing an attack from the Pokanoket in King Philip's War.

The village of Padanaram was one of many settlements that began cropping up within the town of Old Dartmouth after its purchase from the Wampanoag by members of the Plymouth Colony in 1652. During King Philip's War, English colonists residing in the area took shelter at Russell Garrison. Remains of the settlement can still be seen at the foot of Lucy Street.

In the mid-18th century, it became a shipbuilding center. In September 1778, during the American Revolution, British raiding parties attacked nearby New Bedford as part of Grey's raid with a small force attacking Padanaram. The village was then known as Akin’s Landing, and following Elihu Akin driving three Loyalists out of the village in September 1778, British raiders burnt down most of the village, focusing on Akin’s properties. The raiding parties targeted Akin specifically because he had expelled the Loyalists from Dartmouth. After the raid, Akin moved to his only remaining property, a small home on Potters Hill - the Elihu Akin House. Elihu never financially recovered from the raid and died poor; he lived at the house until his death in 1794. Fixing the damage to the town from the raid cost £105,960 in 1778, which is roughly equivalent to nine million dollars in today's money. In honor of Elihu, and to commemorate his earlier shipbuilding, the village of Padanaram was called Akin’s Wharf for 20 years after the war. The town prospered as a minor whaling port and was home to a large salt works during the 19th century. As these industries died out, "the village" (as it is referred to by locals) became mostly a residential area with several yachting businesses, galleries, eateries, and shops.

The town is also the location of the Southworth Library, which was built in the late 1880s and early 1890s.

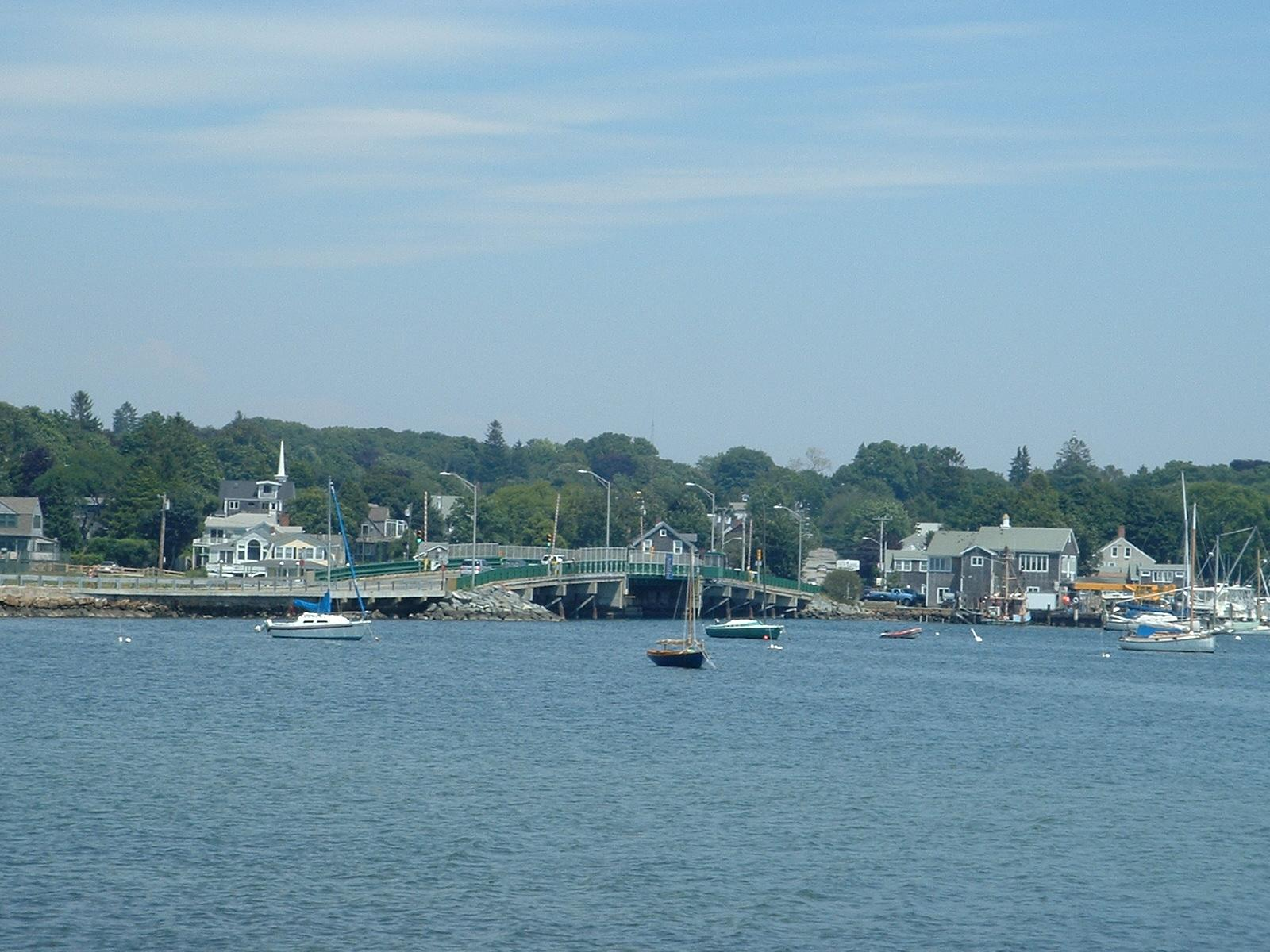
Padanaram Bridge

== New Bedford Yacht Club ==
The New Bedford Yacht Club, while founded in New Bedford, is now located in Padanaram. The club originally founded their headquarters on nearby Fish Island in 1877. Two years later, in 1879 in order to accommodate its growing membership, the club headquarters were moved to the larger neighboring Pope Island. In 1901, the club built the station in Padanaram. It replaced the Pope Island station as the main station of the club following the 1941 sale of the island. The New Bedford Yacht Club bi-annually hosts the Buzzards Bay Regatta.

== See also ==
- National Register of Historic Places listings in Bristol County, Massachusetts
