= Paul Cuffe =

American businessman (1759–1817)

Captain Paul Cuffee
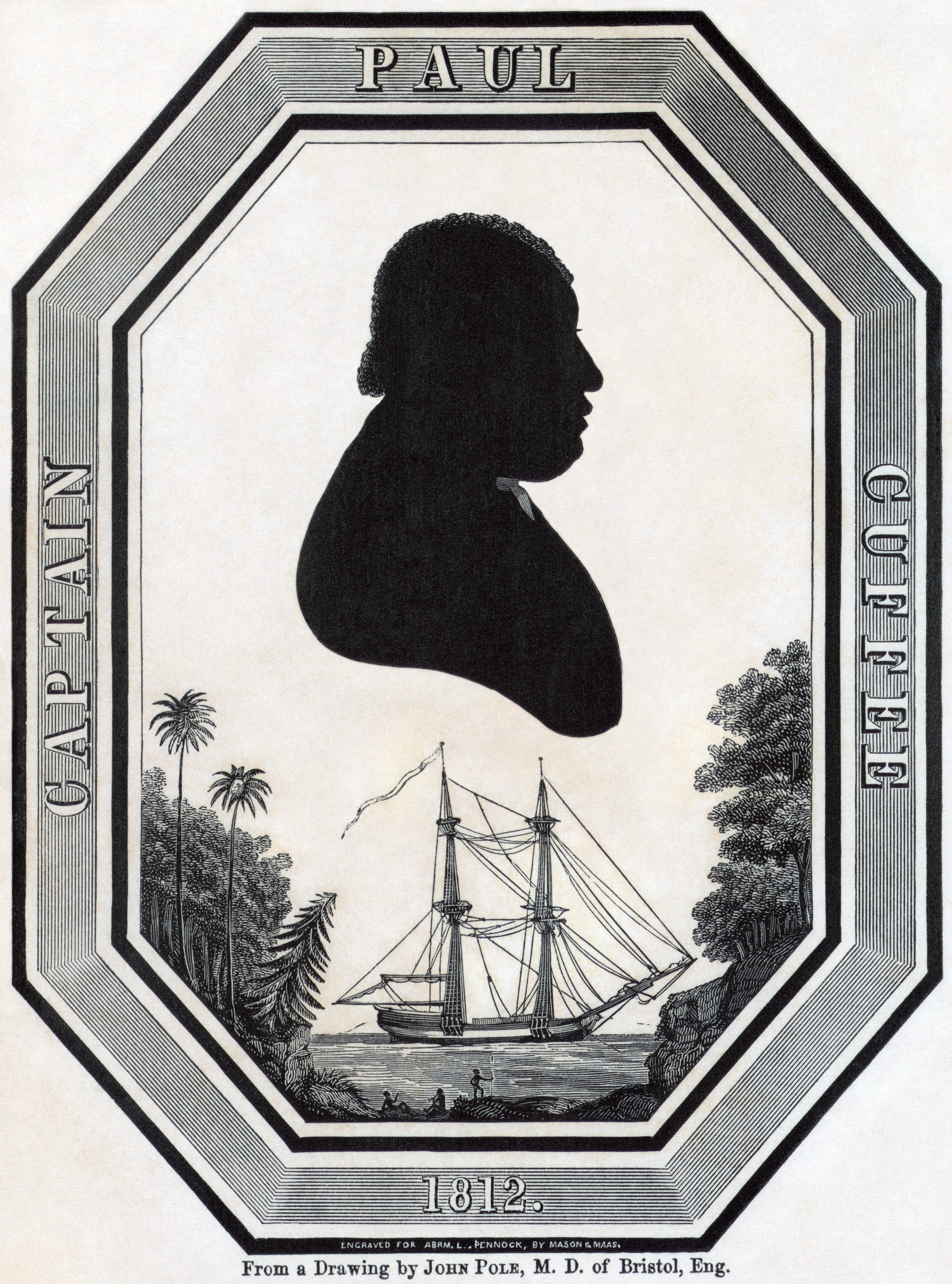
- Captain Paul Cuffee engraving, 1812, from a silhouette by Dr. John Pole of Bristol, England
- Born: January 17, 1759; Cuttyhunk Island, Massachusetts
- Died: September 7, 1817 (aged 58); Westport, Massachusetts
- Resting place: Westport Meeting House
- Spouse: Alice Abel Pequit
- Children: 7

Paul Cuffe, also known as Paul Cuffee (January 17, 1759 – September 7, 1817) was a Black American and Wampanoag businessman, whaler and abolitionist. Born free into a free people of color family on Cuttyhunk Island, Massachusetts, Cuffe became a successful merchant and sea captain. His mother, Ruth Moses, was a Wampanoag from Harwich, Cape Cod, and his father an Ashanti captured as a child in West Africa and sold into slavery in Newport, Rhode Island, about 1720. In the mid-1740s, his father was manumitted by his Quaker owner, John Slocum. His parents married in 1747 in Dartmouth, Massachusetts.

After Cuffe's father died when the youth was thirteen, he and his older brother, John, inherited the family farm (their mother had life rights). They resided there with their mother and three younger sisters. The following year Cuffe signed on to the first of three whaling voyages to the West Indies. During the Revolutionary War, Cuffe delivered goods to Nantucket by slipping through a British blockade on a small sailboat. After the war, he built a lucrative shipping business along the Atlantic Coast and in other parts of the world. He also built his own ships in a boatyard on the Westport River. In Westport, Massachusetts, he founded the first racially integrated school in the United States. Cuffe was also a member of Prince Hall Freemasonry.

A devout Quaker, Cuffe joined the Westport Friends Meeting in 1808. He often spoke at the Sunday services at the Westport Meeting House and also at other Quaker meetings in Philadelphia, Pennsylvania. In 1813, he donated half the money for a new meeting house in Westport, and oversaw the construction. The building still survives. Few Americans of color were admitted to the Friends Meeting at that time.

Cuffe became involved in the British effort to found a colony in Sierra Leone, to which the British had transported more than 1,000 former slaves originally from America. Some had been enslaved by American Patriots and had sought refuge and freedom behind British lines during the war. After the British were defeated, they took those former slaves first to Nova Scotia and London. Prodded by Black Loyalists such as Thomas Peters, who had agitated for a return to Africa, the British in 1792 offered the Nova Scotia blacks a chance to set up a colony of their own in Sierra Leone, where they resettled.

At the urging of leading British abolitionists, in 1810 Cuffe sailed to Sierra Leone to learn about conditions for the settlers and whether he could help them. He concluded that efforts should be made to increase the local production of exportable commodities and develop their own shipping capabilities rather than continuing to export freed slaves. Cuffe sailed to England to meet with members of The African Institution, who were also leading abolitionists. He offered his recommendations to improve the lives of all the people in Sierra Leone. His recommendations were well received in London and he subsequently made two more trips to Sierra Leone to try to implement them.

On his last trip in 1815–16, he transported nine families of free blacks from Massachusetts to Sierra Leone to assist and work with the former slaves and other local residents to develop their economy. Some historians relate Cuffe's work to the "Back to Africa" movement being promoted by the newly organized American Colonization Society (ACS). A group made up of both Northerners and Southerners, it was focused on resettling free blacks from the United States to Africa – eventually resulting in development of Liberia. The leaders of the ACS had sought Paul Cuffe's advice and support for their effort. After some hesitation, and given the strong objections by free blacks in Philadelphia and New York City to the ACS proposal, Cuffe chose not to support the ACS. He believed his efforts in providing training, machinery and ships to the people of Africa would enable them to improve their lives and rise in the world.

== Biography ==
=== Early life ===
Paul Cuffe was born on January 17, 1759, on Cuttyhunk Island, Massachusetts. He was the youngest son of Coffe (Kofi) Slocum and his wife Ruth Moses. Kofi was an Ashanti slave of Akan heritage. The Ashanti form of slavery was different from American chattel slavery in a number of ways. Ashanti slaves had legal rights, could own property, inherit property and marry, though they were also put to death upon the passing of their slave master.

At around 10 years of age, Kofi was either seized or sold to Fanti middlemen, the first step in the Atlantic slave trade. On the West African coast he was traded to representatives of the Royal African Company and shipped to Newport, Rhode Island, where he was purchased by Ebenezer Slocum, a Quaker farm owner in Dartmouth, Massachusetts. In 1742, Slocum sold Kofi to his nephew, John Slocum, for 150 pounds. John apparently intended to free Kofi after he had gained his purchase price in labor, and manumitted him around 1745.

Kofi took the last name of Slocum, his former owner. In 1746, he married Ruth Moses. She was a member of the Wampanoag Nation, and had been born and raised on Cape Cod.

At that time, Kofi was working as a paid laborer for Holder Slocum, the son of Peleg Slocum, who had a large farm in Dartmouth and also owned the westernmost Elizabeth Islands, off the south coast of Massachusetts. Holder Slocum and his neighbors transported sheep to those islands for grazing during the summer months. He hired Kofi Slocum to care for those sheep; in about 1750, Kofi moved with his family to the westernmost island, known as Cuttyhunk.

There he built a house and lived year-round with his family for the next 15 years. The last eight children of Coffe and Ruth were born on Cuttyhunk, including Paul, the seventh child and youngest of four boys. They had the only house and may have been the only full-time residents on Cuttyhunk. Members of the Wampanoag tribe likely lived, at least seasonally, on nearby islands in the Elizabeth chain and also on Martha's Vineyard. In 1766, Coffe and Ruth bought a 116-acre (0.47 km^{2}) farm in nearby Dartmouth, and moved to the mainland with their ten children in the spring of 1767.

Coffe Slocum died in 1772, when Paul was 13 years old. As their two eldest brothers by then had families of their own elsewhere, Paul and his brother John took over their father's farm operations. They also supported their mother and several sisters.

Around 1777–1778, when he was 19, Paul's older brother John decided to use a version of his father's first name, Coffe, as his last name. Several of his siblings did the same, but not all. Paul later signed his name on correspondence, deeds, and his will by spelling "Coffe", with a "u" instead of an "o". In the national census of 1790, 1800 and 1810 his last name is recorded as "Cuff"; census takers sometimes wrote only how names sounded and were not required to meet the people whose names they were recording. Paul's mother, Ruth Moses, died on January 6, 1787.

=== Time as a mariner ===
In 1773, the year after his father's death and again in 1775, Paul Cuffe sailed on whaling ships, getting a chance to learn navigation. In his journal, he identified as a marineer (mariner). In 1776, after the start of the Revolutionary War, he sailed on a whaler but it was captured by the British. He and the rest of the crew were held as prisoners of war for three months in New York City before being released. Cuffe returned to his family in what is now Westport, Massachusetts. In 1779, he and his brother David borrowed a small sailboat to reach the nearby islands. Although his brother was afraid to sail in dangerous seas, Cuffe set forth, probably with a friend as crew in 1779 to deliver cargo to Nantucket. He was waylaid by pirates on this and several subsequent voyages. Finally, he made a trip to Nantucket that turned a profit. He reportedly continued to make these trips to Nantucket throughout the war.

In 1780, at the age of 21, Paul and his brother John Cuffe refused to pay taxes because free blacks did not have the right to vote in Massachusetts. In 1780, they petitioned the council of Bristol County, Massachusetts, to end such taxation without representation, which had been an issue of colonists that led many to the Revolution. The petition was denied, but his suit contributed to the state legislature decision in 1783 to grant voting rights to all free male citizens of the state.

After the war ended, Cuffe entered into a partnership with his brother-in-law, Michael Wainer, to build ships and establish a shipping business along the Atlantic Coast. He gradually built up capital and expanded to a fleet of ships. After using open boats, he commissioned the 14- or 15-ton closed-deck ship Box Iron, and then an 18- to 20-ton schooner. In 1789 he and Wainer set up their own shipyard on the east bank of the Acoaxet River, in the new town of Westport which had been carved from Old Dartmouth. He continued to build ships for the next 25 years.

Paul's sister Mary had married Michael Wainer in 1772; they had seven sons together between 1773 and 1793. Many as men became crew members and even captains on ships owned by their father and uncle. Jeremiah Wainer and his two sons (Cuffe's great-nephews) were lost at sea in 1804 when one of the family ships went down.

=== Marriage and family ===
On February 25, 1783, Cuffe married the widow Alice Abel Pequit. Like Cuffe's mother, Alice was a Wampanoag woman. The couple settled first in an "Indian-style" house near Destruction Brook in Dartmouth and later in Westport, Massachusetts, where they raised their seven children: Naomi (born 1783), Mary (born 1785), Ruth (1788), Alice (1790), Paul Jr. (1792), Rhoda (1795), and William (1799). David, Jonathan, and John became farmers, married, and lived in West Point, New York. Of Cuffe's six daughters, four married, while two remained single.

=== Shipping ===
In 1787, Paul Cuffe and his brother-in-law, Michael Wainer (husband of Mary Slocum, his older sister and ten years older than Paul) built their first ship together, the 25-ton schooner Sunfish. It was the beginning of a long partnership between the two men and their families. Their next ship was the 40-ton schooner Mary that was built in their own boatyard on the Acoaxet River. They then sold the Mary and Sunfish to finance construction of the Ranger – a 69-ton schooner launched in 1796 again from Cuffe's shipyard in Westport. In 1799 Cuffe added to his shipyard property, increasing it from 0.22 acres to 0.33 acres to provide more room for both his family home and the boatyard.

By 1800 he had enough capital to build and hold a half-interest in the 162-ton barque Hero. At that time Cuffe was one of the wealthiest – if not the wealthiest – African American or Native American in the United States. His largest ship, the 268-ton Alpha, was built in 1806, and his favorite ship, the 109-ton brig Traveller the following year. In 1811, when Cuffe took the Traveller into Liverpool, The Times of London reported that it was probably the first vessel to reach Europe that was "entirely owned and navigated by Negroes."

=== Property purchases by Paul Cuffe ===
Paul Cuffe and his brother John inherited the 116-acre farm in Westport from their father. They subsequently divided it between them but Paul never seemed to show an interest in farming and left the management of the farming to his brother or later to tenants. Paul's first recorded property purchase in 1789 was the 0.22-acre lot on the Acoaxet River where he first located his boatyard and then his home. He added to that lot in 1799 by acquiring a 0.11-acre abutting property on the south side of his boatyard.

Also in 1799, Paul Cuffe bought two large properties from a Westport neighbor, Ebenezer Eddy. The first was the Eddy family homestead of 100-acres with a house and outbuildings that was some 300 yards south of his boatyard on the Acoaxet River. The following year Paul sold this property to his sister and brother-in-law, Mary and Michael Wainer, for the same price he had paid for it. In the deed it states that the Wainers were already living on the property. From this record it appears that Paul bought the property for the Wainers with the understanding that they would buy the property from him when they were able. Michael Wainer and Paul Cuffe remained partners, with Wainer's sons captaining and crewing most of the ships.

The second property that Paul purchased from the Eddy family in 1799 was a 40-acre lot several hundred yards north of his boatyard that had previously belonged to the Allen family and was known as "The Allen Lot." He appears to have leased this land out to others to farm and then willed it to his youngest son, William, along with money to build a house on it.

Some years later, in 1813, Paul purchased from David Soule a roughly 4-acre property abutting his boatyard and home on the north and west. This was property of only a little over 4 acres that he identified as his homestead and divided among his wife and children when he died in 1817.

Cuffe's landholdings and those of Michael Wainer are described in the Cole, Gifford, Slade listed and linked in the references.

=== Prior settlements of free blacks in Sierra Leone ===
In the eighteenth and nineteenth centuries, most White Americans believed that people of African descent were inferior to those of European descent. The Second Great Awakening, carried primarily by Quakers, Methodists, and Baptists from New England to the American South, had motivated some owners to manumit (free) their slaves after the Revolutionary War. As slavery continued after the Revolution, primarily in the South, prominent men such as Presidents Thomas Jefferson and James Madison, both slave owners, believed the emigration of free Blacks to colonies either within or outside the United States was the easiest and most realistic solution to the race problem in America. It was a means of providing an alternative for free blacks, rather than absorbing a large population of ex-slaves into the white community through emancipation.

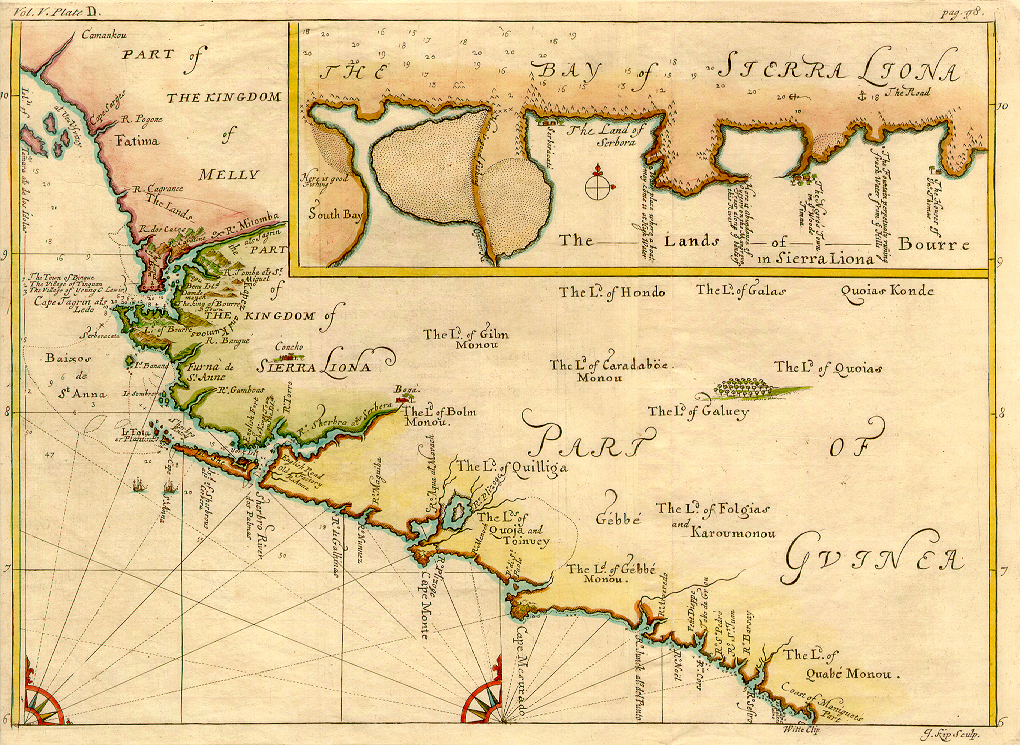
1732 map of Sierra Leone and the coast of Guinea

Attempts to settle American Blacks in other parts of the world had encountered many difficulties, including the British attempt to found a colony in Sierra Leone. Beginning in 1787, the Sierra Leone Company sponsored 400 people, mostly the "Black Poor" of London, to resettle in Freetown, Sierra Leone. Some were African Americans who had been freed from slavery by escaping to British lines during the Revolutionary War and then evacuated from American upon the war's conclusion. The Freetown colony struggled to establish a working economy and develop a government that could survive against outside pressures. After the financial collapse of the Sierra Leone Company, a second group, the newly-created African Institution, offered emigration to a larger group of Black Loyalists who had been resettled in Nova Scotia after the Revolutionary War. Many of the African Institution's sponsors hoped to gain an economic return from the colony.

The second wave of settlers in Sierra Leone consisted of some 1,200 free Blacks who, after England's defeat, had been transported by the Royal Navy from American port cities to Nova Scotia for resettlement. These people of color, mostly from the southern U.S. states, found Nova Scotia a very uncomfortable place, where they faced regular discrimination at the hands of the local white residents. John Clarkson, a young naval officer, and the younger brother of Thomas Clarkson, an ardent abolitionist, led the expedition of 15 ships from Nova Scotia to Freetown in the early months of 1792.

This group of settlers had formed communities and congregations in Nova Scotia and many of them were educated and skilled in farming and various crafts. John Clarkson carried through on the promised housing and land allotments so long as he remained in Freetown, through the end of 1792. But two issues arose that caused continuing conflict between the Nova Scotians and the English authorities. The Sierra Leone Company in London, that had supported the movement of the Free Blacks from Nova Scotia to Sierra Leone, had different goals than the new settlers. They wanted to establish a commercially viable plantation system, using the two groups of settlers as laborers. They also demanded quit-rents from those settlers who received land distributions, a condition that John Clarkson was unaware of. The settlers refused to pay such rents and this became a continuing source of conflict.

These grievances led the Black Nova Scotians to launch a revolt in 1800, a revolt that was only suppressed by the arrival of a new group of settlers from Nova Scotia known as "maroons." These were free blacks who had originally been brought as slaves to Jamaica in previous centuries but had managed to escape into the mountainous areas of that island where they had survived and governed themselves for over a century. This group of maroons were transported to Sierra Leone from Jamaica after the conclusion of the Second Maroon War.

A final group of settlers that were deposited in Sierra Leone in the years after 1807 were the Africans who had been freed by the British Royal Navy from slave ships that they captured after the British abolition of the slave trade in 1807. These freed blacks came from various areas along the West African coast.

=== Cuffe's first venture to Sierra Leone, in 1811 ===
Paul Cuffe had for some years taken an interest in the colonial settlements in Africa. One of his close Quaker friends and business partner, William Rotch Sr., had traveled to London shortly after the Revolutionary War ended at a time when there was much discussion in government and the press about the first settlement of blacks from Britain in Sierra Leone. When Rotch returned to America and settled in New Bedford he potentially informed Paul Cuffe about these undertakings. Subsequently Cuffe wrote as follows:

I have for these many years past felt a lively interest in their behalf, wishing that the inhabitants of the colony might become established in truth, and thereby be instrumental in its promotion amongst our African brethren.

From March 1807 on, Cuffe was encouraged by Quaker and abolitionist friends in Philadelphia, Baltimore, and New York City to help the fledgling efforts to improve Sierra Leone. Cuffe mulled over the logistics and chances of success for the movement before deciding in 1809 to join the project. On December 27, 1810, he left Philadelphia on his first expedition to Sierra Leone.

Cuffe reached Freetown, Sierra Leone, on March 1, 1811. He traveled the area and investigated the social and economic conditions of the region. He met with some of the colony's officials, who were opposed to American commercial vessels coming to Sierra Leone and competing with local merchants. His own attempts to sell goods yielded poor results, particularly because of high tariff charges on trade to and from the colony. On Sunday, April 7, 1811, Cuffe met with the foremost black entrepreneurs of the colony. Together, they wrote a petition for the African Institution in London, stating that the colony's greatest needs were for settlers to work in agriculture, merchandising, and the whaling industry, saying that these three areas would best facilitate the growth of the colony. Upon receiving this petition, the members of the Institution agreed with their findings. Cuffe and the black entrepreneurs together founded the Friendly Society of Sierra Leone as a mutual-aid merchant group dedicated to furthering prosperity and industry among the free peoples in the colony.

At the invitation of the African Institution, Cuffe sailed to Britain to secure further aid for the colony, arriving in Liverpool in July 1811. He was warmly received by the heads of the African Institution in London, and they raised some money for the Friendly Society. He was granted governmental permission and license to continue his mission in Sierra Leone. He also stayed with British officials and merchants in London and Liverpool, who were very hospitable and respectful of the intelligent, dedicated, and hard-working African-American Quaker merchant who was full of positive ideas about what might be done to improve the colony of Sierra Leone and bring development to the African people. Encouraged by this support, Cuffe returned to Sierra Leone, where he and black settlers solidified the role of the Friendly Society. They refined development plans for the colony including building a grist mill, saw mill, rice-processing factory, and salt works.

=== Embargo, President Madison, and the War of 1812 ===
Relations between the United States and Britain were strained and, as 1811 ended, the U.S. government established an embargo on British goods, including goods from Sierra Leone. This affected U.S. transatlantic trade, as well as trade with Canada. When Cuffe reached Newport in April 1812, his ship the Traveller was seized by U.S. customs agents, along with all its goods. Officials would not release his cargo, so Cuffe went to Washington, D.C., to appeal. He was able to meet with Secretary of the Treasury Albert Gallatin and President James Madison. Madison warmly welcomed Cuffe into the White House. This may have been the first time an African American had been a guest in the White House. Deciding that Cuffe had not intentionally violated the embargo, Madison ordered his cargo returned to him.

Madison also questioned Cuffe about his time in Sierra Leone and conditions there. Eager to learn about Africa, Madison was interested in the possibility of expanding colonization there by free American blacks. The strained diplomatic situation with Britain erupted into the War of 1812. Despite this, it has been suggested that Madison regarded Cuffe as the leading U.S. authority on Africa at that time.

Cuffe intended to return to Sierra Leone regularly, but in June 1812 the war started. As a Quaker pacifist, Cuffe opposed the war on moral grounds. He also despaired of the interruption of trade and efforts to improve Sierra Leone. As the war between the United States and Britain continued, Cuffe tried convincing both countries to ease their restrictions on trading, and allow him to continue trading with Sierra Leone. His petition to the U.S. Congress was acted on favorably in the Senate, but rejected in the House, that was dominated by representatives from the South. Like other merchants, he was forced to wait until the war ended.

Meanwhile, Cuffe visited Baltimore, Philadelphia, and New York, speaking to groups of free blacks about the colony. Cuffe also urged blacks to form Friendly Societies in these cities, communicate with each other, and correspond with the African Institution and with the Friendly Society in Sierra Leone. He printed a pamphlet about Sierra Leone to inform the general public of the conditions in the colony and his ideas about bringing progress there. At home in 1813, Cuffe worked mainly on the rebuilding of the Westport Friends Meeting House and contributed roughly half the cost of that project.

The war caused Cuffe to lose ships and he suffered financially. The Hero was declared not seaworthy while in Chile and never returned home. John James of Philadelphia, his managing partner in the Alpha, was losing money in the ship's operations. Fortunately the war ended with the Treaty of Ghent at the end of 1814. After getting his finances in order, Cuffe prepared to return to Sierra Leone.

=== After the war ===
Cuffe sailed out of Westport on December 10, 1815, with thirty-eight free black colonists: eighteen adults and twenty children, ranging in age from eight months to sixty years old. The group included William Gwinn and his family from Boston.

The expedition cost Cuffe more than $4,000 (equivalent to $70,000 in 2025). Passengers' fares, plus a donation by William Rotch, Jr. of New Bedford, covered the remaining $1,000 cost. The colonists arrived in Sierra Leone on February 3, 1816. The ship was carrying such supplies as axes, hoes, a plow, a wagon, and parts to build a sawmill. Cuffe and his immigrants were not greeted as warmly as Cuffe had been previously. Governor MacCarthy of Sierra Leone was already having trouble keeping the general population in order, and was not excited at the idea of more immigrants. In addition, the Militia Act, which had been imposed upon the colony, required all adult males to swear an oath of allegiance to the Crown. Many local people refused to do so for fear of being drafted into military service. In addition, his cargo sold at undervalued prices. But the new colonists were finally settled in Freetown. Cuffe believed that once regular trade between the United States, Europe, and Africa began, the society would prosper.

For Cuffe, though, the expedition was costly. Each colonist needed a year's provisions to get started, which he had advanced to them. Governor MacCarthy was sure that the African Institution would reimburse Cuffe, but they did not, and he lost over $8,000 (equivalent to $151,765 in 2025) after having to pay high tariff duties as well. The African Institution never reimbursed Cuffe for the mission, and Cuffe had to deal with mounting economic issues. He knew he needed stronger financial backing before undertaking another such expedition.

=== Later years ===
On his return to New York in 1816, Cuffe exhibited to the New York chapter of the African Institution the certificates of the landing of those colonists at Sierra Leone. "He has also received from Gov. MacCarthy a certificate of the steady and sober conduct of the settlers since their arrival, and an acknowledgment of $439.62 advanced to them since they landed, to promote their comfort and advantage."

During this time period, many African Americans became interested in emigrating to Africa, and some people believed this was the best solution to the problem of racial tension in American society. Cuffe was persuaded by Reverends Samuel J. Mills and Robert Finley to provide information and advice to the American Colonization Society (ACS), formed for this purpose. Cuffe was alarmed at the overt racism displayed by many members of the ACS, who included slaveholders. Certain co-founders, particularly Henry Clay, advocated relocating freed Blacks as a way of ridding the American South of "potentially troublesome agitators" who might disrupt their slave societies. Other Americans preferred the emigration to Haiti. The Haitian government of President Jean-Pierre Boyer encouraged American immigrants, believing they could help the country develop and gain recognition by the United States government (which did not happen until 1861, when the Southern politicians who controlled the government withdrew en masse to form the Confederacy).

=== Death and legacy ===
In early 1817, Cuffe's health deteriorated. He never returned to Africa, and died in Westport on September 7, 1817. His last words were "Let me pass quietly away." Cuffe left an estate with an estimated value of almost $20,000 (equivalent to $533,000 in 2025). His will bequeathed property and money to his widow, siblings, children, grandchildren, the widow and heirs of Benjamin Cook, and the Friends Meeting House in Westport. He is buried in the graveyard behind the Westport Friends Meeting House and his wife was later buried next to him. A crowd of more than 200 friends, relatives, and admirers gathered for the ceremony and his long-time friend and contemporary, William Rotch Jr., delivered one of the eulogies at the event. The following month, Reverend Peter Williams Jr. offered an extended eulogy at the African Methodist Episcopal Zion Church in New York.

Henry Noble Sherwood, who wrote one of the first biographies about Paul Cuffe that is included in the references and further reading, summed up his life in the final paragraph of that work as follows:

"Overwhelming his industry, his religion and education stands his optimism. He believed in the victory of righteousness; therefore, he worked for it. He believed in the triumph of truth; therefore, he dedicated himself to it. He realized the mastery of poverty; therefore, he gave pursuit to wealth. He believed in the amelioration of his race; therefore, he consecrated himself to it." (Sherwood, Paul Cuffe, p. 229.)

== Legacy and honors ==
- On January 16, 2009, Congressman Barney Frank inserted extended remarks titled "Paul Cuffe: Voting Rights Pioneer" into the Congressional Record.
- Governor Deval Patrick of Massachusetts issued a proclamation honoring the 250th anniversary of the birthday of Paul Cuffe on January 17, 2009, by declaring it Paul Cuffe Day in Massachusetts.
- The Massachusetts State House and Senate issued citations on January 17, 2009, honoring Paul Cuffe's birth.
- On September 7, 2017, Governor Charlie Baker of Massachusetts issued a proclamation honoring the 200th anniversary of Paul Cuffe's death by making that date Paul Cuffe Day in Massachusetts.
- The Massachusetts House and Senate issued citations on September 7, 2017, honoring the 200th anniversary of Paul Cuffe's death.
- The New Bedford Whaling Museum opened the Captain Paul Cuffe Park at the corner of Water and Union Streets in 2018.
- The Paul Cuffe Symposium Committee Inaugurated the Paul Cuffe Heritage Trail celebrating Native American and African American Heritage from New Bedford to Westport on September 7, 2017, which honors Cuffee Slocum, Paul Cuffe, and Michael Wainer.
- The Paul Cuffee Maritime Charter School for Providence Youth was established in 2001 in Providence, Rhode Island.
- The Paul Cuffe Math-Science Technology Academy ES was established in 2003 in Chicago, Illinois, replacing the Cuffe Elementary School.

== See also ==
- Absalom Boston, the first African-American captain to sail a whaleship, with an all-black crew
- Lewis Temple, best remembered for the invention of "Temple's Toggle" or "Temple's blood" which was a harpoon toggle tip based upon Eskimo and Indian harpoon tips brought back to New England by Whalers in 1835
