= Southworth Library =

Southworth Library may refer to:

- Southworth Library (Dartmouth, Massachusetts)
- Southworth Library (Dryden, New York)
