= Grey's raid =

1778 military engagement during the American Revolutionary War

Coordinates: 41°38′10″N 70°56′05″W

- Part of the American Revolutionary War
- 1779 map of Eastern Massachusetts
Date	September 5–12, 1778
Location	New Bedford, Fairhaven and Martha's Vineyard
Result	British victory

Belligerents
Great Britain	United States

Commanders and leaders
Charles Grey	Israel Fearing

Strength
4,000 regulars	150+ militia

Casualties and losses
1 killed 4 wounded 16 missing	4 killed 16 captured

Grey's raid was a series of raids carried out in Massachusetts by British forces under the command of Major-General Charles Grey in September 1778 during the American Revolutionary War. Grey, leading 4,000 troops, raided the towns of New Bedford and Fairhaven along with Martha's Vineyard as part of the northern theater of the American Revolutionary War after Saratoga. The raids were one of the first in a series of attacks executed by the British against American coastal communities.

Grey's force was originally intended as a relief force for the British garrison at Newport, Rhode Island that was briefly under siege, but they arrived after the American besiegers had already retreated. General Sir Henry Clinton diverted Grey's troops to carry out raids instead. On September 5 and 6, Grey raided New Bedford and Fairhaven, encountering significant resistance only in Fairhaven. His troops destroyed storehouses, shipping, and supplies in New Bedford, where they met with light resistance from the local militia; they damaged fewer American holds at Fairhaven where militia resistance had additional time to organize. He then sailed for Martha's Vineyard, which was undefended. Between September 10 and 15, its residents surrendered 10,000 head of sheep and 300 oxen, as well as most of the island's weapons.

== Background ==
In December 1776, British forces occupied Newport, Rhode Island. American forces in New England were not strong enough to dislodge the garrison there, which was also supported by Royal Navy vessels that used Newport as a base. This situation changed in 1778, following the entry of France into the war, when the French and Americans agreed to embark on joint operations against the British. The French sent a fleet under the command of French Admiral comte d'Estaing to provide troops and naval support. The fleet arrived off the coast of New York City in July 1778 but found the port well-defended, and d'Estaing further believed that its bar would be too shallow for his largest ships to cross. He then sailed instead for Newport, where he and General John Sullivan prepared to besiege the British garrison.

In response to the threat to Newport, General Sir Henry Clinton ordered 4,000 men under General Charles Grey to prepare for transport to Rhode Island, while Admiral Lord Richard Howe sailed from New York to oppose d'Estaing. D'Estaing sailed out of Newport's harbor on August 10, preparing to do battle with Howe. As the fleets maneuvered for position, a storm arose that scattered and damaged both fleets. D'Estaing then decided to abandon Newport and sailed for Boston to make repairs. By then, General Sullivan had already begun siege operations against Newport without French assistance, which prompted Clinton to order Grey's force to sail for Newport on August 26, and Clinton accompanied the force. It made slow progress, however, due to contrary winds, arriving in Newport on September 1, and the Americans had already retreated from the island after the inconclusive Battle of Rhode Island on August 29, 1778.

Rather than disembark Grey's troops at Newport, Clinton decided to pursue other objectives. His orders issued in March 1778 included instructions to raid coastal communities, destroying shipbuilding facilities and supplies. Subsequently, he ordered the fleet to sail to New London, Connecticut, a potential raiding site. He found too few ships there to merit landing, however, and ordered Grey to "proceed without loss of time to the eastward" to raid New Bedford and Fairhaven on the Massachusetts mainland, as well as the island of Martha's Vineyard.

== New Bedford and Fairhaven ==
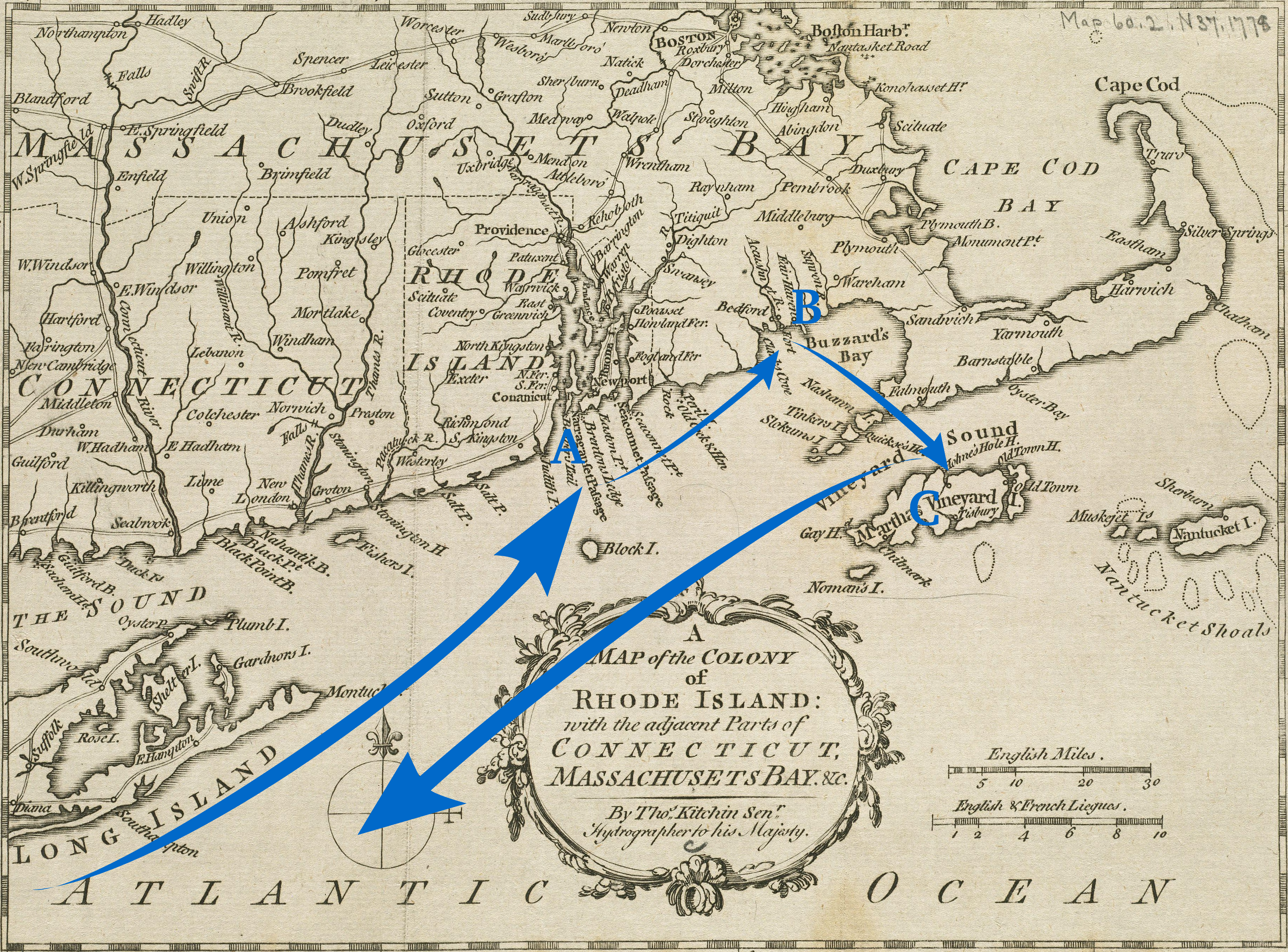
A 1778 map annotated to show the expedition's general route: A marks Newport, Rhode Island, B marks New Bedford and Fairhaven, Massachusetts, and C marks Martha's Vineyard.

Early on September 4, Grey's fleet sailed for Buzzard's Bay led by the Royal Navy frigate Carysfort under Captain Robert Fanshawe. They encountered Lord Howe's fleet en route, and the earl agreed to remain near Block Island until the raids were completed. The Carysfort arrived in Buzzard's Bay that afternoon but managed to strike rocks—twice; however, neither incident was serious, and the fleet proceeded up the Acushnet River toward New Bedford and Fairhaven. That evening, Grey landed his troops at Clark's Point on the west bank of the river. They spent the night and the next morning destroying vessels, warehouses, and wharves "in the whole Extent of the Accushnet River". Many of the ships destroyed were prizes captured by privateers operating out of the two towns. The raiding parties set fire to many ships, and the resulting conflagration also destroyed homes and houses of worship and was bright enough to be seen in Newport, some 20 miles (32 km) away.

During the raid, a British raiding party also entered the village of Padanaram in Dartmouth, Massachusetts. The village was then known as Akin's Landing, and the attacks were a direct result of local resident Elihu Akin forcibly expelling three Loyalists out of the village in September 1778. The three men led the British to the village, and the raiding party focused on Akin's properties. The raiders targeted Akin specifically as an act of revenge for his expulsion of the Loyalists from Dartmouth. After the raid, Akin moved to his only remaining property, a small home on Potters Hill - the Elihu Akin house. Elihu never financially recovered from the raid and died poor, he lived at the house all the way until his death in 1794. Fixing the damage to the town from the raid cost £105,960 in 1778, which is roughly equivalent to nine million dollars in today's money. In honor of Elihu, and to commemorate his earlier shipbuilding, the village of Padanaram was called Akin's Wharf for 20 years after the war.

A 38-man artillery garrison was manning a small fort on the Fairhaven side of the river (today known as Fort Phoenix), and they fired on the British ships during the evening, then spiked the fort's guns and abandoned it, leaving their colors flying. The British briefly returned fire and then destroyed the fort's guns. Grey's troops marched around the head of the Acushnet River and camped on the eastern banks. The following day, they embarked on their boats, but General Grey decided that Fairhaven should also be raided. Concurrently, American militiamen were beginning to arrive to defend Fairhaven, with Major Israel Fearing taking command from an elderly colonel who was reluctant to pursue an active defense. British raiding parties approached Fairhaven on the morning of September 6, and Fearing arrayed about 150 men between the village and their landing point. Raiders set fire to a few nearby buildings and then headed for the village. At this point, Fearing's men unleashed a withering volley of musket fire, and the British withdrew to their boats.

== Martha's Vineyard ==
Grey sent his aide Captain John André to New York to request transports for livestock, then set sail for Martha's Vineyard. Contrary winds slowed the fleet's progress, and it did not reach the harbor at Holmes Hole (present-day Vineyard Haven) until September 10. Because of the bad winds, Grey abandoned the idea of raiding Nantucket and focused on acquiring livestock on Martha's Vineyard.

A deputation of three citizens came to the Carysfort to see what the British wanted, and Grey made his demands: he wanted the militia's weapons, any public funds, 300 oxen, and 10,000 sheep. He threatened to land his troops and seize these items if they were not delivered up. After two days, the islanders had driven 6,000 sheep and 130 oxen to Grey's fleet. Dissatisfied with their pace of action, Grey landed small contingents of troops on September 12 to accelerate the process and to destroy vessels found in the area. By the 14th, he had received all 10,000 sheep and 300 oxen, as well as local militia weapons and £950 intended as a tax payment for the Second Continental Congress. Grey sailed from Martha's Vineyard on September 15, and reached New York City two days later.

== Aftermath ==
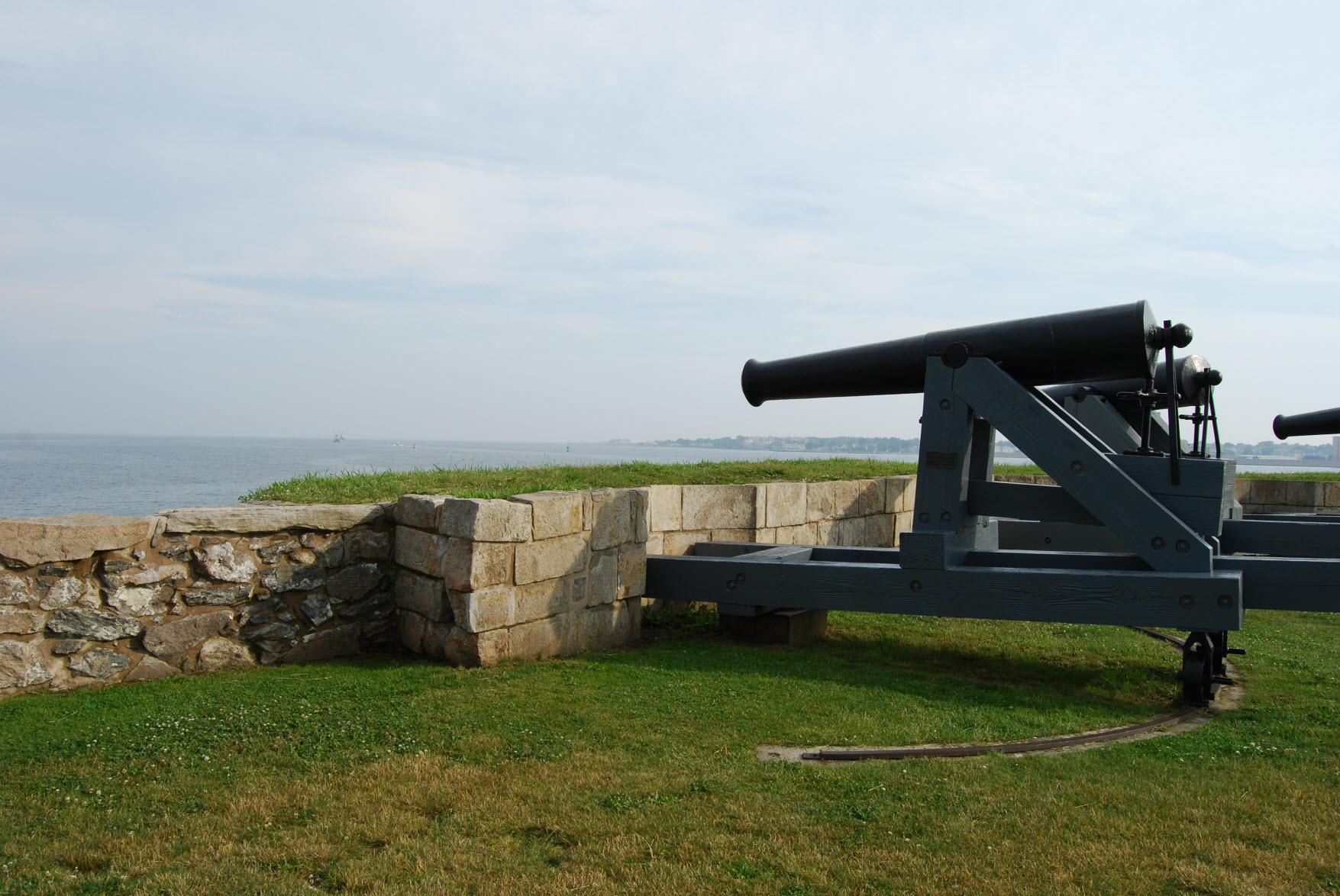
View from Fort Phoenix

Grey's report on the expedition lists one man killed, four wounded, and sixteen missing. He reported that the defenders had four men killed; he also took sixteen prisoners in New Bedford to exchange for his missing. The raid was followed by others (not led by Grey): one against Little Egg Harbor, New Jersey in October 1778, and two in 1779 against communities on Chesapeake Bay and the Connecticut shore. In 1781 a raiding expedition led by turncoat General Benedict Arnold began the decisive Yorktown campaign in Virginia; Arnold also led another raid in September 1781 against New London and Groton, Connecticut (not far from where he grew up) that was notorious for its severity.

In New Bedford eleven houses, 21 shops, 34 ships of various size, and one ropewalk were destroyed, along with goods and naval stores. Estimates of the damage done there and at Fairhaven ranged from £20,000 to nearly £100,000, the most costly damage was to ships and goods. The residents of Martha's Vineyard petitioned for compensation of over £10,000 due to the losses incurred in the raid. General Clinton's successor, Sir Guy Carleton made payment of £3,000 against these claims.

The fort at the mouth of the Acushnet River was rebuilt and named Fort Phoenix. It was manned in the War of 1812, and is now listed on the National Register of Historic Places.
