= Richard Albert Canfield =

American businessman (1855–1914)

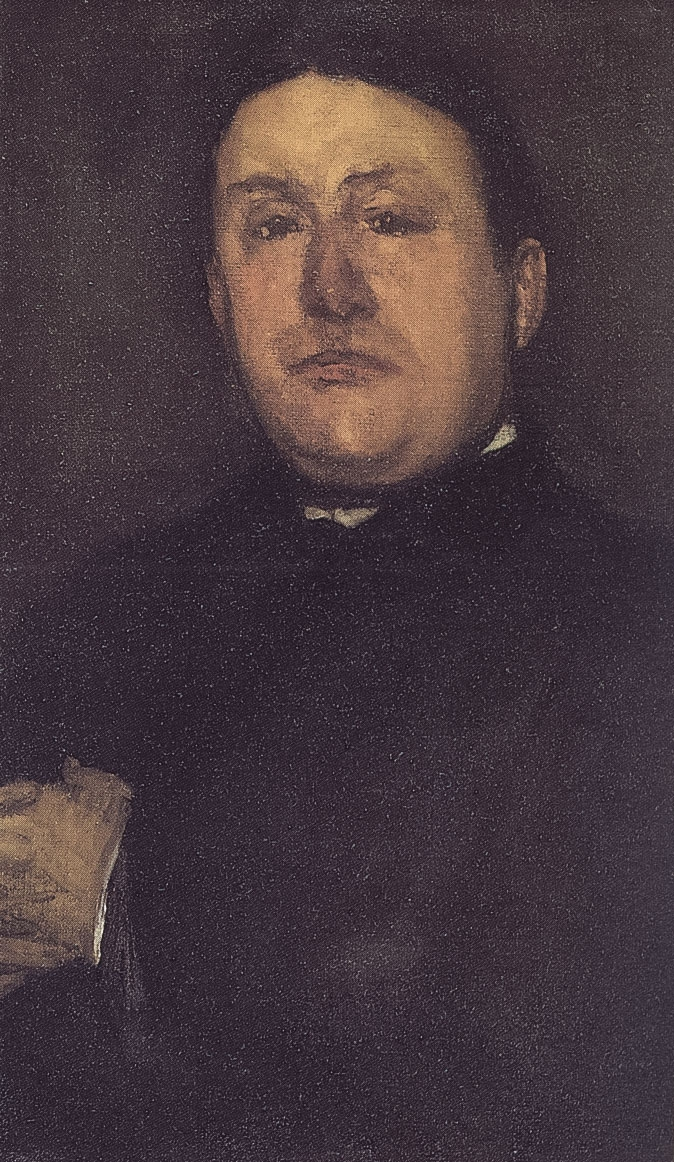
- Portrait of Richard A. Canfield by James McNeill Whistler c. 1901-1903
- Born: June 1855; New Bedford, Massachusetts, US
- Died: December 11, 1914 (aged 59); New York City, US
- Burial place: Oak Grove Cemetery

Richard Albert Canfield (June 17, 1855 (birth record) or June 28, 1855 (grave) – December 11, 1914) was a prominent American businessman and art collector involved in illegal gambling throughout the northeastern United States during the late 19th and early 20th century. Known as the "Prince of Gamblers", Canfield was one of the earliest to develop the modern day "resort casino". The solitaire game Canfield is named in his honor.

== Biography ==
Canfield was born in New Bedford, Massachusetts. He was a direct descendant of Elihu Akin, and when he was thirteen years old, he spent the summer with his grandmother at the Elihu Akin House in Dartmouth, Massachusetts. Canfield worked in various jobs prior to running a small faro parlor in Pawtucket, Rhode Island which eventually led to his arrest. Despite this, he soon established another gambling parlor and became a well-known gambling operator in Providence, Rhode Island before moving to New York in the 1880s. Once there, he operated Canfield's Clubhouse at 5 East 44th Street next to the famous Delmonico's Restaurant. During the next twenty years, his high-stakes gambling resorts would become popular in New York's underworld. Repeated raids by New York district attorney W.T. Jerome during the early 1900s forced Canfield to close his New York casinos in 1904.

In 1882, Canfield married Genevieve Wren Martin of Providence, Rhode Island. Genevieve Canfield would outlive her husband by four decades. The Canfields had two children: a daughter, Grace Martin Canfield (who had one son, Martin E. Hannon Jr., by her first marriage to Martin E. Hannon Sr.) and a son, Howland D. Canfield, who died at the age of twenty-three.

In 1893, Richard Albert Canfield took a partnership in the Saratoga Clubhouse in Saratoga Springs, New York and bought it outright the following year for $250,000. Business was lucrative and he became an extremely wealthy man. However, gambling was illegal in the United States and in 1885 he served a six-month sentence in Rhode Island jail for violating gaming laws. Canfield invested an estimated $800,000 in enhancing the building and the grounds of Congress Park to bring them up to the standards of the top European establishments. In 1902–3, he added a dining room to the back of the Clubhouse fitting it with stained glass windows and an early form of air conditioning. He ordered marble statuary for the Italian gardens in the northeast corner of Congress Park. The elegant atmosphere made the cream of society feel welcome to bet their money on the Clubhouses's many games of chance. Canfield was recognized as the King of the Gamblers; Saratoga Springs was seen as the American Monte Carlo. In Saratoga Springs, he kept the Clubhouse going until 1907. The clientele during this period included not only members of wealthy families like the Whitneys, Vanderbilts and J. P. Morgan's, but gambling legends like Diamond Jim Brady and John Warne "Bet-a-Million" Gates, and prominent entertainers like Gates' girlfriend Lillian Russell and impresario Florenz Ziegfeld. This socially distinctive era, regarded as the city's golden age, ended in 1907 when reformers succeeded in banning gambling in the city. Canfield retired and sold the hotel and grounds to the city four years later, in 1911. The Pure Food and Drug Act hurt sales of bottled Saratoga Water, and the year after buying from Canfield, the city bought the Congress Hall hotel and bottling plant and demolished them. The Canfield Casino in Saratoga Springs now houses the Historical Society.

Canfield owned a number of fashionable gambling houses in New York, Rhode Island, Saratoga Springs and Newport. In December 1902 his New York clubhouse at 5 East 44th Street in Manhattan was raided, and Canfield, who was not actually arrested, escaped to England where he lived for the next four and half months.

Canfield's friend and fellow businessman, Charles Lang Freer, introduced Canfield to James Abbott McNeill Whistler in 1899. As a personal friend and patron of Whistler's, Canfield possessed the second largest and most important Whistler collection in the world prior to his death. A few months before his death, he sold his collection of etchings, lithographs, drawings and paintings by Whistler to the American art dealer Roland F. Knoedler for $300,000. Three of Canfield's Whistler paintings hang in the Frick Museum in New York City. Canfield came to own a number of paintings by Whistler. In May 1901 Canfield commissioned a portrait from Whistler. He started to pose for Portrait of Richard A. Canfield (YMSM 547) in March 1902. According to Alexander Gardiner, Canfield returned to Europe to sit for Whistler at the New Year in 1903, and sat every day until 16 May 1903. However, Whistler was ill and frail at this time and the work was his last completed portrait. The deceptive air of respectability that the portrait gave Canfield caused Whistler to call it 'His Reverence'. The two men were in correspondence from 1901 until Whistler's death.

Canfield advised his friend Charles Freer with the donation of Freer's extensive art collection to the Smithsonian Institution for the Freer Gallery of Art in 1906. The famous Whistler collection of Canfield's was the second largest in the country and sold to M. Knoedler Co. in 1914 - 34 of Canfield's Whistlers - oils, water colors, pastels, pen and ink and pencil drawings - but not the portrait of Richard himself. Whistler and Richard were very close friends. Whistler's last work was of Canfield whom he called teasingly, "His Reverence".

Canfield was a man of culture with refined tastes in art. He owned early American and Chippendale furniture, tapestries, Chinese porcelain and Barye bronzes. He was known to be witty. He was a heavy drinker and overweight.

In his later years, Canfield owned and operated the Union Stopper Company, manufacturing stoppers for whiskey bottles, which turned into a successful glass-making business, Beaumont Glass Company in Morgantown, West Virginia.

In December 1914, he was seriously injured in a fall at the New York City Subway station on 14th Street. He died later that night from a fractured skull sustained in the fall. After his death on December 11, he was cremated and his ashes brought back to New Bedford, where they were interred in the family plot in the Old Section of Oak Grove Cemetery in New Bedford.
