= William Gwinn =

African-American Western African resettler figure

William Gwinn (Guinn, Guin; c. 1755–?) was an African American from Boston, Massachusetts. He was one of the first African-Americans to participate in the antebellum American Back-to-Africa movement under the auspices of Captain Paul Cuffe's 1815 voyage to Sierra Leone.

== Early life ==
Little is known of Gwinn's early life. Presumably, he was previously enslaved to the Massachusetts Gwinn family or had immigrated from the Southern states after being emancipated. By the early 1800s, he was a free black and lived in antebellum Massachusetts. He was listed in the 1810 census as a resident of Boston Ward 1 in Suffolk County, Massachusetts. He was described as being of the 'Methodist order' and as being "from Boston" by Captain Paul Cuffe.

== Emigration to Sierra Leone ==
=== The journey ===
In 1815, at age sixty, Gwinn decided to immigrate with his 56-year-old wife Elizabeth and 17-year-old daughter Nancy Gwinn to Sierra Leone. The Gwinn family was one of eight families to emigrate to Sierra Leone under the auspices of Paul Cuffe. Cuffe, a man of Native American and African American ancestry, had visited Sierra Leone in 1811 to assess whether he'd like to immigrate there. His Native American wife, however, did not want to leave the land of her ancestry. He returned four years later with thirty-eight African Americans.

The emigrants, mainly Bostonians, were the first black Americans to immigrate on a large scale directly from the United States to Africa. The Gwinns traveled to Sierra Leone in Cuffe's Traveller and did not pay for expenses. They were expected to work on Governor Charles MacCarthy's farm once they arrived in Sierra Leone. According to records in the Massachusetts Historical Society, William Gwinn traveled to Sierra Leone "with his wife and two Children."

=== Settlement ===
The group arrived in Sierra Leone about the end of January or early February. Cuffe wrote to the African Institution in London's William Allen on April 1, 1816, to inform him that homesteads had been acquired for the settlement. Gwinn worked on a 10-acre farm with five families from Boston.

29 people that were going to work the 10 acres together included:

- Thomas Jarvis, his wife and five children. Jarvis was about 50.
- Peter Wilcox, his wife and five children. Wilcox was about 40.
- Robert Rigsby, his wife and one child
- William Guinn, his wife and daughter

Another settler was David George, a Baptist preacher who had escaped enslavement and then traveled to Nova Scotia before emigrating to Sierra Leone.

The same year, Gwinn's daughter Nancy married George Davis, the African-born son of African American parents who had immigrated via Nova Scotia (under the auspices of John Clarkson) to found Freetown, Sierra Leone in 1792.

=== Integration with 1792 Nova Scotian Settlers ===
Most of the thirty-eight emigrants integrated with the founders (known as the Settlers of the Colony of Sierra Leone, who had arrived in 1792).

=== Later years and descendants ===
Little is known of what became of Gwinn himself; however, a letter from other colonists indicated that 'Friend Gwinn' had lost a leg since arriving in Sierra Leone. Gwinn likely settled in Settler Town as that was where the original "American emigrants reside."

The Gwinns have descendants in Sierra Leone and the United States through the union of George Davis I to Miss Nancy Gwinn in 1816.

== Sources ==
- James Oliver Horton; Lois E. Horton (1999). Black Bostonians: family life and community struggle in the antebellum North. Holmes & Meier. ISBN 978-0-8419-1380-6.
- Henry Noble Sherwood (1923). Paul Cuffe. Association for the Study of Negro Life and History.
- Massachusetts Historical Society (1969). Proceedings. The Society.
