= Peleg Slocum =

Quaker from colonial Rhode Island

Rev. Peleg Slocum
- Born: 1654; Portsmouth, Rhode Island
- Died: 1732 (aged 77–78); Dartmouth, Massachusetts
- Burial place: Apponagansett Friends Cemetery, Dartmouth Massachusetts

Peleg Slocum (1654–1732/1733) was a Quaker from Portsmouth, Rhode Island, he was a proprietor of Dartmouth, Massachusetts and sole owner of Cuttyhunk Island.

== Life ==
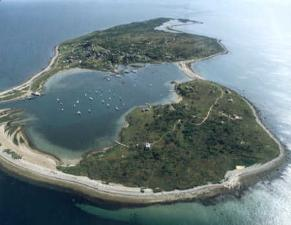
Cuttyhunk Island

=== Illicit activity ===
Despite being known as an “honest publick [sic.] Friend,” Slocum was also known to be a smuggler and a profitable contraband trader, posing as being on religious missions, Slocum would use his boat to transport felonious goods. Slocum's criminal activity was so great that he was able to, at the age of 23, put up 2000 pounds to purchase a farm. Slocum also found himself on the wrong side of the law in white-collar, and religious situations. He was a defendant against a claim that he and other Dartmouth proprietors refused to divide land. He also had eighty of his sheep, as well as his land on the Elizabeth Islands seized for refusing to contribute, and pay a tax, to build a Presbyterian Church at Chilmark. John Tucker was also punished for refusing to pay the tax. He had a horse and heifer seized to pay the rates. He was called before his monthly church meeting for the transgression of being at a "place of dancing and music."

=== Family ===
Slocum married his wife Mary Holder, daughter of Christopher Holder a Quaker evangelist, in 1681. With Mary he had ten children, including Holder Slocum. He was the son of Giles and Joan Slocum.

=== Cuttyhunk island ===
In 1693 Slocum obtained Cuttyhunk Island, a small island off of the Massachusetts Southeast coast, as well as the surrounding islands Nashawena and Penikese. Slocum purchased the island from the combined holdings of Ralph Earle Jr., his brother William, and Peleg Sanford. He reportedly used Cuttyhunk to graze sheep, since he didn't need walls to confine the flock. During Slocum's ownership period the Island was known as Slocum's Island.

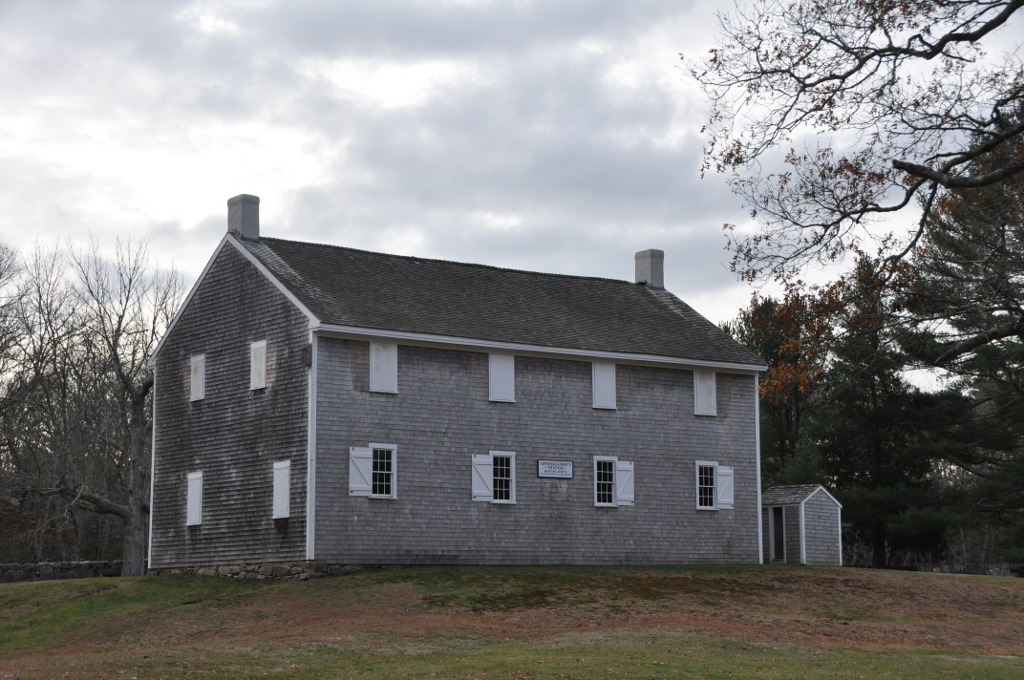
The Apponegansett Meeting House

=== Religion ===
Slocum was known as a devout Quaker. He routinely held meetings of the local Friends in his Dartmouth home - all the way until 1703. He held every recorded meeting during 1699, 1700, 1702 and during 1703 until the meeting house was finished. The last recorded date being the 24th day of the 3rd month on the Quaker Calendar. In the texts his name was listed as Slocumb, Slocom, and Slocum. Slocum, along with Increes Allin were chosen to "Inspect in to the lives and conversations of friends for the following month" in 1703. In 1703 he was also chosen twice to attend quarterly meetings. In 1704 he was chosen to attend a quarterly meeting, look in to the local Quakers lives, and attended the Quaker yearly meeting in Salem, Massachusetts with John Tucker. He was also chosen to speak with a Quaker about his disorderly speeches at the town house, and Slocum was chastised for speaking out of turn about a bill. He was then chosen to attend another local monthly meeting and a yearly meeting in Sandwich, Massachusetts. In 1705 he went on a variety of trips to talk to local Quakers on behalf of the congregation. In 1706 he went to Rochester, Massachusetts after not attending a slew of monthly meetings to talk to the Friends there. At the end of the year he attended two more quarterly meetings. In 1707 he attended two quarterly meetings in Rhode Island. and one other quarterly meeting as well. He was also chosen as an overseer for a Dartmouth Meeting. In 1708 he attended more quarterly meetings and a yearly meeting. He was also asked about renewing his deed on the land the meeting house was built. He was not willing to. This followed a reported clash with other Dartmouth Quakers, including his brother. Slocum refused to stand during an award ceremony, was absent from several meetings, and acted in an aggressive way at other Quaker meetings he attended. Following his disagreement with the Quakers in 1708 his name was absent from all meetings in 1709, and 1710. He then attended 3 meetings over the years 1711,1712, and 1713. In 1714 he attended three meetings. One in 1715. None in 1716. In 1717 he ran in to trouble for refusing to pay a tax at Chilmark. He also helped the church draw up an account for a late act by Walter Newbury. His first recorded action for the Quakers in close to ten years. He then attended another meeting. He was absent from all meetings in 1718. But appeared again in 1719 to announce his daughters upcoming wedding. And then attended two more 1719 meetings. He went to one meeting in 1720. Two in 1721. One in 1724. and one in 1725, which was his last recorder appearance.

At a man's meeting in the town of Dartmouth the sixth day of the eleventh month, 1698, at the house of John Lapham, we, underwriters, Peleg Slocum, Jacob Mott, Abraham Tucker and John Tucker, undertake to build a meeting house for the people of God in scorn called Quakers, (35 foot long, 30 foot wide and 14 foot stud) to worship and serve the true and living God in according as they are persuaded in conscience they out to do, and for no other use, intent or purpose. We subscribe our names with our own hands, and for the use of the said society of people toward the building of said house of our free will contribute as followeth.

— Minutes of Dartmouth, Massachusetts Monthly Meeting of Friends,

Slocum was one of the first approved Ministers of the society. Additionally, he was known to travel in his sloop to the island of Nantucket with the intent of converting locals to his faith. In 1698, along with several other Dartmouth Quakers, Slocum pledged money to help build a meeting house. His was the largest individual donation. £15. He also purchased a lot on which to build the meeting house for one pound, sixteen shillings. The lot he purchased was six acres large and would go on to not just house the meeting house. But also a cemetery. In 1699, the meeting house was built. The first in Old Dartmouth, where the Apponegansett Meeting House is now located. He would also routinely meet with Quakers in high regard. Including Thomas Story, and John Richardson.

=== Holdings ===
Slocum's main holdings were in the Russells Mills Village Historic District. He settled in Slocum's Neck, when he died his homestead contained over one thousand acres. His home on the land was called 'The Mansion,' and was located near the home of Paul Barker and a Native American burial ground near Horseneck Road. In 1751 Slocum's land was divided some 20 years after his death. His son, Holder, received a large portion. His land included an Indian Meeting House which was thought to have been built by Slocum and the Quakers for Old Dartmouths Native American population. Slocum also owned a watering stop on Horseneck Road.

== Sources ==
- Glennon, Beverly (October 2001). Dartmouth: The Early History of a Massachusetts Coastal Town. New Bedford, MA: American Printing. p. 49. ISBN 978-0971459106.
