= Old Dartmouth =

Region of colonial Massachusetts

- Settlement
- Purchase deed from November 29, 1652, for Old Dartmouth.
- First colonized: 1602
- Purchased and Settled Officially: 1652
- Incorporated: 1664

Area
  - Total: 470 km^{2} (180 sq mi)

Old Dartmouth was the first area of Southeastern Massachusetts settled by Europeans. It was purchased on behalf of the Plymouth Colony in 1652 from the indigenous Wampanoag people. The lands included all of modern-day Dartmouth, New Bedford, Westport, Fairhaven, and Acushnet in Massachusetts, as well as parts of modern Tiverton and Little Compton In Rhode Island, an area of around 145,000 individuals in the modern area.

== History ==
=== Pre-colonization ===
Before colonization, the lands that accounted for Old Dartmouth had been inhabited by the Wampanoag Native Americans, who are part of the Algonquian language family. The Wampanoag had settlements throughout all of southeastern Massachusetts and Rhode Island, including the islands of Martha's Vineyard and Nantucket. It is believed that their population would have been around 12,000 at the time. The Wampanoag had inhabited the area for up to a thousand years before European colonization, and their ancestors had been there far longer. However, In John Winthrop's (1587–1649) journal, he wrote the name of Dartmouth's indigenous tribes as being the Nukkehkammes.

=== First settled by Europeans ===
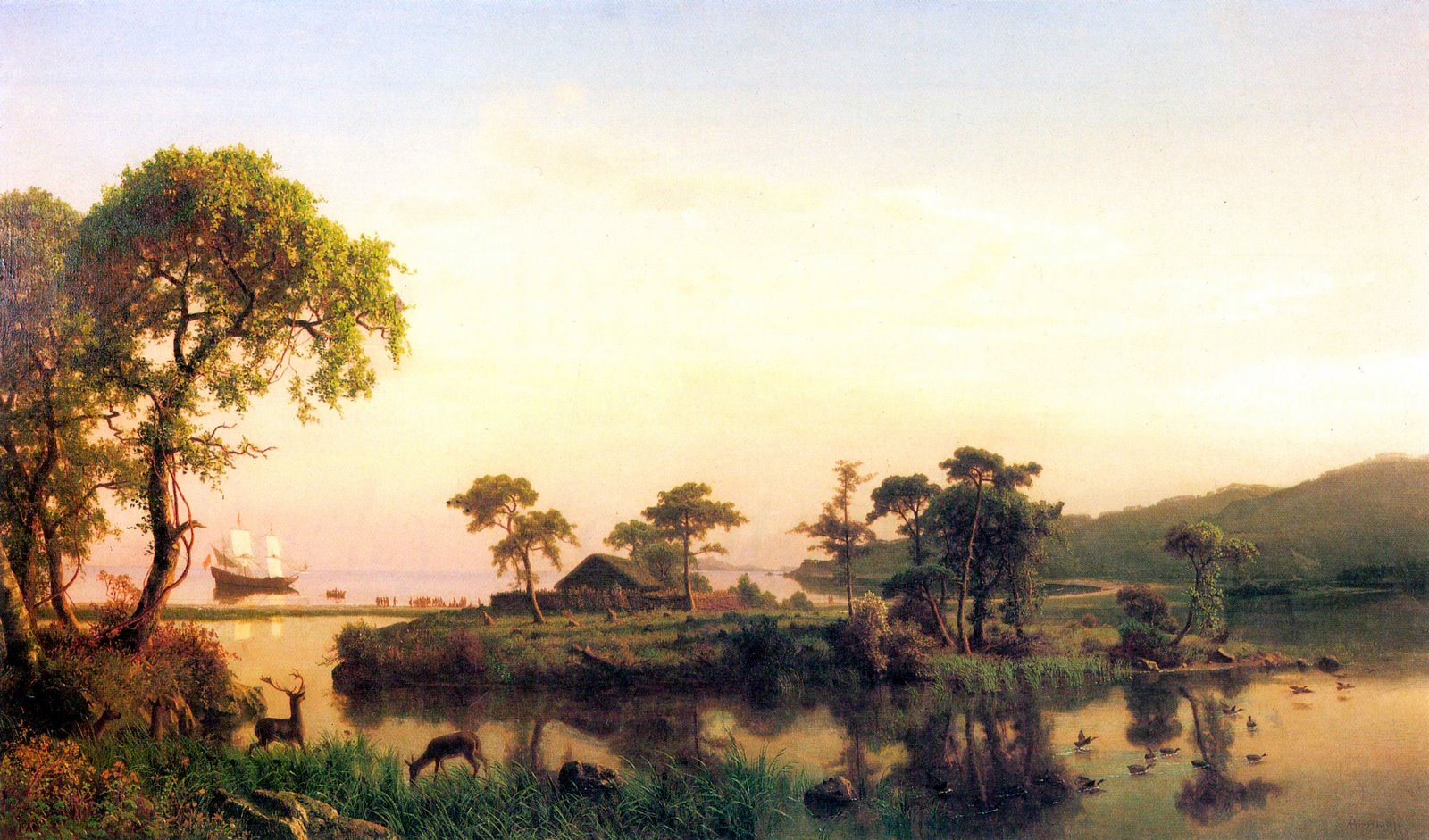
Gosnold at Cuttyhunk, 1602 by Albert Bierstadt (Oil on canvas. 1858. New Bedford Whaling Museum.)

The first European settlement in the Old Dartmouth area was at present-day Cuttyhunk Island by the explorer Bartholomew Gosnold in 1602. He arrived in a ship called The Concord which had set off from Falmouth and skirted past the Azores sometime earlier. Arriving at Cuttyhunk, Gosnold found evidence of indigenous inhabitants and noted an abundance of natural resources. He decided that due to the island's ample defense capabilities and fertile land it would be a perfect place to begin a new colony. After initiating the settlement on Cuttyhunk. Gosnold led an expedition to the mainland. He had several encounters with the natives. Relations at first were good. But as time progressed hostilities became more and more evident. Tension occurred throughout the remaining settlers and they soon abandoned the settlement.

=== Purchase and official settlement ===
In 1652, English colonists purchased Old Dartmouth. A region of 115,000 acres (470 km^{2}) changed hands in a treaty between the Wampanoag—represented by Chief Ousamequin (Massasoit) and his son Wamsutta—and high-ranking "Purchasers" and "Old Comers" from Plymouth Colony: John Winslow, William Bradford, Myles Standish, Thomas Southworth, Henry Howland, and John Cooke. The territory was purchased for "30 yards of cloth, eight moose skins, fifteen axes, fifteen hoes, fifteen pair of breeches, eight blankets, two kettles, one cloak, £2 in wampum, eight pair stockings, eight pair shoes, one iron pot and 10 shillings in another commoditie" [sic]. The area of the new settlement was described as being three miles east of the Acushnet River; running west to a flat rock on the west side of the Acoaxet River, and extending inland eight miles. The settlement was then split between 36 proprietors with each gaining at least 800 acres of land. The earliest settlements were all positioned in strategic locations from fear of the natives.

While the Europeans considered themselves full owners of the land through the transaction, the Wampanoag have disputed this claim because the concept of exclusive land ownership—in contrast with hunting, fishing, and farming rights—was a foreign concept to them. According to the European interpretation of the deed, within one year, all Natives previously living in the area had to leave. This led to a lengthy dispute over the boundary lines of the settlement, about which the deed was unclear. The younger son of Massasoit, Metacomet, began to question the boundary lines of the purchase. Metacomet stated that he had not been consulted about the sale, and he had not given his written permission. The situation culminated with new boundaries drawn up by referees. Chief Massasoit gave his final permission to the changes in 1665. Old Dartmouth was ultimately settled by English immigrants around November 1652 and was officially incorporated in 1664.

Members of the Quaker faith, officially known as the Religious Society of Friends, were among the earliest European settlers of the Old Dartmouth Area. They had faced persecution in the Puritan communities of Plymouth Colony and Massachusetts Bay Colony; the latter banned the Quakers in 1656–1657. When the Province of Massachusetts Bay annexed the Plymouth Colony in 1691, Quakers already represented a majority of the population of Old Dartmouth. In 1699, with the support of Peleg Slocum, the Quakers built their first meeting house in Old Dartmouth, where the Apponegansett Meeting House is now located. Before the construction of the meeting house, Quaker meetings had been held at the home of Peleg Slocum, one of the first approved ministers of the society.

At first, the Old Dartmouth territory lacked major population centers and instead consisted of isolated farms and small, decentralized villages. One reason for this was that the inhabitants feared the Plymouth court to appoint them a minister if they grew too large in size.

=== King Philip's War ===
The increasing European population and their demand for land led the colonists' relationship with the indigenous inhabitants of New England to deteriorate rapidly. European disregard for the terms of the Old Dartmouth Purchase eventually led to King Philip's War in 1675. At about this time Old Dartmouth consisted of around 30 homes. In this conflict, Wampanoag tribesmen, allied with the Narragansett and the Nipmuc, raided Old Dartmouth and other European settlements in the area. Europeans in Old Dartmouth garrisoned in sturdier homes—John Russell's home at Russells Mills, John Cooke's home in Fairhaven, and a third garrison on Palmer Island. The campaigns were led by the then Wampanoag Chief Metacomet, who had previously disputed the European claim to Old Dartmouth.

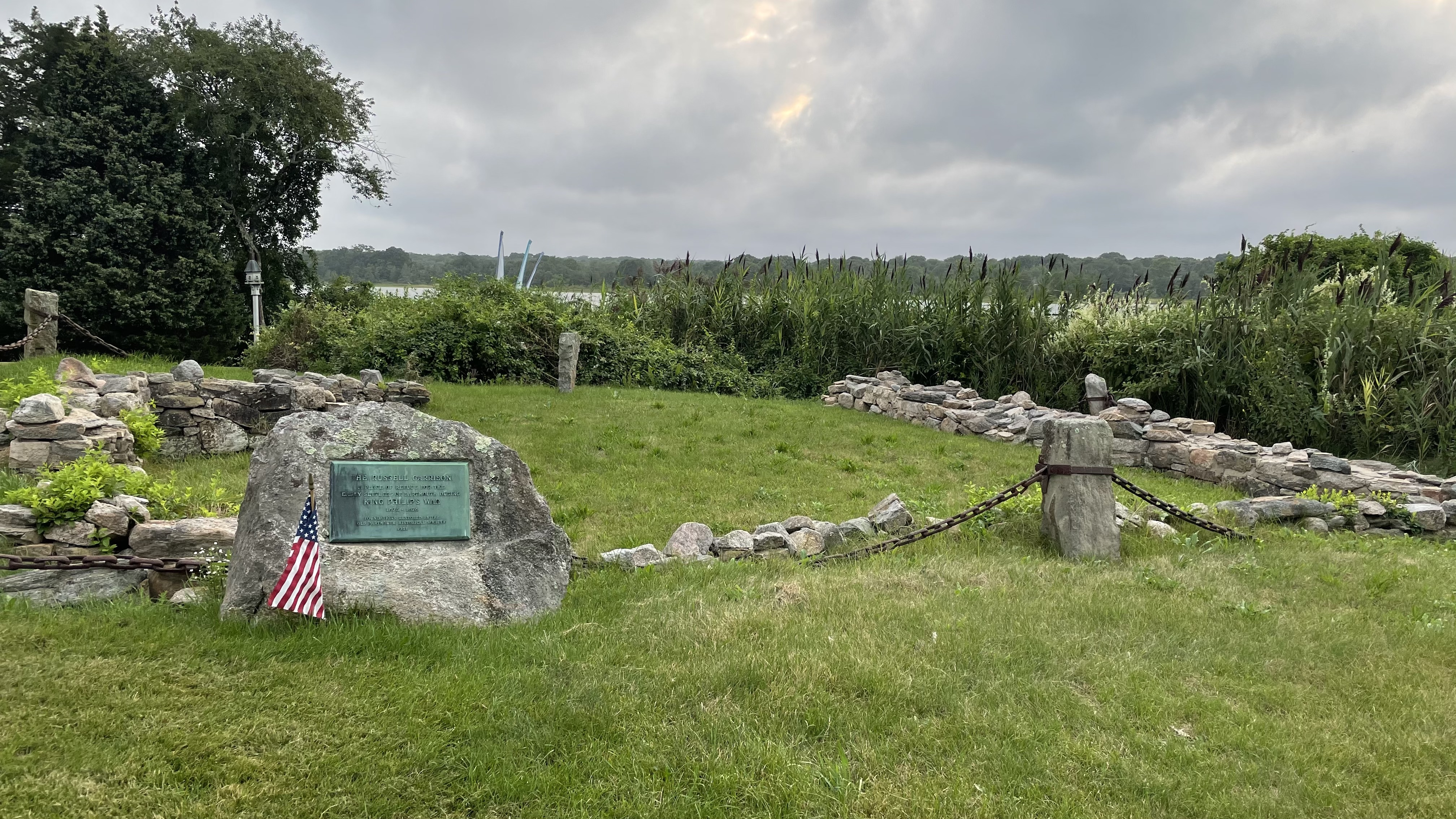
English colonists residing in Old Dartmouth garrisoned at Russell Garrison June 1675 fearing an attack from the Pokanoket in King Philip's War.

The war came to Old Dartmouth fairly early, when natives attacked the settlements of Old Dartmouth, Middleboro, and Taunton. They burned houses and killed inhabitants of the settlement. Few official records of the attack remain in place, but it is believed that following the attack Plymouth forces gathered in the Russell Garrison. In the same garrison several natives surrendered to Captain Samuel Eels, but were subsequently betrayed and brought to Plymouth, going against the settlers' promises. In all, it is believed that all thirty of Old Dartmouth's homes at the time were destroyed by the attacks. A known casualty of the war was Anthony Slocum, who had moved from Taunton to Old Dartmouth in 1662. He established his home on the west bank of the Paskamansett and was killed by Natives during the fighting. Additionally, during the war Old Dartmouth housed a garrison, built by John Russell, to fend off the attackers. Additionally, settlers Jacob Mitchell, his wife, and John Pope were all killed in the attacks. Jacob Mitchell's estates were inherited by his relatives Experience and Edward Mitchell.

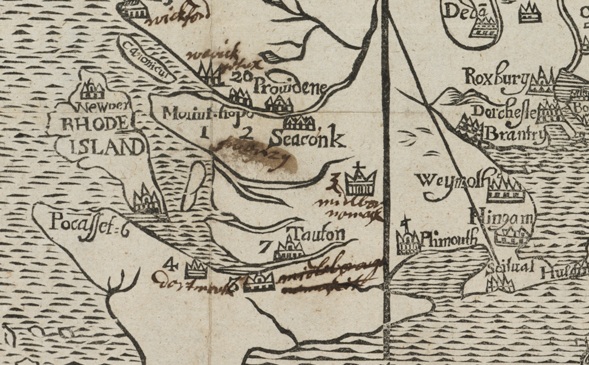
'Dartmouth' inscribed in relation to nearby settlements Pocasset, Newport, Seekonk, Taunton, and Plymouth on a copy of John Foster's 1677 A Map of New England in the collection of the Norman B. Leventhal Map Center of the Boston Public Library.

On July 20, 1676, Old Dartmouth once again lent its hand to the war effort. When Captain Benjamin Church was ordered to safely bring a train of carts to Major Bradford in Taunton. Upon delivering the train Church was notified that the important native captain Tishpaquine was in the area, and he led an attack against him.

=== Loss of territory ===
In 1746 the towns of Tiverton, and Little Compton broke away from Old Dartmouth. Later, in 1787, Old Dartmouth lost additional territory with the departure of Westport and New Bedford, the latter of which would continuously annex Old Dartmouth's territory in the coming years.

== Legacy ==
The Old Dartmouth Historical Society was established in the early 1900's to preserve the history of the Old Dartmouth area, the society evolved into the New Bedford Whaling Museum and turned its focus to the whaling aspect of the area.

== Sources ==
- Archer, Gabriel (1843). "The Relation of Captain Gosnold's Voyage to the North part of Virginia, begun the sixth-and twentieth of March, Anno 42 Elizabethae Reginae, 1602, and delivered by Gabriel Archer, a gentleman in the said voyage". Collections of the Massachusetts Historical Society. 3. 8: 72–81. The book is also contained in Purchas 1625, pp. IV:1647–51.
- Levermore, Charles Herbert, ed. (1912). Forerunners and Competitors of the Pilgrims and Puritans: or, Narratives of Voyages Made by Persons Other than the Pilgrims and Puritans of the Bay Colony to the Shores of New England during the First Quarter of the Seventeenth Century, 1601–1625, with Especial Reference to the Labors of Captain John Smith in Behalf of the Settlement of New England. Brooklyn, New York: The Society. LCCN a17000511.
- Purchas, Samuel, ed. (1625). Hakluytus posthumus, or, Purchas his Pilgrimes. Contayning a history of the world, in sea voyages, & lande-travells, by Englishmen and others …. London: Imprinted for H. Fetherston. The original imprint was "In fower parts, each containing five bookes." All four volumes are hosted online by the Library of Congress. The 1905–07 facsimile reproduction (Glasgow: J. MacLehose and sons), in 20 volumes (one for each of the "bookes") is hosted online by HathiTrust.
