= Apponegansett Meeting House =

Historic church in Massachusetts, United States

- U.S. National Register of Historic Places
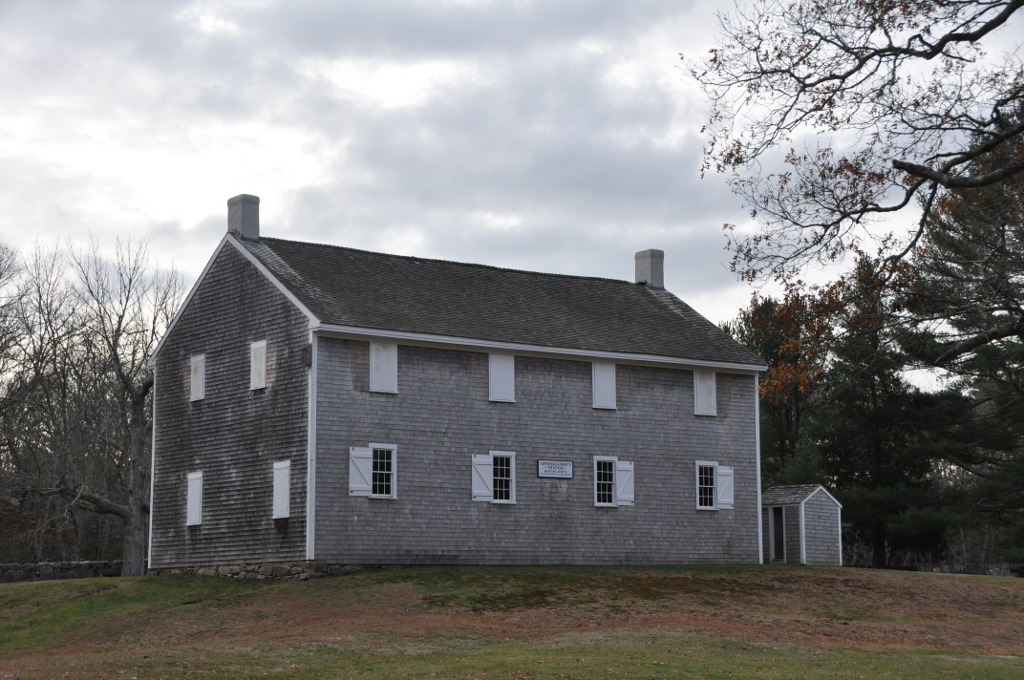

- Location within Massachusetts Location within the United States
- Location: Dartmouth, Massachusetts
- Coordinates: 41°35′2″N 70°59′43″W
- Area: 14 acres (5.7 ha)
- Built: 1791
- Architectural style: Georgian
- NRHP reference No.: 91000241
- Added to NRHP: March 14, 1991

The Apponegansett Meeting House or "Apponagansett Meeting House" is a historic Quaker (Friends) meeting house on Russells Mills Road east of Fresh River Valley Road in Dartmouth, Massachusetts. Built in 1791, it is the oldest Quaker meeting house in southeastern Massachusetts, and one of its best preserved. The property it stands on, which includes a cemetery, has been used by its Quaker congregation since at least 1699. It was added to the National Register of Historic Places in 1991.

== Description and history ==
The Apponegansett Meeting House is set on the south side of Russells Mills Road, just east of Fresh River Valley Road. It is a two-story wood frame structure, with a gable roof, wooden shingle siding, and a rubblestone foundation. It is set atop a low rise on about 14 acres (5.7 ha) of land, which include a cemetery (located south and west of the building), a 19th-century privy house, and the archaeological remnants of the first meeting house and other outbuildings.

In 1787 the Quakers of Old Dartmouth decided to build the Apponagansett Meeting house on the land previously housing their old meeting house, which they tore down in 1790 to make room for the new one. The cost of the meeting house was £300 and was collected by a committee established by the Friends, at one of their monthly meetings. In the 1790s, approximately one thousand Quakers worshipped at the meeting house. By 1875 that number would dwindle to 100, this was a direct result of the large amounts of 'disownments made by the Quaker congregation. They would remove any person who they believed was committing a transgression, such as premarital sex, dancing, drinking alcohol, listening to music, or wearing brightly colored clothing. Meetings for worship at the meeting housed ceased in the mid 1920s, with Dartmouth Monthly Meetings taking place at the Smiths Neck Meeting House instead. In 1930 all activity stopped, but in 1931 a large meeting took place. Which would then continue annually.

The meeting house was built in 1791, on land that has been used by local Quakers since the 17th century. Quakers were among the earliest European settlers of the Old Dartmouth area, which included most of what is now Westport, Acushnet, New Bedford, and Fairhaven. Their first meeting house was built on this property (exact location undetermined) in 1699, and the cemetery is the burial ground for many of Dartmouth's early settlers. The first meeting house was repeatedly enlarged, until it was decided to build the present structure in 1791. Despite the decline in local Quaker congregations, the building continues to be maintained by the community, and is used for services in the summer.

Several scenes of Down to the Sea in Ships, a 1922 film, were filmed there.

In 1990, a committee was formed to create a week long celebration of the meeting house.

== See also ==
- National Register of Historic Places listings in Bristol County, Massachusetts
