= Southworth Library (Dartmouth, Massachusetts) =

Public library in Padanaram, Massachusetts

Coordinates: 41°35′20″N 70°56′46″W

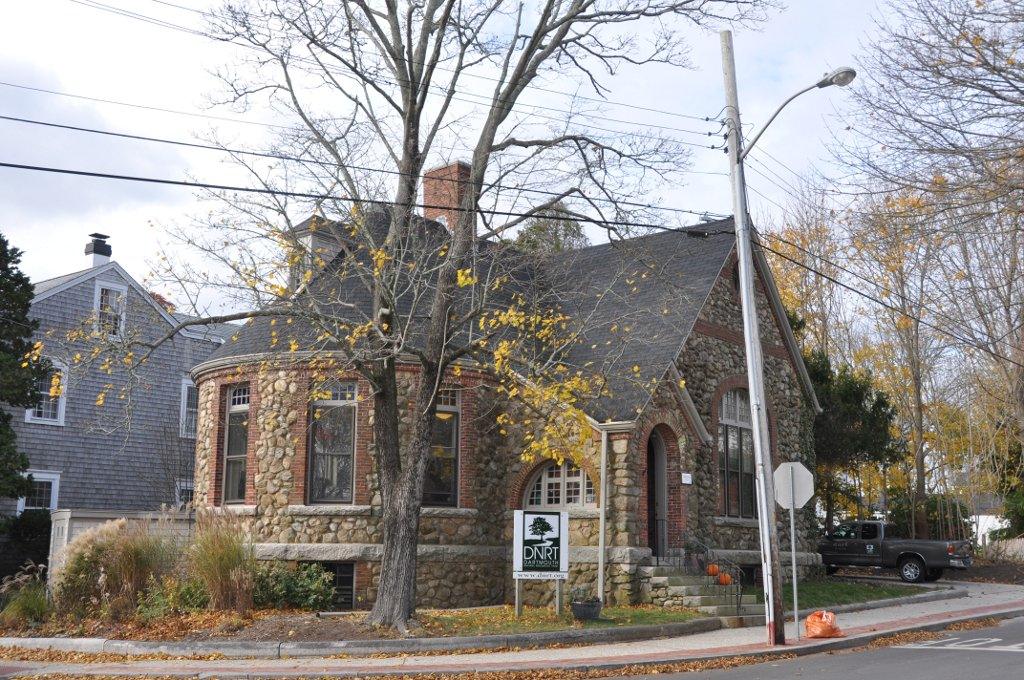

General information
- Location: 404 Elm Street, Dartmouth, Massachusetts, United States of America
- Completed: February 1, 1890
- Cost: $4,785

Technical details
- Floor count: 2

Design and construction
- Architect: R. H. Slack
- Type: Public library

The Southworth Library was a library located in the village of Padanaram, a coastal village located in Dartmouth, Massachusetts, at 404 Elm Street. The library was opened in 1890, and the building is currently known as the Dartmouth Cultural Center. The actual library has moved to another location within the town of Dartmouth. It is one of two public libraries in the town, the other being the North Dartmouth Library.

== History ==
=== Origin ===
In 1878, the pastor of the Congregational church of South Dartmouth - Reverend Salter F Calhoun - formed a group with the aim of creating a public library. The initial library was only available to Padanaram residents, and only contained eight books. The original collection was located at the home of Edward Manchester, but as it progressed in size it was moved to Potter's Store at the corner of Elm and Bridge Streets in Dartmouth. The last location before it was moved to its final position - at 404 Elm Street - was a small building across the street from Potter's Store. The rent at the penultimate building - $24 - was paid for by Dr. Andrew B. Cushman, in return for use of the library as an office.

=== Construction ===
In March 1888, the land that the library would be built upon was sold by Captain George O. Baker to the library association for 200 United States dollars. Funds for the library were procured from John Haywood Southworth, who in addition to donating funds needed for creating the building, also donated 2,500 books - all in the memory of his father. The building was designed by architect R. H. Slack, who fashioned the building with a reference room in the shape of a half circle, an additional room with the fiction collection, and a downstairs section for children's literature. The building was two stories, 1,999 square feet, and cost US$4,785 to build. Southworth library was completed and dedicated on February 1, 1890, by Reverend Martin S. Howard.

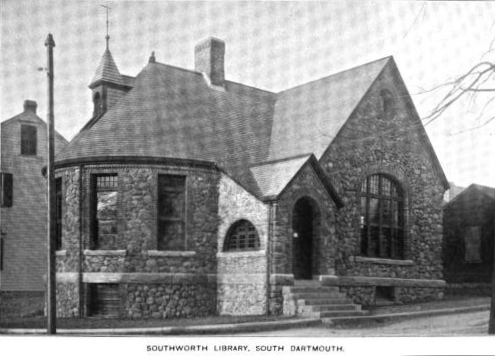
The library in 1899

=== Public usage ===
At the time the library first opened, a library card cost 50 cents, with late fees being 1 cent per day.

The books in circulation in 1910 was still 2,500.

In 1920, the library added 132 books, and had 542 people borrow books. Theodosia Chase, the librarian, requested a toilet be added to the library. The library expended $24.06

The library was supplied with running water and modern plumbing in 1921.

In 1927, the library was acquired by the town of Dartmouth. In the same year the libraries collection consisted of 17,921 books.

During the Great Depression, the library worked as an assembly place for unemployed boys.

In 1930, the Libraries Circulation had increased to 24,715 books. The hosted a book week, a Story Telling hour for children, talks about the history of the library, and a book club. It was at this point the library became a meeting place for unemployed boys in Dartmouth.

By 1940, the library had a total circulation of 29,115. 605 of which they added in 1940. They added a 'bookmobile' in 1940, which they used to service areas isolated from the central library.

In 1950, the Library changed their stack arrangement to make more space for more books. The circulation of books had declined since 1940, to 26,455 books. In 1950, they also held a flower arrangement show, and several activities in the children's rooms.

In 1958, the library no longer had enough room to fit their collection of books, and by 1967, the town agreed to spend $515,000 on building a new library.

== As the Dartmouth Cultural Center ==
The Dartmouth Cultural Center - which is housed at the library - hosts various events in the local community, mostly regarding art and youth activities. Dartmouth Cultural Center maintains its mission through educational activities, presenting the works of local artists and art groups, and partnering and collaborating with others committed to the arts in their community; the DCC is a nonprofit cultural art and educational organization providing community events to the South Coast of MA. They also offered online services during the COVID-19 pandemic.

The journey of the Dartmouth Cultural Center began as a community-based effort to save and preserve the Old Southworth Library, for future generations.

The center was established to prevent the Southworth Library building from falling into disrepair following the end of its service as a functional library. It was designed to showcase local artists and to highlight local history.
