= Russell Garrison =

- U.S. National Register of Historic Places
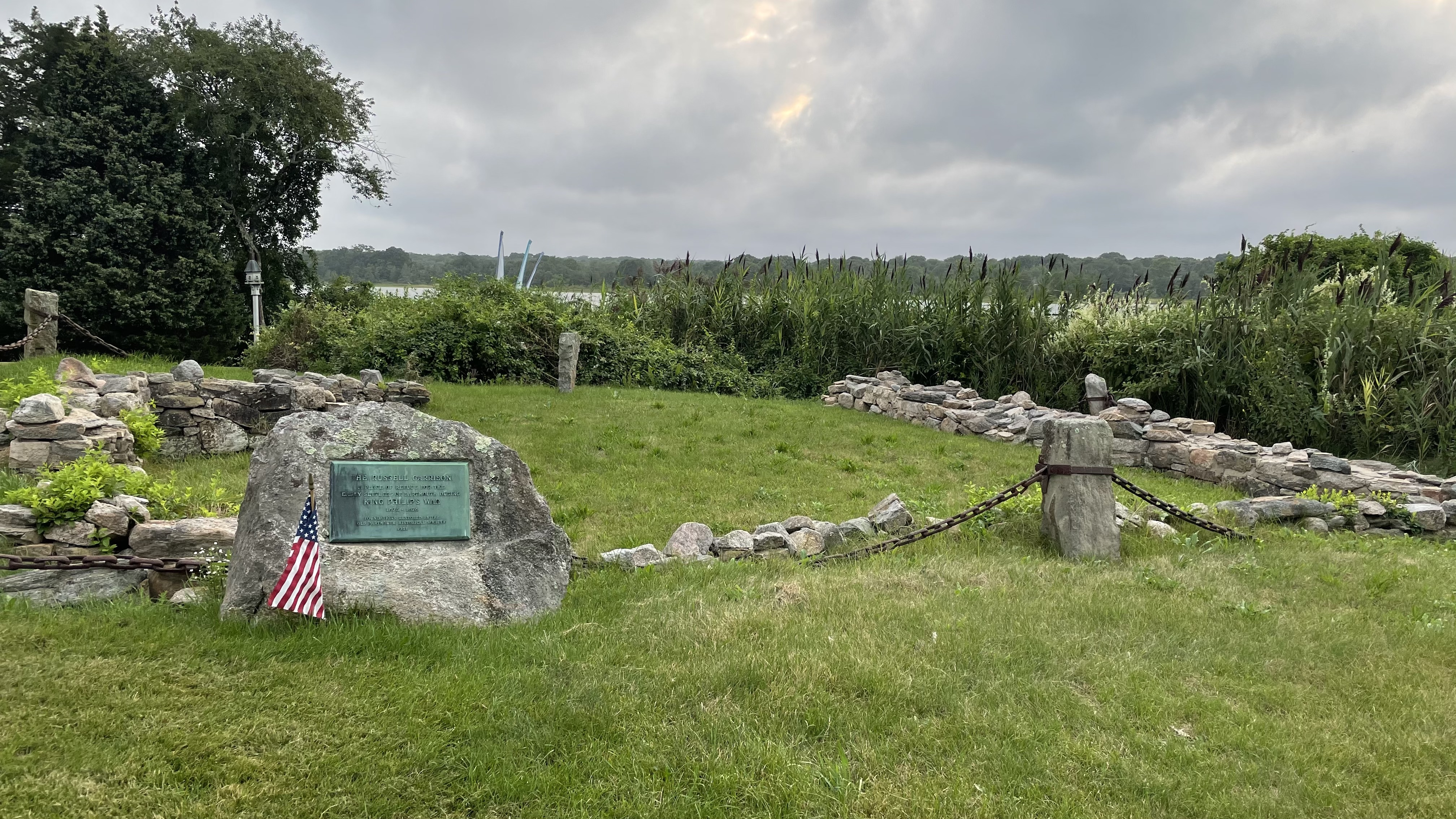

- Location within Massachusetts Location within the United States
- Location: Fort Street, Dartmouth, Massachusetts
- Coordinates: 41°35′52″N 70°57′25″W
- Area: less than one acre
- Built: 1675
- NRHP reference No.: 100002215
- Added to NRHP: August 6, 2018

The Russell Garrison was a fortified area of Dartmouth, Massachusetts in the 17th century. Now a small town-owned public park located on Fort Street in its Apponagansett neighborhood, the garrison site includes the reconstructed foundational remnants of the homestead of early settler John Russell, progenitor of the locally prominent Russell family. The house was originally surrounded by a wooden stockade, and was the site of attacks during King Philip's War in the 1670s. It is one of the town's few 17th-century home sites whose location is known, having undergone excavation in 1951. The site was listed on the National Register of Historic Places in 2018.

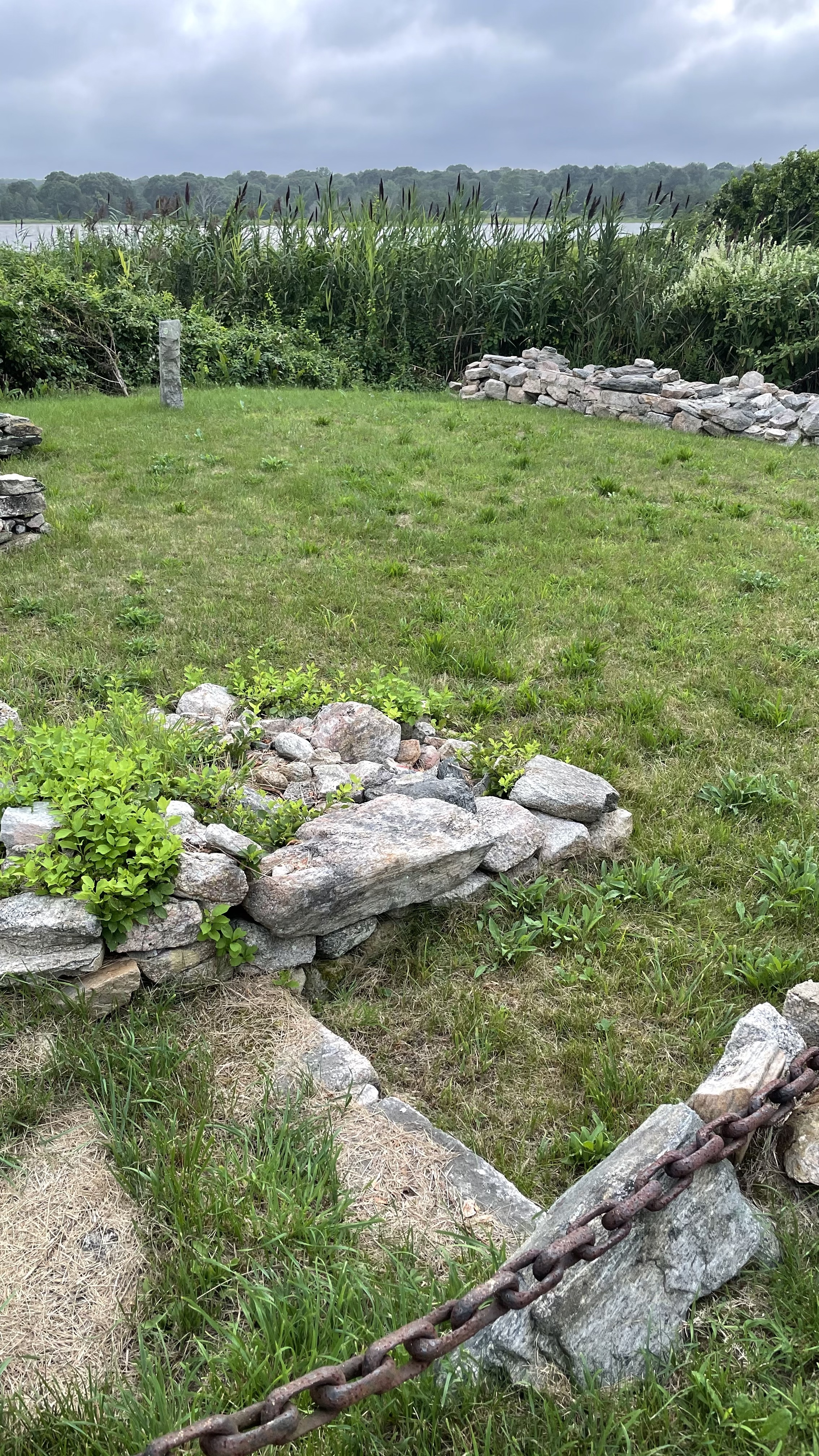

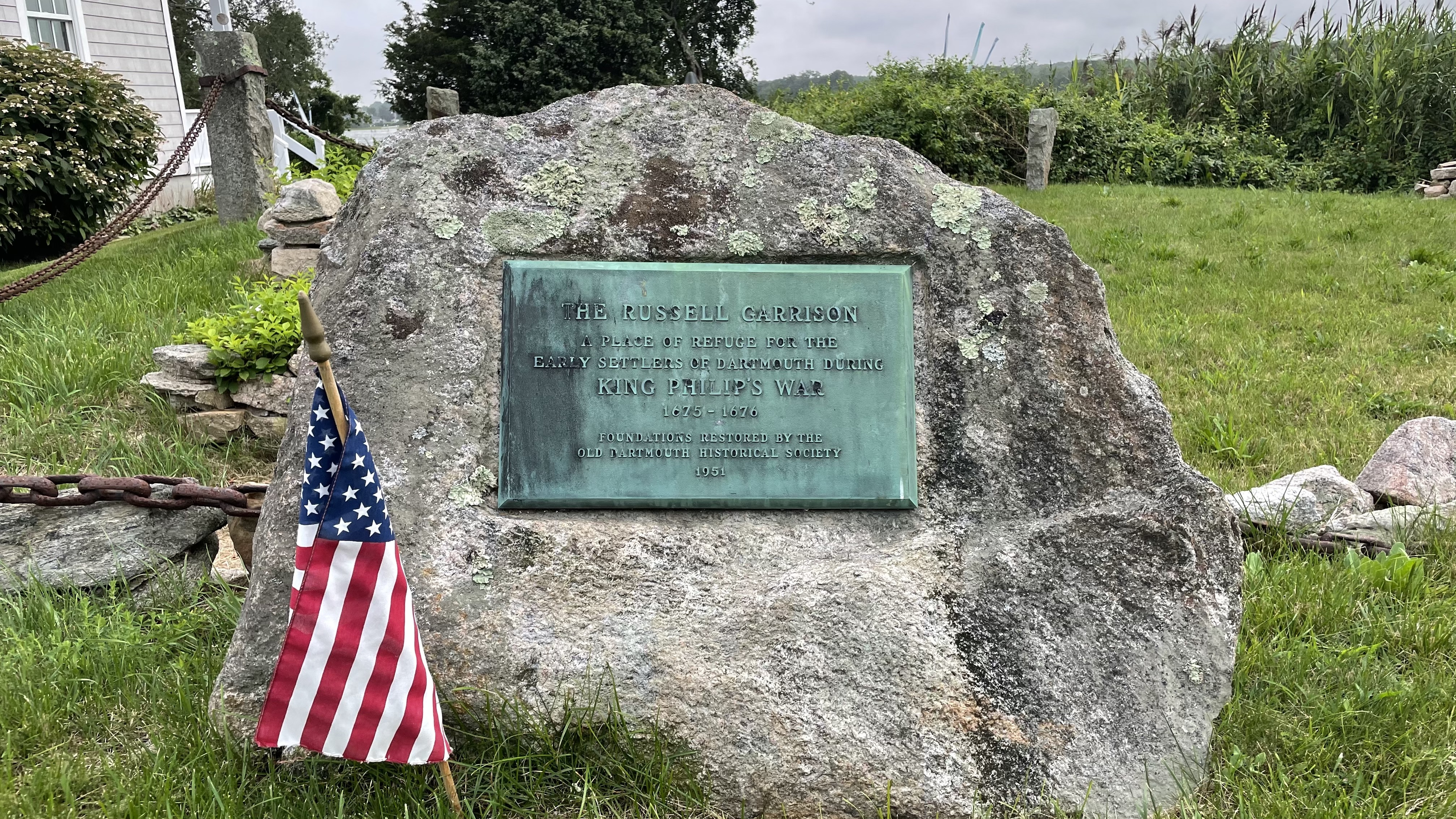

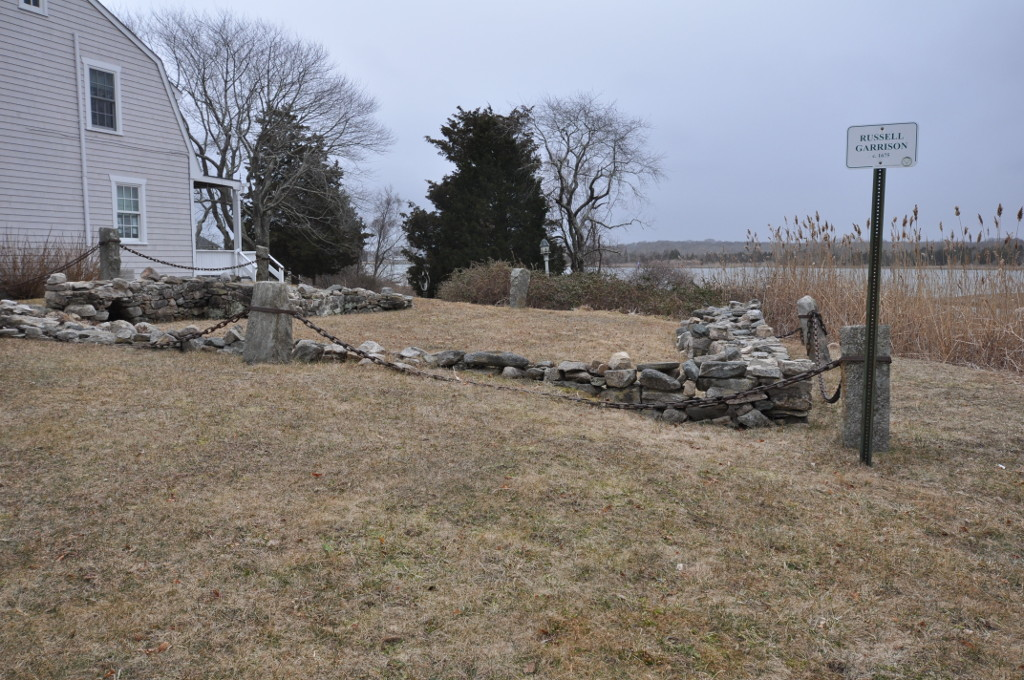

== See also ==
- National Register of Historic Places listings in Bristol County, Massachusetts
