= Slocum =

Slocum may refer to:

== People ==
- Bill Slocum (1947–2023), American politician from Pennsylvania
- Blanche Slocum (1885–1960), American singer
- Brian Slocum (born 1981)
- Brian Slocum (law professor), American law professor
- Charles W. Slocum (1835–1912), American pioneer businessman
- Craig Slocum (1934–1978), American actor
- Destiny Slocum (born 1997), American basketball player
- Frances Slocum (1773–1847), adopted member of the Miami tribe
- Frances Walker-Slocum (1924–2018), American educator
- Frederick Slocum (1873–1944), American astronomer
- Harvey Slocum (1887–1961), American construction superintendent
- Heath Slocum (born 1974), American professional golfer
- Henry Slocum (tennis) (1862–1940), professional athlete and Hall of Fame member
- Henry Warner Slocum (1827–1894), American Union general during the Civil War
- Herbert Jermain Slocum (1855–1928), American military officer
- Jamie Slocum (died 2023), American singer-songwriter
- Jane Slocum (1842–1924), American educator
- Jerry Slocum (born 1931), American historian and author
- Jerry Slocum (basketball) (born 1952), American college basketball coach
- John Slocum (disambiguation), several people
  - John Slocum (1838–1897), American prophet of the Indian Shaker Church
  - John J. Slocum (1914–1997), diplomat and bibliophile
  - John W. Slocum (1867–1938), American politician and judge from New Jersey
- Joseph J. Slocum (1833–1924), American businessman
- Joshua Slocum (1844–1909), Canadian-American explorer
- Kay Slocum, American musician and historian
- Linda Slocum (born 1950), American politician from Minnesota
- Lois Tripp Slocum (1899–1951), American astronomer
- Mark Slocum, American Air Force general
- Matt Slocum (disambiguation), several people
  - Matt Slocum (born 1972), American guitarist and composer for the band Sixpence None the Richer
  - Matt Slocum (drummer) (born 1981), American jazz drummer and composer
  - Matt Slocum (keyboardist) (born 1974), southern jam band pianist
- Margaret Olivia Slocum or Margaret Olivia Slocum Sage (1828–1918), American philanthropist and second wife of industrialist Russell Sage
- Mick Slocum (born 1965), Irish Gaelic football coach
- Peleg Slocum (1654–1732/33), American Quaker
- Ptolemy Slocum (born 1975), American actor
- R. C. Slocum (born 1944), American professional football player and coach
- Ray Slocum (1936–2013), Australian Rules footballer
- Robert Slocum, American botanist and biologist
- Ron Slocum (1945–1988), American professional basketball player
- Samuel Slocum (1792–1861), American inventor
- Shawn Slocum (born 1965), American football coach
- William Slocum (disambiguation), several people
  - William F. Slocum (1851–1934)
  - William J. Slocum (1883–1943), American sportswriter

== Places ==
=== Communities ===
- Slocum, Ohio, an unincorporated community in Scioto County
- Slocum, Rhode Island, a small village in the town of North Kingstown
- Slocum, Texas, an unincorporated community in Anderson County
- Slocum Township, Pennsylvania, a township

=== Other ===
- Fort Slocum, in the city of New Rochelle, New York
- Frances Slocum State Park, a park in Luzerne County, Pennsylvania
- Slocum (crater) on the Moon, named after Frederick Slocum
- Slocums River, a tidal river in southeastern Massachusetts
- Slocum's River Reserve, an open space preserve in Dartmouth, Massachusetts

== Other ==
- PS General Slocum, a steamship destroyed by fire in the East River of New York City in 1904
- Slocum Westerns, a series of "adult-oriented" Western novels by various authors (writing as Jake Logan)
- Slocum and Hannah Howland House, a historic building in Cayuga County, New York
- Slocum House (Vancouver, Washington), a historic building
- Slocum massacre, a racial conflict that took place in Slocum, Texas, in 1910
- Slocum stone, a synthetically grown opal
- Slocum (K-9), fictional character in the television series K-9

== See also ==
- Slocombe (disambiguation)
- Slocumb (disambiguation)
