= John Slocum (disambiguation) =

John Slocum may refer to:

- Colonel John S. Slocum (1824–1861), namesake of Fort Slocum (Washington, D.C.)
- John Slocum (1838–1897), the founder of the Indian Shaker Church
- John W. Slocum (1867–1938), American lawyer and politician
- John J. Slocum (1914–1997), diplomat and bibliographer
- John L. Slocum (1920–1998), inventor of the Slocum stone
