= Slocomb =

Slocomb could refer to:

- Slocomb, Alabama, U.S., a city
- Slocomb (name), a surname and given name

== See also ==
- Slocombe
- Field & Slocomb, an American firm from 1902 to 1904
- Hartford and Slocomb Railroad, a railroad in Alabama, U.S.
