= Slocumb =

Slocumb is an English surname. Notable people with the surname include:

- Heathcliff Slocumb (born 1966), American baseball player
- Jesse Slocumb (1780–1820), U.S. representative
- William Slocumb (1810–1865), Canadian physician and politician

== See also ==
- Slocombe (disambiguation)
- Slocum (disambiguation)
