= Charles Hugh Smiley =

American astronomer and academic

- Born: September 6, 1903; Camden, Missouri
- Died: July 26, 1977 (aged 73); Providence, Rhode Island
- Siglum: Charles H. Smiley
- Education: University of California, Berkeley
- Scientific career
- Fields: Astronomy and mathematics
- Workplaces: Brown University
- Theses: Indeterminateness in Leuschner's method of differential correction of orbits. (1925); On the number of solutions in Leuschner's direct method of determining parabolic orbits. (1927)

Charles Hugh Smiley (September 6, 1903 – July 26, 1977) was an American astronomer and academic, and the author of a column on astronomy, "Planets and Stars" (Providence Journal, 1938–1957). He was considered "one of the world’s leading authorities on eclipses."

== Biography ==
He attended UCLA and UC Berkeley, where he earned a B.A. mathematics degree in 1924. He received an M.A. (1925) and a Ph.D. (1927) from Berkeley, both in mathematics. He taught mathematics at the University of Illinois Urbana-Champaign (1927-9) and worked at the Royal Greenwich Observatory as a Guggenheim Fellow (1929–30). He worked as a professor of mathematics at Brown University from 1930 onwards. He was Director of Ladd Observatory and served as chairman of the Department of Astronomy from 1938 until his retirement.

Between 1930 and 1972 Smiley led fourteen expeditions to study solar eclipses. He observed the solar eclipse of July 20, 1963 from a U.S. Air Force F-104D Starfighter supersonic aircraft that was "racing the moon's shadow" at 1,300 mph (2,100 km/h) extending the duration of totality. He also conducted several expeditions between 1947 and 1952 to study "atmospheric refraction at low angular altitudes." He also studied the Mayan calendar, and "was able to date the Mayan codices of Dresden, Paris, and Madrid from astronomical dates which they contained."

== Honors ==
When the minor planet 1570 Brunonia was discovered on October 9, 1948, by Sylvain Arend at the Royal Observatory of Belgium in Uccle, Belgium, Arend wrote to Smiley:

— This planet is named in honor of Brown University, Providence, Rhode Island. ... Its astronomical history dates back to the transit of Venus in 1769, observed by Prof. Benjamin West. Two local streets are named Planet and Transit. The naming of the planet is also a tribute to the international reputation of Dr. Smiley.

1613 Smiley, another minor planet discovered by Arend in 1950, is "Named in honor of Charles Smiley, interested mainly in orbit computations by Leuschner's method..."

== Published works ==
- Smiley, Charles Hugh (1928). "On the number of solutions in Leuschner's direct method of determining parabolic orbits". Lick Observatory Bulletin. 405: 10. Bibcode:1928LicOB..14...10S. doi:10.5479/ADS/bib/1928LicOB.14.10S.
- Smiley, Charles H. (1929). "Indeterminateness in Leuschner's method of differential correction of orbits". The Astronomical Journal. 39: 54. doi:10.1086/104886.
- Smiley, Charles H. (1930). "Note on the vectorial constants of orbits". The Astronomical Journal. 40: 31. Bibcode:1930AJ.....40...31S. doi:10.1086/104957.
- Smiley, Charles H. (1931). "The Accuracy of Wireless Time Signals". Science. 73 (1902): 640–641. doi:10.1126/science.73.1902.640.a. PMID 17814358.
- Smiley, Charles H. (January 1936). "The Schmidt camera". Popular Astronomy. 44 (1): 415–421. Bibcode:1936PA.....44..415S.
- Smiley, C. H. (1936). "Note on the design of Schmidt cameras". Publications of the American Astronomical Society. 8: 150. Bibcode:1936PAAS....8R.150S.
- Smiley, Charles H. (1938). "Flare in Schmidt Cameras". Journal of the Optical Society of America. 28 (4): 130. Bibcode:1939PAAS....9Q.134S. doi:10.1364/JOSA.28.000130.
- Smiley, Charles H. (April 1940). "The Schmidt camera". Popular Astronomy. 48 (4): 175–181. Bibcode:1940PA.....48..175S.
- Smiley, Charles H. (1942). "Lunar occultations observed at Ladd Observatory, 1932-1940". The Astronomical Journal. 50: 21. doi:10.1086/105699.
- Smiley, Charles H. (1947). "Atmospheric refraction at low altitudes". The Astronomical Journal. 52: 157. doi:10.1086/105979.
- Smiley, Charles H.; Quirk, Mary (April 1955). "Solar Eclipses of Long Duration of Totality". Journal of the Royal Astronomical Society of Canada. 49: 69. Bibcode:1955JRASC..49...69S.
- Smiley, Charles H. (1960). "A New Correlation of the Mayan and Christian Calendars". Nature. 188 (4746): 215–216. doi:10.1038/188215a0.
- Smiley, Charles H. (1962). "The Mayan Calendar". Leaflet of the Astronomical Society of the Pacific. 8 (392): 327. Bibcode:1962ASPL....8..327S.
- Smiley, Charles H. (1965). "Solar Eclipse Intervals in the Dresden Codex". Journal of the Royal Astronomical Society of Canada. 59: 127. Bibcode:1965JRASC..59..127S.
