= Hazel Scott =

American pianist and singer (1920–1981)

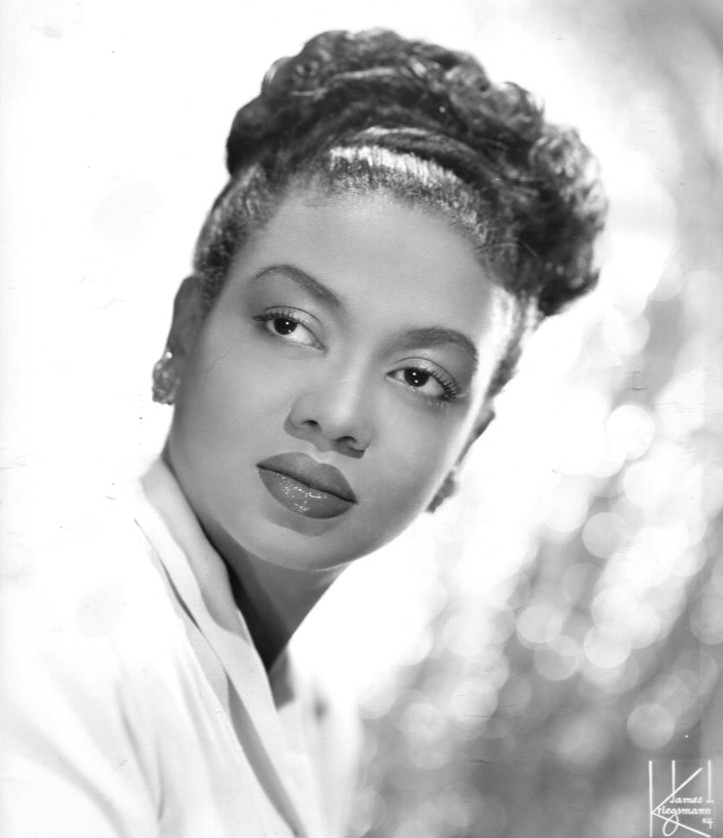
- Scott in 1947
- Born: Hazel Dorothy Scott; June 11, 1920; Port of Spain, Trinidad and Tobago
- Died: October 2, 1981 (aged 61); New York City, U.S.
- Occupations: Pianist, singer
- Known for: The first black American to host her own network TV series, The Hazel Scott Show
- Spouse: Adam Clayton Powell Jr. (m. 1945; div. 1960)
- Children: Adam Clayton Powell III

Hazel Dorothy Scott (June 11, 1920 – October 2, 1981) was an American jazz and classical pianist and singer. An outspoken critic of racial discrimination and segregation, she used her influence to improve the representation of Black Americans in film.

Born in Port of Spain, Trinidad, Scott moved to New York City with her mother at the age of four. Scott was a musical child prodigy, receiving scholarships to study at the Juilliard School when she was eight. In her teens, she performed at Café Society while still at school. She also performed on the radio.

She was active as a jazz singer throughout the 1930s and 1940s. In 1950, she became the first black American to host her own TV series, The Hazel Scott Show. Scott’s career in the United States faltered after she testified before the House Un-American Activities Committee in 1950 during the era of McCarthyism.

Scott subsequently moved to Paris, France, in 1957 and began performing in Europe. She did not return to the United States for ten years, until 1967.

== Early life ==
Hazel Dorothy Scott was born in Port of Spain, Trinidad and Tobago, on June 11, 1920. She was the only child of R. Thomas Scott, a West African scholar from Liverpool, England, and Alma Long Scott, a classically trained pianist and music teacher. In 1924, the family moved to the United States and settled in Harlem, New York City. Scott's parents had separated by this time, and she lived with her mother and grandmother.

By then, Scott could play anything she heard on the piano. With her mother's guidance and training, she mastered advanced piano techniques and was labeled a child prodigy. When Scott was eight years old, she began studying with Professor Oscar Wagner of the Juilliard School of Music. In 1933, her mother organized her own Alma Long Scott's All-Girl Jazz Band, where Scott played the piano and trumpet.

== Career ==
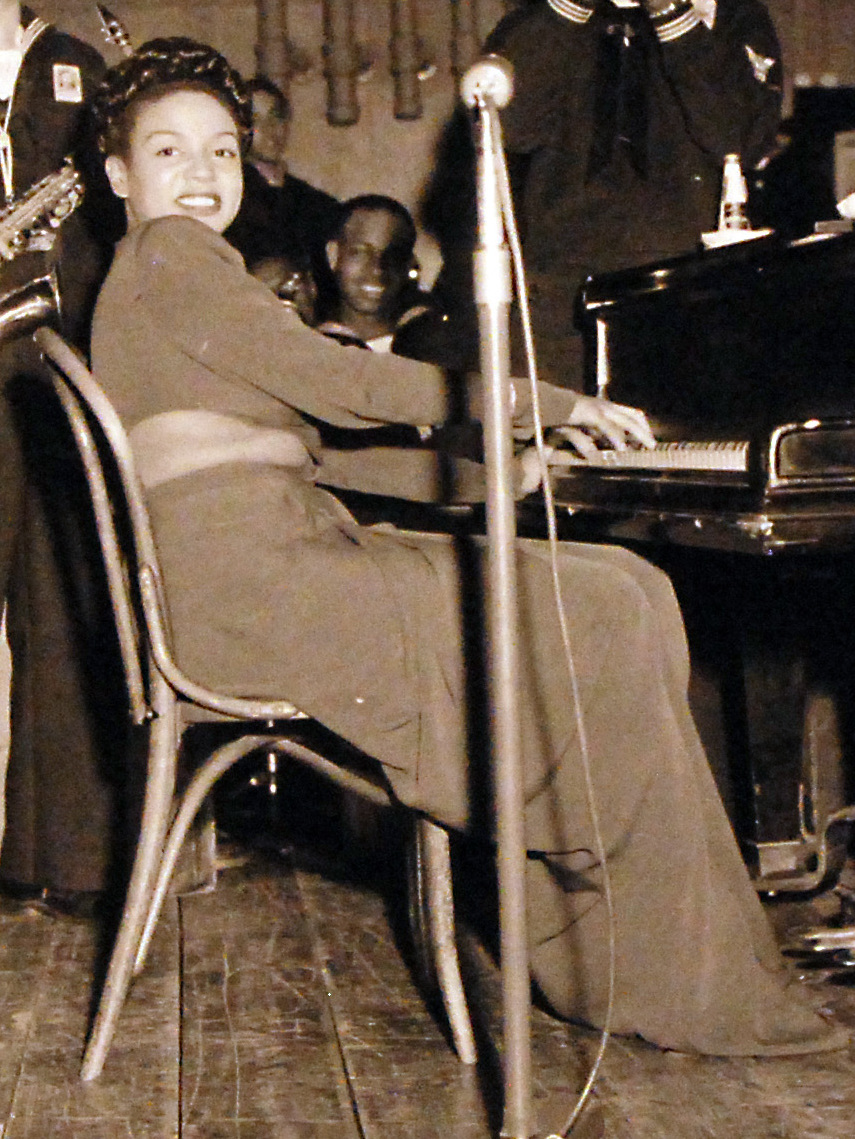
Scott on December 17, 1943, playing at Naval Station Great Lakes

By the age of 16, Hazel Scott regularly performed for radio programs for the Mutual Broadcasting System, gaining a reputation as the "hot classicist". In the mid-1930s, she also performed at the Roseland Dance Hall with the Count Basie Orchestra. Her early musical theatre appearances in New York included the Cotton Club Revue of 1938, Sing Out the News alongside Will Geer, June Allyson and Maude Simmons; and The Priorities of 1942.

Throughout the 1930s and 1940s, Scott performed jazz, blues, ballads, Broadway and boogie-woogie songs, and classical music in various nightclubs. Barney Josephson, the owner of the black and tan club Café Society, hired her and, from 1939 to 1943, she was a leading attraction at both the downtown and uptown branches of Café Society. Her performances created national prestige for the practice of "swinging the classics". By 1945, Scott was earning $75,000 ($1,341,266 today) a year.

Along with Lena Horne, Scott was one of the first black women to gain respectable roles in major Hollywood pictures. She refused to take roles in Hollywood playing a "singing maid", and she turned down the first four roles she was offered for this reason. When she began performing in Hollywood films, she insisted on having final cut privileges when it came to her appearance. She performed as herself in the films I Dood It (MGM, 1943), Broadway Rhythm (MGM, 1944) with Lena Horne, in the otherwise all-white cast of The Heat's On (Columbia, 1943), Something to Shout About (Columbia, 1943), and Rhapsody in Blue (Warner Bros, 1945). She appeared in five Hollywood films in all, always insisting on the credit line "Miss Hazel Scott as Herself", and wearing her own clothes and jewelry to protect her image. Her final break with Columbia Pictures' Harry Cohn involved "a costume which she felt stereotyped blacks". In the 1940s, in addition to her film appearances, she was featured in Café Society's From Bach to Boogie-Woogie concerts in 1941 and 1943 at Carnegie Hall.

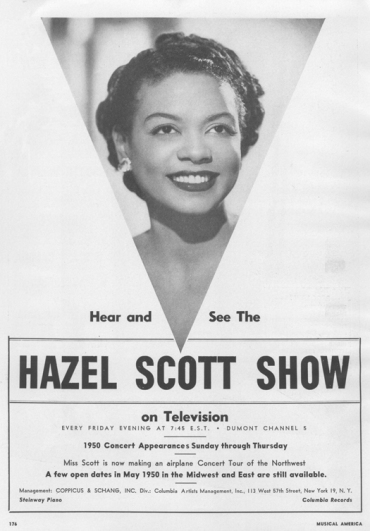
Flyer for The Hazel Scott Show, 1950

She was the first person of African descent to have her own television show in the U.S., The Hazel Scott Show, which premiered on the DuMont Television Network on July 3, 1950. Variety reported that "Hazel Scott has a neat little show in this modest package," its "most engaging element" being Scott herself. The show became so popular, it soon ran three times a week. On the show, Scott performed with the jazz musicians Charles Mingus and Max Roach who were among the members of her supporting band.

== Activism and blacklisting ==
=== Civil rights ===
Scott had long been committed to civil rights. Scott refused to perform in segregated venues when she was on tour. She was once escorted from the city of Austin, Texas by Texas Rangers because she refused to perform when she discovered that black and white patrons were seated separately. "Why would anyone come to hear me, a Negro," she told Time magazine, "and refuse to sit beside someone just like me?"

In 1949, Scott brought a suit against the owners of a Pasco, Washington restaurant when a waitress refused to serve Scott and her traveling companion, Mrs. Eunice Wolfe, because "they were Negroes". Scott's victory helped African Americans challenge racial discrimination in Spokane, as well as inspiring civil rights organizations "to pressure the Washington state legislature to enact the Public Accommodations Act" in 1953.

=== McCarthyism ===
With the advent of the Red Scare in the television industry, Scott's name appeared in Red Channels: A Report on Communist Influence in Radio and Television in June 1950. In an effort to clear her name, Scott voluntarily appeared before the House Un-American Activities Committee (HUAC) on September 22, 1950, and insisted on reading a prepared statement. She denied that she was "ever knowingly connected with the Communist Party or any of its front organizations." However, she stated that she had supported Communist Party member Benjamin J. Davis Jr.'s campaign for the New York City Council, arguing that Davis was supported by socialists, a group that "has hated Communists longer and more fiercely than any other." She also expressed her frustrations with the mass amount of false accusations of entertainers and offered the suggestion to use "democratic methods to immediately eliminate a good many irresponsible charges." Scott concluded her statement to the HUAC with a request that entertainers be not already "covered with the mud of slander and the filth of scandal" when proving their loyalty to the United States.

Her television variety program, The Hazel Scott Show, was cancelled a week after Scott appeared before HUAC, on September 29, 1950. (Her program predated Nat King Cole's show by six years.) Scott suffered a nervous breakdown in 1951. On returning to full health, Scott continued to perform in the United States and Europe, even getting sporadic bookings on television variety shows like Cavalcade of Stars and guest starring in an episode of CBS Television's Faye Emerson's Wonderful Town musical series. Scott's television show "provided a glimmer of hope for African American viewers" during a time of continued racial bias in the broadcasting industry and economic hardships for jazz musicians in general. Scott remained publicly opposed to McCarthyism and racial segregation throughout her career.

=== In France (1957–67) ===
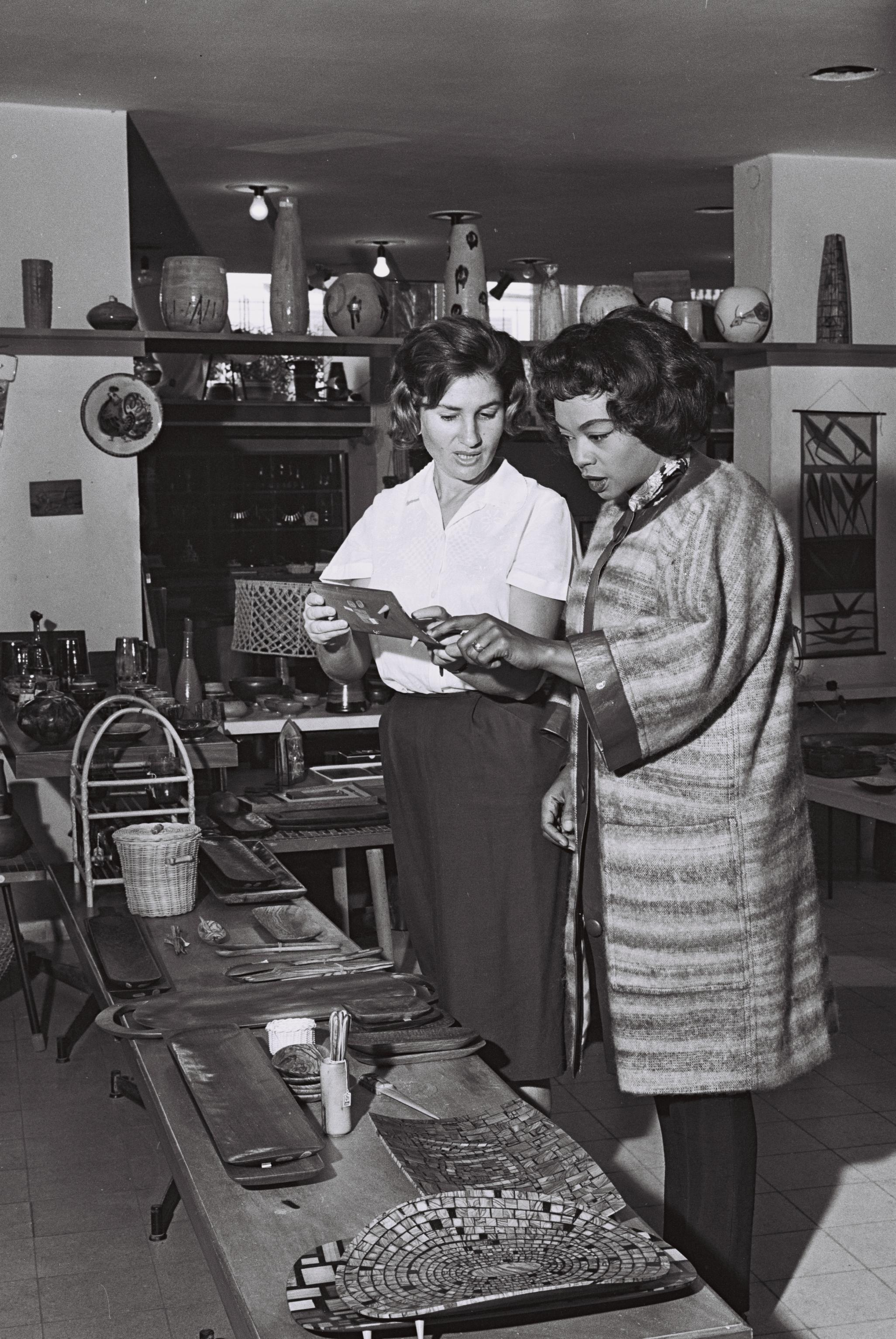
Scott during a visit to Israel, December 2, 1962

To evade political fallout in the United States, Scott moved to Paris in 1957. She appeared in the French Gilles Grangier crime film Le désordre et la nuit (1958). In 1963, she marched with a number of other African-American expatriates, including James Baldwin, to the US Embassy in Paris to demonstrate support of the upcoming March on Washington.

=== Later US years (1967–81) ===
Scott did not return to the US until 1967. By this time, the Civil Rights Movement had led to federal legislation making racial segregation in housing and public accommodations illegal and enforcing the protection of voting rights of all citizens in addition to other social advances.

Scott continued to perform occasionally in nightclubs, while also appearing on daytime television, until the year of her death. She made her television acting debut in 1970, performing as Dolly Martin in the NBC drama The Bold Ones: The New Doctors (season 1, episode 8: "If I Can't Sing, I'll Listen"). In 1973 on the ABC daytime soap opera One Life to Live, she performed a wedding song at the nuptials of her onscreen "cousin" Carla Gray Hall, portrayed by Ellen Holly.

== Personal life ==
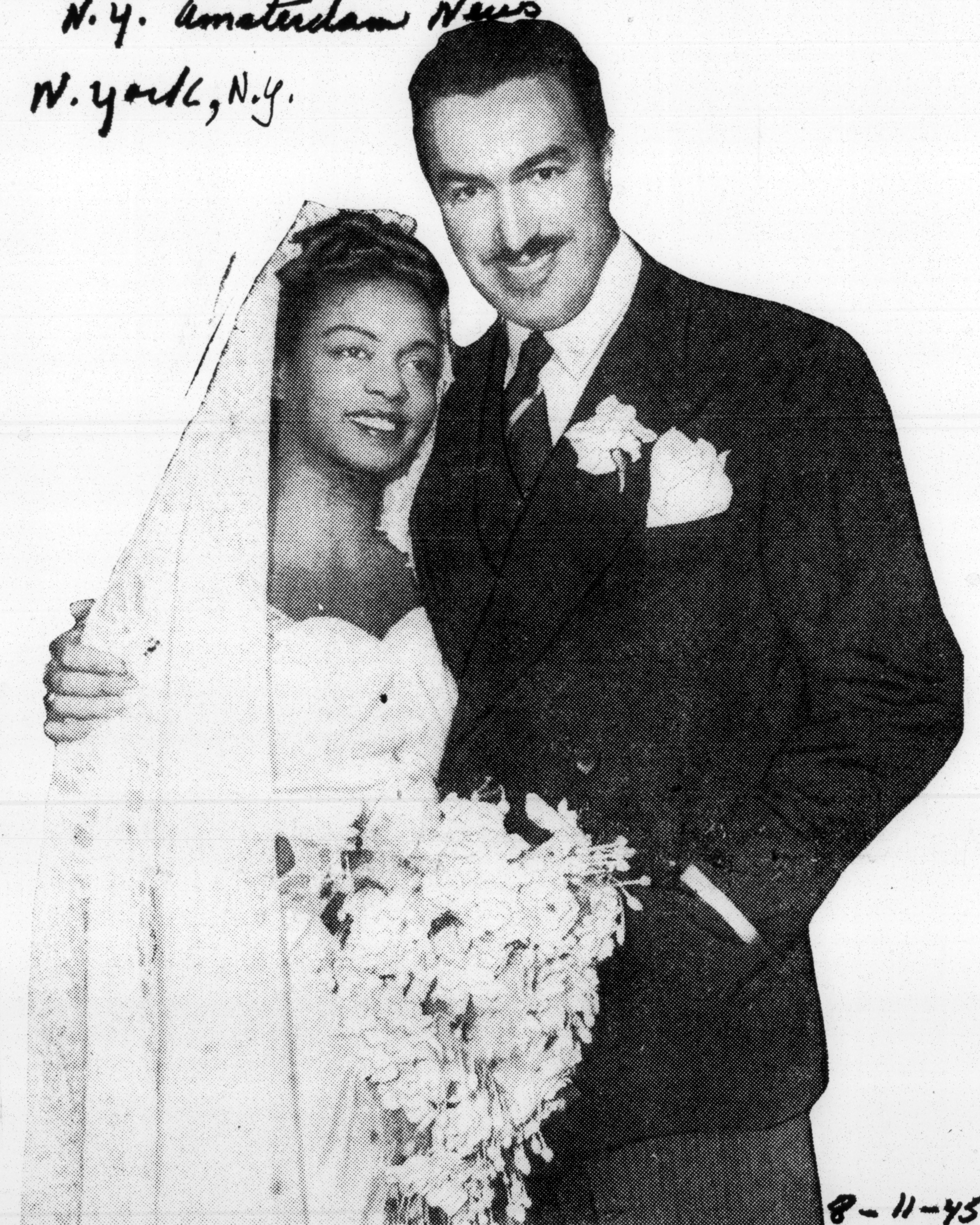
Scott and Adam Clayton Powell Jr. on their wedding day, August 1, 1945

Although a Catholic, Scott in 1945 married Baptist minister and US Congressman Adam Clayton Powell. Their relationship provoked controversy, as Powell was married when their affair began. The couple had one child, Adam Clayton Powell III, but divorced in 1960 after a separation.

On January 19, 1961, Scott married Ezio Bedin, a Swiss-Italian comedian 15 years her junior. They divorced a few years later, before her return to the U.S.

=== Bahá'í Faith ===
Scott had heard about the Bahá'í Faith from her longtime friend Dizzy Gillespie, who joined the religion in early 1968. Following heartfelt conversations with him, she joined the faith in late 1968. While she was at Vic Damone's career re-announcement shortly afterwards, she was introduced by Damone to the crowd recalling how he was an usher for her show (possibly the November 1942 performance by Scott and others at the Paramount Theatre). Damone shared with the audience that Scott had recently been at a Bahá'í fireside (an informational meeting) at his home and had joined the faith. Scott was moved to tears.

Scott also performed at an October 1970 award dinner in New York, singing "When the World was Young", "A Lonely Christmas", and "Put a Little Love in Your Heart". The honoree was James L. Olivero, who received an International Education Year Award from Daniel Jordan of the Bahá'ís on behalf of the US National Spiritual Assembly. Her singing was praised by Whitney Young, executive director of the National Urban League, who was speaking at the event.

In May 1971, a musicale titled The Sounds of a New World was held in Kingston, Jamaica as part of a ship-and-shore conference of Bahá'ís. It was co-presented by Scott with Dizzy Gillespie, Seals and Crofts, Linda Marshall and others.

=== Death ===
On October 2, 1981, Hazel Scott died of cancer at Mount Sinai Hospital, Manhattan at age 61. She is buried at Flushing Cemetery in Queens, New York, near other musicians including Louis Armstrong, Johnny Hodges, and Dizzy Gillespie.

== Legacy ==
Scott was renowned as a virtuosic jazz pianist, in addition to her successes in dramatic acting and classical music. She also used her status as one of the best-known African-American entertainers of her generation to shine a spotlight on issues of racial injustice and civil rights. Scott recorded as the leader of various groups for Decca, Columbia and Signature, among them a trio that consisted of Bill English and the double-bass player Martin Rivera, and another trio with Charles Mingus on bass and Rudy Nichols on drums. Her 1955 album Relaxed Piano Moods on the Debut label, with Mingus and Roach, is her recording generally most highly regarded by critics today. Her unique swinging style and fusion of jazz and classical influences kept her in demand for performances through the very end of her life. Alicia Keys cited Scott as her inspiration for her performance at the 61st Grammy Awards, saying: "I've been thinking about people who inspire me; shout out to Hazel Scott, I've always wanted to play two pianos."

In 2020, she was the subject of the BBC World Service programme Hazel Scott: Jazz star and barrier breaker in the series The Forum.

In When Women Invented Television, author Jennifer Keishin Armstrong features her as one of four women who had a major influence on the medium.

In 2022, Dance Theatre of Harlem debuted a new ballet about the life of Hazel Scott.

On February 21, 2025, the American Masters documentary The Disappearance of Miss Scott aired on PBS stations.

== Selected discography ==
- Swinging the Classics: Piano Solos in Swing Style with Drums (Decca #A-212 [78rpm 3-disc album set], 1941; reissue: Decca #DL-5130 [10" LP], 1949)
- Her Second Album of Piano Solos with Drums Acc. (Decca #A-321 [78rpm 3-disc album set], 1942)
- A Piano Recital (Signature #S-1 [78rpm 4-disc album set], 1946)
- Great Scott! (Columbia #C-159 [78rpm 4-disc album set], 1947; reissue: Columbia #CL-6090 [10" LP], 1950)
- Two Toned Piano Recital (Coral #CRL-56057 [10" LP], 1952)
- Hazel Scott's Late Show (Capitol #H-364 [10" LP], 1953)
- Grand Jazz (Decca [Fr] #FM-133.529, 1954)
- Relaxed Piano Moods (Debut #DLP-16 [10" LP], 1955)
- 'Round Midnight (Decca #DL-8474, 1957)
- Hazel Scott Joue Et Chante (Polydor [Fr] #20 761 [7" EP], 1957)
- Le Desordre Et La Nuit (Polydor [Fr] #20 816 [7" EP], 1958)
- Viens Danser (Polydor [Fr] #20 842 [7" EP], 1958)
- Hazel Scott (Consul [Fr] #CM-2053 [7" EP], 1965)
- Always (Image Records #IM-307, 1979)
- After Hours (Tioch Digital Records #TD-1013, 1983)

=== CD compilations ===
- The Chronological Hazel Scott 1939-1945 (Classics #1308, 2003)
- The Chronological Hazel Scott 1946-1947 (Classics #1448, 2007)
- Relaxed Piano Moods 'Round Midnight (Jasmine #JASMCD-2667, 2020)

=== Other session work ===
- Sextet Of The Rhythm Club Of London, "Calling All Bars" / "Mighty Like The Blues" (Bluebird B-10529, 1939)
- Sextet Of The Rhythm Club Of London, "Why Didn't William Tell?" / "You Gave Me The Go-By" (Bluebird B-10557, 1940)
- Charlie Parker, The Complete Birth of the Bebop (Stash #ST-260, 1986) [replacing Al Haig for "Embraceable You", 1946]
- Charlie Parker, The Complete Birth of the Bebop (Stash #STCD-535, 1991) [the above "Embraceable You" session, 1946]

== Sources ==
- "Bye-Bye Boogie: Hazel Scott leaves night clubs and moves to concert stage", Ebony, November 1945: 31–34.
- "Hot Classicist." Time Magazine, October 5, 1942.
- "Hazel Scott is Queen Once More in Warner's 'Rhapsody in Blue'", Chicago Defender, September 1, 1945: 14.
- McAfee, J. Jr., "Scott, Hazel", CBY 1943 Obituary, JSN, ii/4 (1982), 19.
- Bogle, Donald. 2001. "The Hazel Scott Show", in Primetime Blues: African Americans on Network Television. New York: Farrar, Straus and Giroux, pp. 15–19.
- Chilton, Karen (2008). Hazel Scott: The Pioneering Journey of a Jazz Pianist from Cafe Society to Hollywood to HUAC. University of Michigan Press.
- Feather, Leonard. "Swinging the Classics", The New York Times, May 18, 1941: X5.
- McGee, Kristin. "Swinging the Classics: Hazel Scott and Hollywood's Musical-Racial Matrix," in Some Liked it Hot: Jazz Women in Film and Television, 1928–1959 (Middletown, CT: Wesleyan University Press 2009) 113–133.
- Myter-Spencer, D.: "Hazel Scott, Jazz Pianist: Boogie-woogie and Beyond," Jazz Research Papers, x (1990), 75.
- Reed, Bill. 1998. "The Movies: Hazel Scott", in Hot From Harlem: Profiles in Classic African-American Entertainment, Los Angeles: Cellar Door Press, pp. 110–128.
- Taubman, E. 1941. "Café Music Heard at Carnegie Hall", The New York Times, April 24, 1941: 24.
- Taubman, E. 1943. "Swing feature Soviet Benefit: Café Society assures at least a thousand watches for the Russian Fighting Forces," The New York Times, April 12, 1943: 28.
- Taylor, A. "Hazel Scott", Notes and Tones: Musician-to-Musician Interviews (Liège, Belgium, 1977, rev. and enlarged February 1993).
