= Roland Richardson =

Canadian-American mathematician

- Born: May 14, 1878; Dartmouth, Nova Scotia
- Died: July 17, 1949 (aged 71); South River Lake, Nova Scotia
- Resting place: Camp Hill Cemetery, Halifax
- Siglum: R. G. D. Richardson
- Education: Acadia College A.B. 1898; Yale A.B. 1903, A.M.1904, Ph.D. 1906
- Scientific career
- Workplaces: Brown University

Roland George Dwight Richardson (14 May 1878 – 17 July 1949) was a prominent Canadian-American mathematician chiefly known for his work building the math department at Brown University and as Secretary of the American Mathematical Society.

== Early life ==
Richardson was the son of George Josiah Richardson (1828–1898), a teacher, and Rebecca Archibald (Newcomb) Richardson (1837–1923). He was born in Dartmouth, Nova Scotia. The family lived in several different towns in Nova Scotia during Richardson's youth. After completing high school, Richardson taught school in the small village of Margaretsville, Nova Scotia. In 1896 Richardson entered Acadia University; after graduating in 1898, he returned to his teaching job in Margaretsville. From 1899 to 1902 he was the principal of the high school in tiny Westport, Nova Scotia. There he met his future wife Louise Janet MacHattie, whom he married in 1908. He became a naturalized United States citizen in May, 1932.

== Career in mathematics ==
In 1902 Richardson entered Yale University, earning an AB in 1903 and a Masters in 1904. He became an instructor at Yale in the Math department and began research under Professor James Pierpont. In 1906 Richardson was awarded a PhD by Yale for his thesis on "Improper Multiple Integrals." In 1907 he was appointed assistant professor of mathematics at Brown University, with the stipulation that he first spend a study year in Göttingen, Germany. He was appointed acting director of Ladd Observatory in 1914 and served in this role until 1921. By 1915 Richardson had become a full professor and the head of the mathematics department at Brown. In 1926 he was also given the position of Dean of the Graduate School at Brown. Under Roland's leadership Brown's graduate program was recognized when Brown was elected to the elite Association of American Universities in 1933.

Richardson was the Secretary of the American Mathematical Society in 1921 and held the job until 1940. During his time, his contemporary Raymond Clare Archibald, also of Nova Scotia, wrote in an article about Richardson, "No American mathematician was more widely known among his colleagues and the careers of scores of them were notably promoted by his time-consuming activities in their behalf." Richardson was credited with helping many European mathematicians concerned about conditions in Europe move to America during the 1930s.

At the start of World War II Richardson organized accelerated applied mathematics courses at Brown for servicemen as the "Program of Advanced Instruction and Research in Applied Mechanics", recruiting German mathematician William Prager to lead it. It became the first formal program in applied mathematics in the United States when it was formed in 1941. This led to the founding of a new Quarterly of Applied Mathematics, edited at Brown, in 1943. After the war the program was converted into a new graduate division of applied mathematics. From 1943 to 1946 he was a member of the applied mathematics panel of the National Defense Research Committee.

== Family and death ==
Richardson died while on a fishing trip at South River Lake, Nova Scotia near Antigonish. He was buried in Camp Hill Cemetery in Halifax.

Richardson and his wife had one child, George Wendell Richardson (b. July 7, 1920).

== Recognition ==
Richardson received a number of honorary degrees. Acadia University awarded him a Doctor of Civil Law in 1931, Lehigh University gave him an LLD in 1941, and Brown University an LLD on his retirement in 1948. Richardson was elected a member of the American Academy of Arts and Sciences in 1914 and served as vice president 1945–9.

== Selected works ==
- Richardson, R. G. D. (1906). "Improper Multiple Integrals". Transactions of the American Mathematical Society. 7 (3): 449–458. doi:10.2307/1986328. JSTOR 1986328.
- Richardson, R. G. D. (1908). "The Integration of a Sequence of Functions and Its Application to Iterated Integrals". Transactions of the American Mathematical Society. 9 (3): 339–372. doi:10.2307/1988608. JSTOR 1988608.
- Richardson, R. G. D.; Barnett, I. A. (1918). "Collegiate Mathematics for War Service". The American Mathematical Monthly. 25 (7): 321–327. doi:10.1080/00029890.1918.11998448. JSTOR 2974195.
- Richardson, R. G. D. (February 1924). "Time and Space". Brown Alumni Monthly. Vol. XXIV, no. 7. Providence, RI: Brown Alumni Magazine Co. pp. 187–197.
- Richardson, R. G. D. (1936). "The Ph.D. Degree and Mathematical Research". The American Mathematical Monthly. 43 (4): 199–215. doi:10.1080/00029890.1936.11987825.
- Richardson, R. G. D. (1943). "Mathematics and the War". The American Scholar. 12 (4): 503–505. JSTOR 41204627.
- Richardson, R. G. D. (1943). "Applied Mathematics and the Present Crisis". The American Mathematical Monthly. 50 (7): 415–423. doi:10.1080/00029890.1943.11991411.
- Richardson, R. G. D. (1944). "Advanced Instruction and Research in Mechanics at Brown University". Science. 99 (2568): 215–216. doi:10.1126/science.99.2568.215.c. PMID 17844372.
