= Robert Horace Baker =

American astronomer

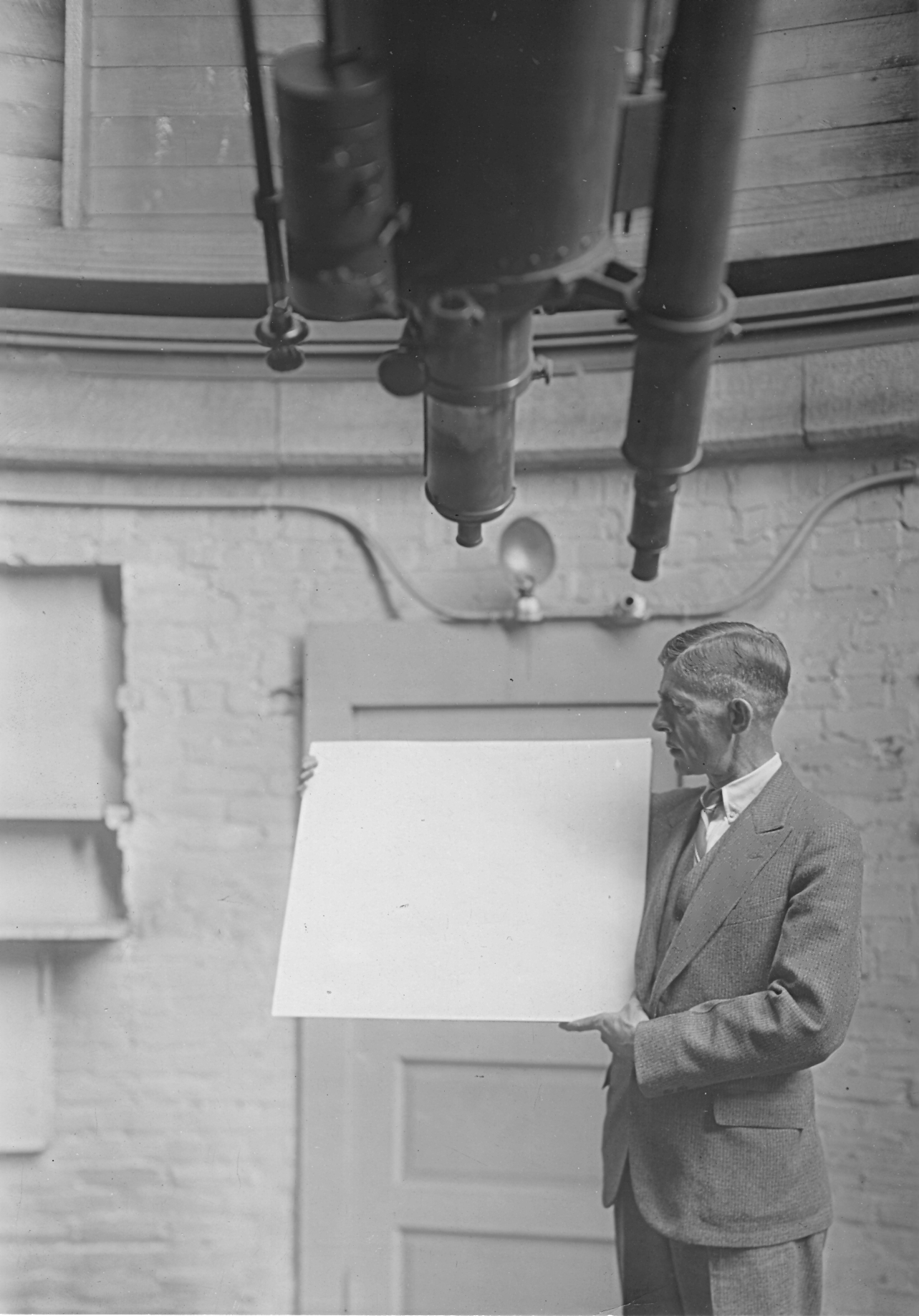
- Born: 29 March 1883; Northampton
- Died: 23 June 1964; Upland
- Education: University of Pittsburgh
- Occupation: Astronomer
- Employers: Brown University (1910–1911); Lick Observatory (1922–1923); University of Illinois Urbana-Champaign (1923–1951); University of Missouri (1911–1922)

Robert Horace Baker (March 29, 1883, in Northampton, Massachusetts – June 23, 1964, in Upland, California) was an American astronomer.

== Career ==
Educated at Amherst College, he graduated with an A.B. in 1904 and A.M. the following year. His graduate work in astronomy was done at the University of Pittsburgh where he was an assistant at Allegheny Observatory and where he obtained the Ph.D. degree in 1910. Baker was also awarded an honorary D.Sc. by Oglethorpe University in 1936.

Baker’s first post was that of assistant professor at Brown University's Ladd Observatory (1910–1911) and he then became a professor at the University of Missouri in 1911, a post he held until 1922. While there he used a visual photometer at Laws Observatory to study variable stars.

In 1922 he left Missouri, frustrated at an inability to obtain a more modern observatory. After a year as Kellogg Fellow at Lick Observatory in California, he was appointed professor of astronomy and director of the University of Illinois Observatory in 1923. While at Lick, he used the photoelectric photometer on the 12-inch telescope to study u Herculis. He continued working on photoelectric photometry when he arrived at Illinois.

In 1931–1932 and again in 1938–1939 he was a research associate of Harvard University while on sabbatical working with Bart Bok’s Star Count Circuit. Starting in 1939, he changed his research focus to the Milky Way and Galactic Structure.

Baker’s professional activities extended through many fields. His research publications run to more than forty articles in the areas of galactic structure, extragalactic nebulae cataloguing, variable star measurement, solar corona structure, and others. He was an exceptionally fine observer and possessed the added talent of clarity of style that made his articles models of scholarly writing. It is characteristic of his abiding interest in astronomy that he continued to publish research after becoming emeritus. His students include Elaine Nantkes, Lois Kiefer, David Heeschen, and Allan Sandage.

== Authorship ==
He enjoyed great success with his textbooks Astronomy and An Introduction to Astronomy, both published by Van Nostrand, which have gone through many editions and numerous revisions. Reviewers invariably refer to them as "classics" and as the "standard by which other texts in astronomy are measured". Otto Struve called An Introduction to Astronomy an excellent textbook that set a high standard. Baker took special pride in these books as indicated by the fact that he kept them up to date with periodic revisions even after retirement.

Baker also applied his expertise as an author in the field of popular astronomy. His books The Universe Unfolding, When the stars come out, Introducing the Constellations, and Stars: A Guide to the Heavens (the last in collaboration with Herbert Zim) have been widely read internationally.

Among the professional societies in which he held membership are the American Astronomical Society, the American Association for the Advancement of Science, the American Physical Society, the Royal Astronomical Society, and Sigma Xi. Baker held this post until his retirement from the University of Illinois in 1951, where he had been an assistant dean of the graduate college in 1949–1951.

== Family ==
Robert Baker's parents were Horace Hall Baker and Ellen H. Puffer.

Robert married Rose Koenig (1885–1925) of Goldendale, Washington, in 1911 in Ann Arbor, Michigan. They had three children; Ralph (1912–1988), Ruth (1914–2005), and Raymond (1921–1921). Rose died in February 1925 of pneumonia.

He married Mary Howe (1901–1964) in June 1926 and had one son, Robert Howe Baker (1927–1983). Mary Howe was the daughter of Louis McHenry Howe, secretary and advisor to President Franklin Roosevelt. They divorced in 1951. Robert married Hildred Virginia Hogan in 1952.

== Published works ==
- Baker, Robert H. (1930). Astronomy. D. Van Nostrand: New York. 13 editions
- Baker, Robert H. (1932). The Universe Unfolding: The story of man’s increasing comprehension of the universe around him. A Century of Progress series. Williams and Wilkins: Baltimore.
- Baker, Robert H. (editor) (1932). Simon Newcomb’s Astronomy for Everyone.
- Baker, Robert H. (1934). When the Stars Come Out. Viking Press: New York. 2 editions
- Baker, Robert H. (1934). An Introduction to Astronomy. Van Nostrand: New York. 7 editions
- Baker, Robert H. (1937). Introducing the Constellations. Viking Press: New York. 3 editions
- Zim, Herbert S. & Robert H. Baker (1951). Stars: A Guide to the Heavens—Golden Guide. Simon and Schuster: New York. (re-released in 2001 as part of Golden Field Guide Series with Mark R. Chartrand and James Golden Irving as additional authors)
- Baker, Robert H. (1928) The 30-inch Reflecting Telescope and Photoelectric Photometer of the University of Illinois. Popular Astronomy. 122:86–91.
- Baker, R.H. (1933). A catalogue of 985 extragalactic nebulae in a region in Fornax and Eridanus. Annals of the Astronomical Observatory of Harvard College. 88:3:77–90.
- Baker, R.H. (1939). Investigations of Galactic Structure IV. The Milky Way in Cassiopeia. Harvard College Observatory circular 424: 1–16.
- Kiefer, L. & R.H. Baker. (1941). Analysis of the Milky Way in Auriga. Astrophysical Journal. 94:3: 482–492.
- Baker, R.H. (1941). Analysis of a transverse section of the Milky Way in Aquila. Astrophysical Journal. 94:3:493–500.
- Baker, R.H. & L. Kiefer. (1942). Analysis of the Milky Way in Ophiuchus and Northern Sagittarius. Astrophysical Journal. 96: 224–233.
- Baker, R.H. & E. Nantkes. (1944). Analysis of the Milky Way in Cassiopeia. Astrophysical Journal. 99 (2) 125–133.
- Nantkes, E. & R.H. Baker. (1948). Analysis of the Milky Way in Northern Cassiopeia and Cepheus. Astrophysical Journal 107 (2) 112–118.
