= Winslow Upton =

American astronomer

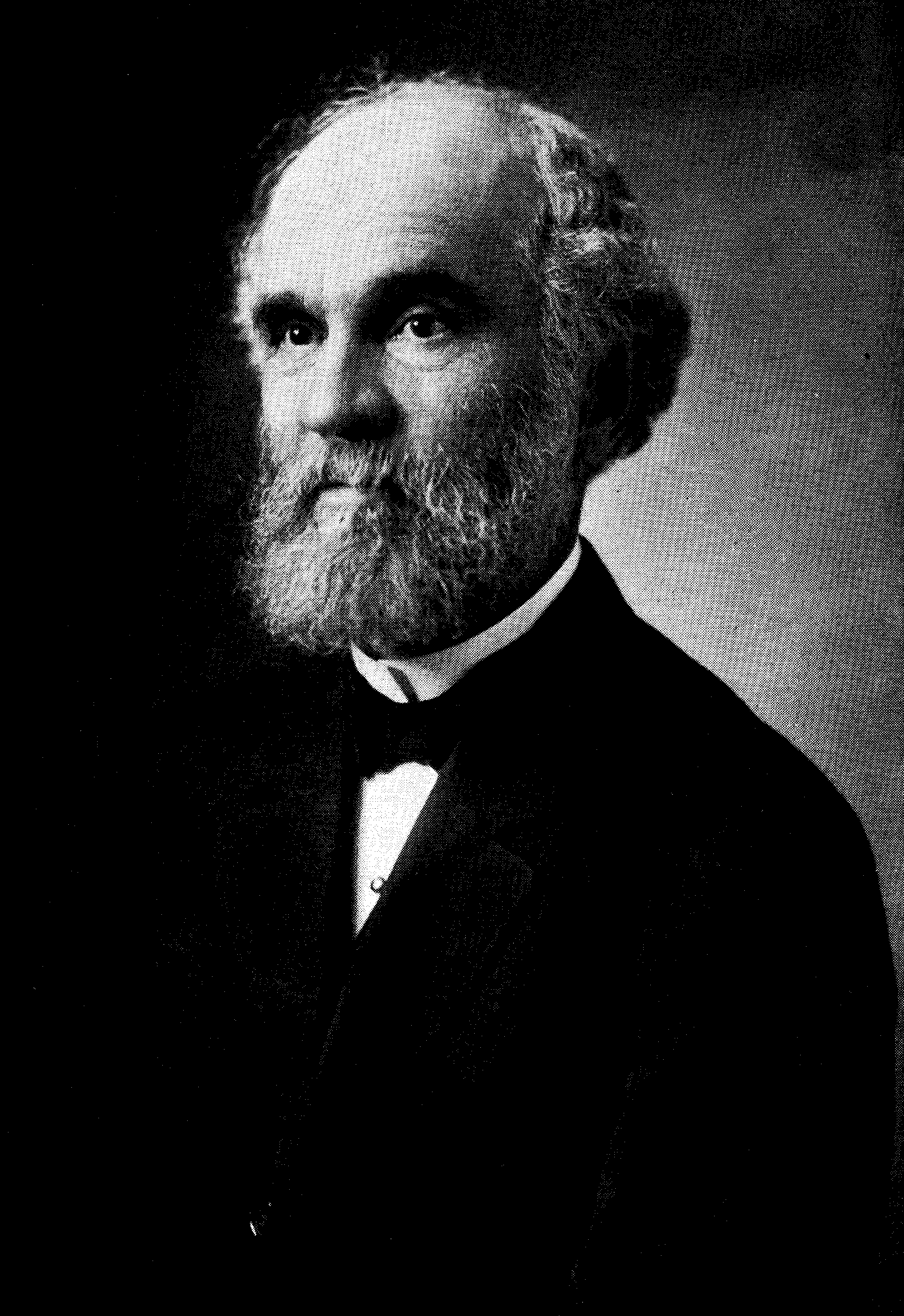
- Born: October 12, 1853; Salem, Massachusetts, U.S.
- Died: January 8, 1914 (aged 60); Providence, Rhode Island, U.S.
- Education: Brown University, University of Cincinnati
- Spouse: Cornelia Augusta Babcock
- Children: two
- Scientific career
- Fields: astronomy; meteorology
- Workplaces: Ladd Observatory
- Doctoral students: Frederick Slocum

Winslow Upton (October 12, 1853 – January 8, 1914) was an American astronomer. He published extensively on the subject of meteorology.

== Career ==
He received his undergraduate degree from Brown University and was valedictorian when he graduated in 1875. Upton then worked as an assistant at Mitchel Observatory of the University of Cincinnati where he received his master's degree in 1877. He later received an honorary doctorate from Brown in 1906.

He became an assistant astronomer at the Harvard Observatory in 1877. During this time he wrote a parody of Gilbert and Sullivan's comic opera H.M.S. Pinafore titled Observatory Pinafore. Then he became an assistant engineer for the U. S. Lake Survey from 1879. In 1880 he was a computer at the U.S. Naval Observatory. He was a computer and assistant professor at the U.S. Signal Service in 1881. He was appointed professor and head of the department of astronomy at Brown in 1884. He then became director of Ladd Observatory when it opened in 1891. During his tenure Upton also served as secretary of the faculty and dean at Brown.

He was a member of the U. S. government eclipse expeditions of 1878 and 1883, also of two private expeditions sent out in 1887 and 1889, and in 1896-97 was attached to the southern station of Harvard University at Arequipa, Peru. His systematic research studying meteorology during solar eclipses has been described as "pioneering."

== Personal life ==
Winslow Upton was born October 12, 1853 in Salem, Massachusetts. He was the son of James Upton and James' second wife Sarah Sophia Ropes. He graduated from the Phillips School in 1869.

He married Cornelia Augusta Babcock in 1882 and they had two children. Eleanor Stuart Upton was a librarian at the John Carter Brown Library and Yale University Library. Margaret Frances Upton taught bacteriology. She was also a lab technician and research assistant at hospitals.

He became ill with pneumonia in December 1913 and died on January 8, 1914.

== Published works ==
Upton wrote a monthly astronomy column for the Providence Journal for twenty years.

- Upton, Winslow (1881). Information Relative to the Construction and Maintenance of Time Balls. Professional Papers of the Signal Service. Vol. 5. Washington, DC: US Government Printing Office.
- Upton, Winslow (1883). "Lectures on Practical Astronomy". In Hazen, W. B. (ed.). Annual Report of the Chief Signal Officer, United States Army, to the Secretary of War. Vol. 1. Washington, DC: US Government Printing Office. pp. 102–120.
- Upton, Winslow (1885). "The Use of the Spectroscope in Meteorological Observations". Memorie della Societa Degli Spettroscopisti Italiani. 13: 113. Bibcode:1885MmSSI..13..113U.
- Upton, Winslow (1887). An Investigation of Cyclonic Phenomena in New England. Ann Arbor, MI: Register Publishing House.
- Upton, Winslow; Rotch, Abbott Lawrence; Pickering, Edward Charles (1893). "Meteorological and other observations made at Willows, California, in connection with the total solar eclipse of January 1, 1889". Annals of Harvard College Observatory. 29 (1): 1. Bibcode:1893AnHar..29....1U.
- Upton, Winslow (1896). Star atlas, containing stars visible to the naked eye. Boston: Ginn & Co. LCCN 05008125.
