= William Slocum =

William Slocum may refer to:

- William J. Slocum (1884–1943), also known as Bill, American sports writer
- William F. Slocum (1851–1934), American educator, president of Colorado College
- Bill Slocum (William L. Slocum, born 1947, died 2023), American politician

== See also ==
- William Slocum Groesbeck (1815–1897), American politician
- Slocum (disambiguation)
- William Slocumb (1810–1865), physician and political figure in Nova Scotia, Canada
