= Ladd Observatory =

Observatory in Rhode Island, US

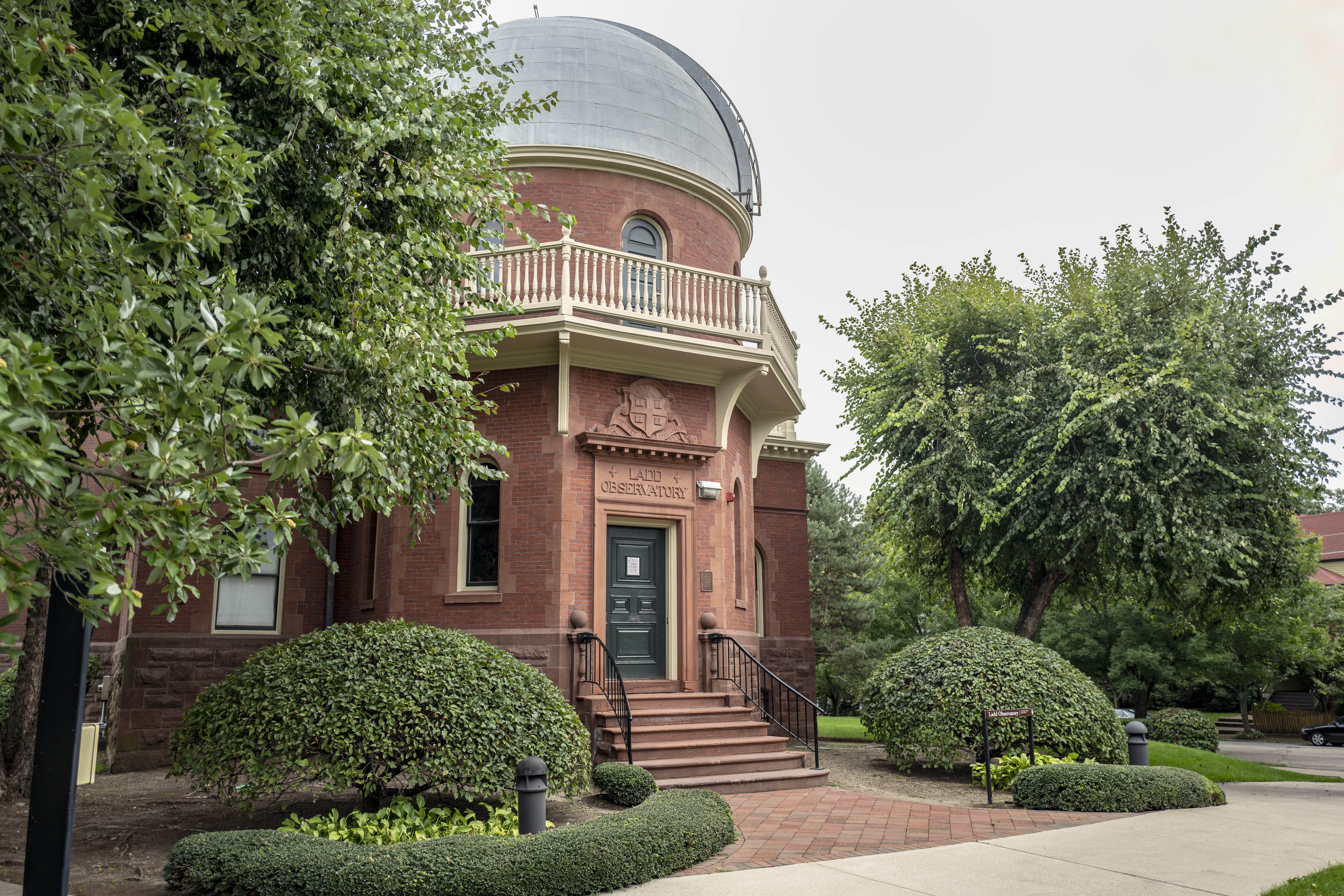
- Organization: Brown University
- Location: Providence, Rhode Island, US
- Coordinates: 41°50′21″N 71°23′57″W
- Altitude: 205 feet (62.5 m)
- Weather: See the Clear Sky Chart
- Established: October 21, 1891
- Website: brown.edu/ladd

Telescopes
- Brashear / Saegmuller: 12" refractor
- Saegmuller: 3" meridian circle
- Ladd Observatory
- U.S. National Register of Historic Places
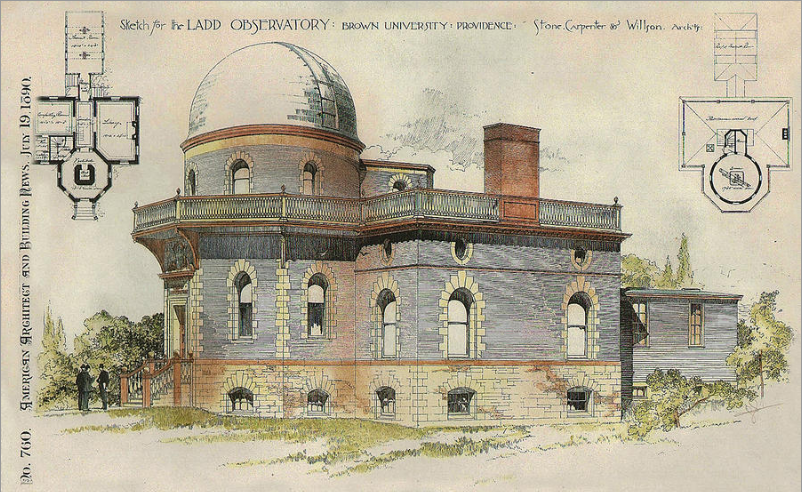
- Location: 210 Doyle Ave. Providence, Rhode Island, US
- Built: 1891
- Architect: Stone, Carpenter & Willson
- Architectural style: Classical Revival
- NRHP reference No.: 93000583
- Added to NRHP: June 6, 2000
- Related media on Commons

Ladd Observatory is an astronomical observatory at Brown University in Providence, Rhode Island. Dedicated in 1891, it was primarily designed for student instruction and research. The facility operated a regional timekeeping service. It was responsible for the care and calibration of clocks on campus including one at Carrie Tower and another that rang the class bell at University Hall. Meteorological observations were made there from the time the building opened using recording weather instruments.

In addition to general astronomy courses it was also used for teaching civil engineering topics such as geodesy. Nautical science subjects, including celestial navigation, were taught there during both the first and second world wars.

Ladd began a regular schedule of open nights for public viewing in 1930. This led to the creation of the Skyscrapers amateur astronomy society in 1932 which regularly met at Ladd. The Skyscrapers then acquired the Seagrave Observatory in 1936 which was then used as a meeting place. Amateur astronomers from the group continued to volunteer at Ladd and also participated in Brown University solar eclipse expeditions. Members constructed a Schmidt camera for the 1937 Brown eclipse expedition.

Ladd was added to the National Register of Historic Places in 2000. It continues to be used by the Department of Physics at Brown for astronomy instruction. It is regularly open to the public as a science center and technology museum. It is operated as a living museum.

== Construction ==
The observatory is named for benefactor Herbert W. Ladd who offered to fund the construction in the spring of 1889. The building was designed by the Providence-based firm of Stone, Carpenter & Willson in the Classical Revival style. The selected site was the highest point in Providence at the time, on what was once known as Tintop Hill on the East Side. Construction began in May 1890 and the building was dedicated on October 21, 1891. The total cost of construction and equipping the facility in 1891 was US$40,000 (equivalent to $1,400,000 in 2025.)

== Telescopes ==
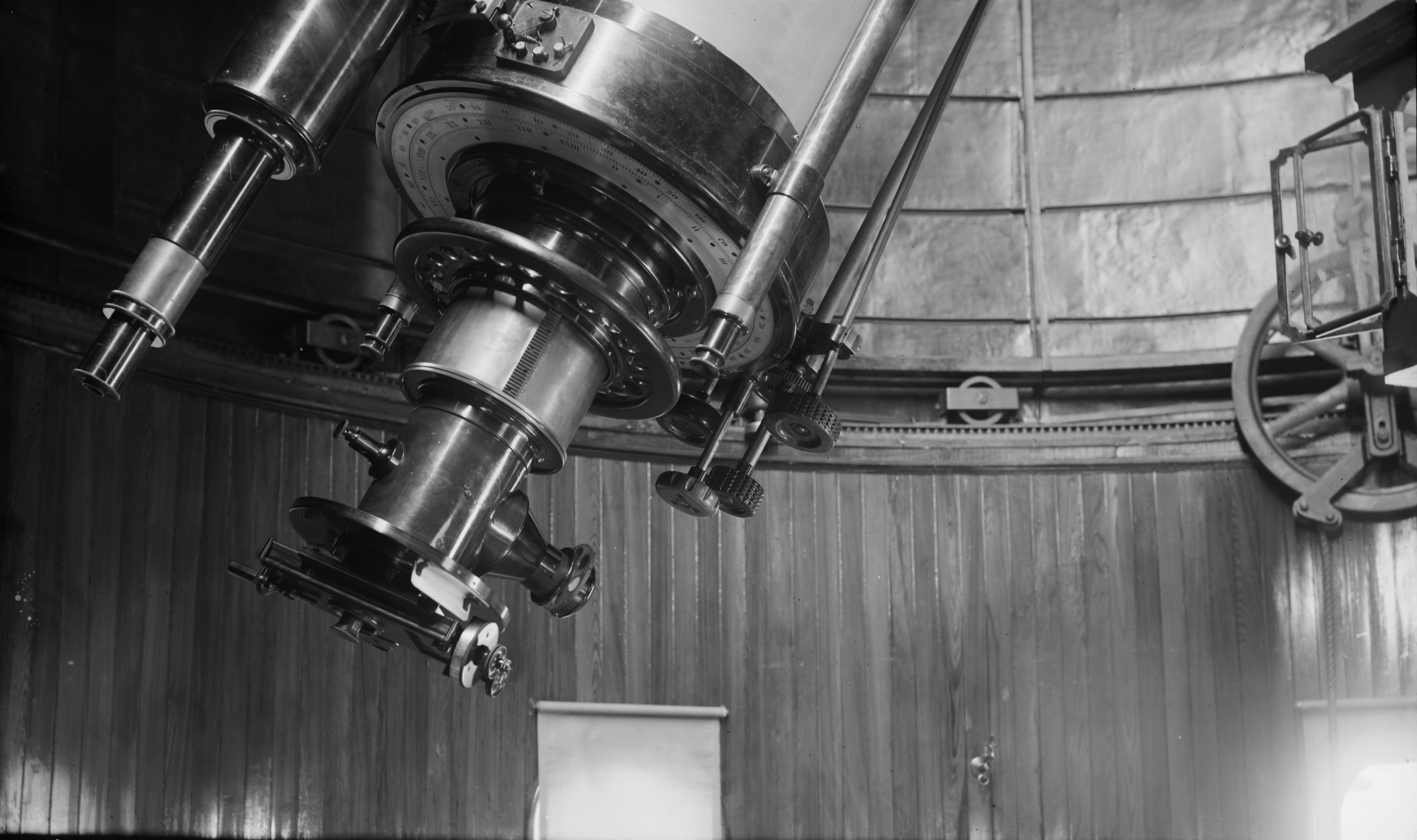
A filar micrometer attached to the main telescope, 1890s.

The primary telescope is a refractor with a 12-inch (300 mm) aperture objective and focal length of 15 feet (4.6 m). The lens was figured by John Brashear following the design of Charles S. Hastings. The crown glass was made by Mantois of Paris and the flint glass by the optical works at Jena in Germany. The equatorial mount and mechanical clock drive were made by George N. Saegmuller. This telescope was used for scientific work such as lunar occultation timings to make a more precise determination of the orbit of the Moon. Instruments such as a filar micrometer could be attached to the telescope to measure binary stars. A spectroscope could also be attached to measure spectral lines.

Another telescope, a 3-inch (76 mm) meridian circle instrument, also made by Saegmuller, was used for observations related to timekeeping. Similar, but smaller, instruments were used for student instruction.

== Timekeeping ==
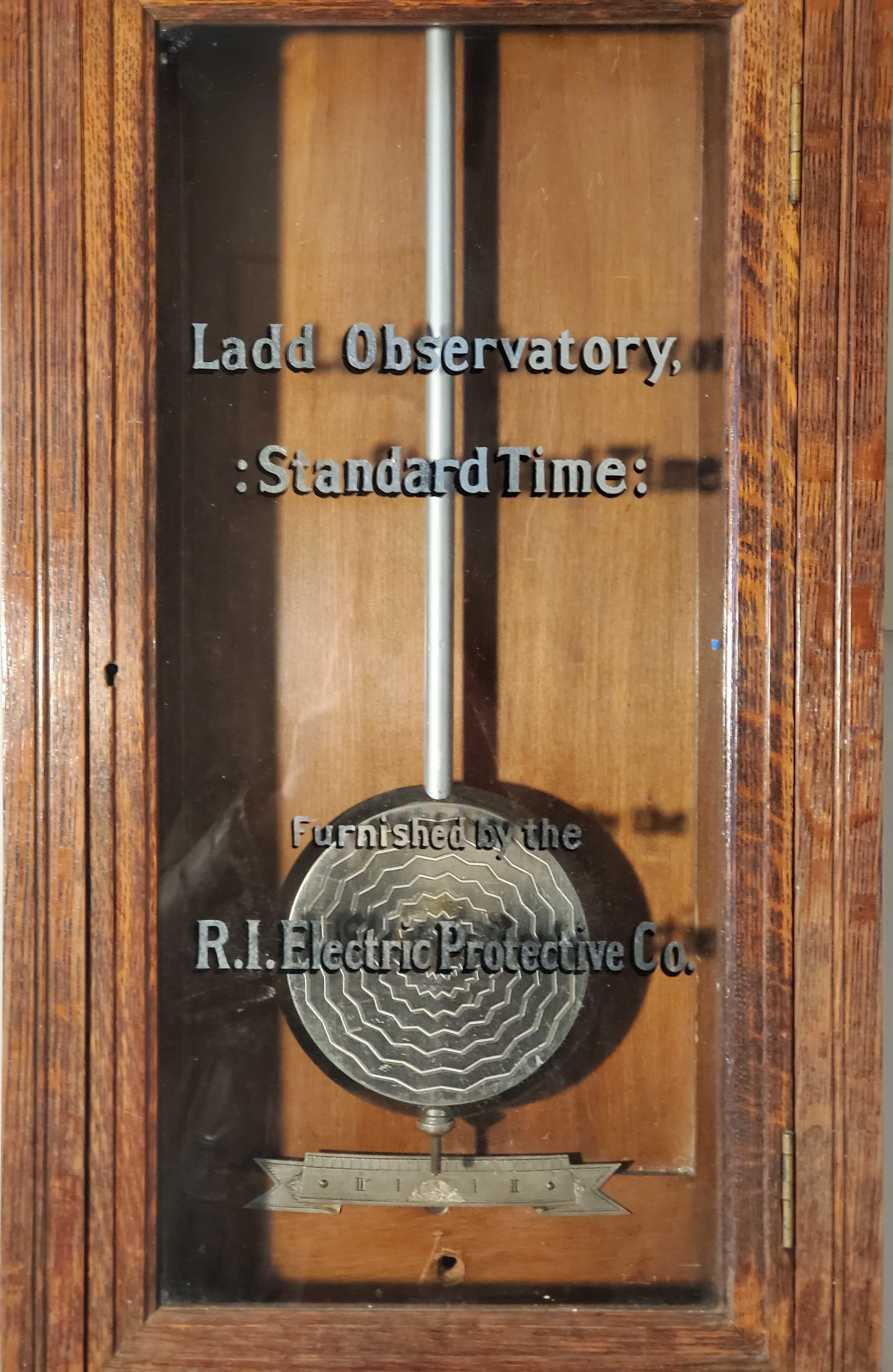
A regulator that was adjusted to Ladd Observatory Standard Time. It was made by the Self Winding Clock Company in the mid 1890s.

As a number of other observatories did in the late 19th century Ladd provided an accurate regional timekeeping service by transmitting a time signal via telegraph wire. Observations of select stars were made with the meridian circle instrument as the star transited (or crossed) the meridian. This data was then used to calibrate a high quality pendulum clock set to keep sidereal time. Calculations were then performed to convert sidereal time to local standard time. A second clock keeping standard time was equipped with a telegraphic break circuit mechanism to automatically generate the time signals. These precision clocks were known as astronomical regulators. Timekeeping instruments used at Ladd include regulators designed by Robert Molyneux, Edward Howard, Hezekiah Conant, and Sigmund Riefler.

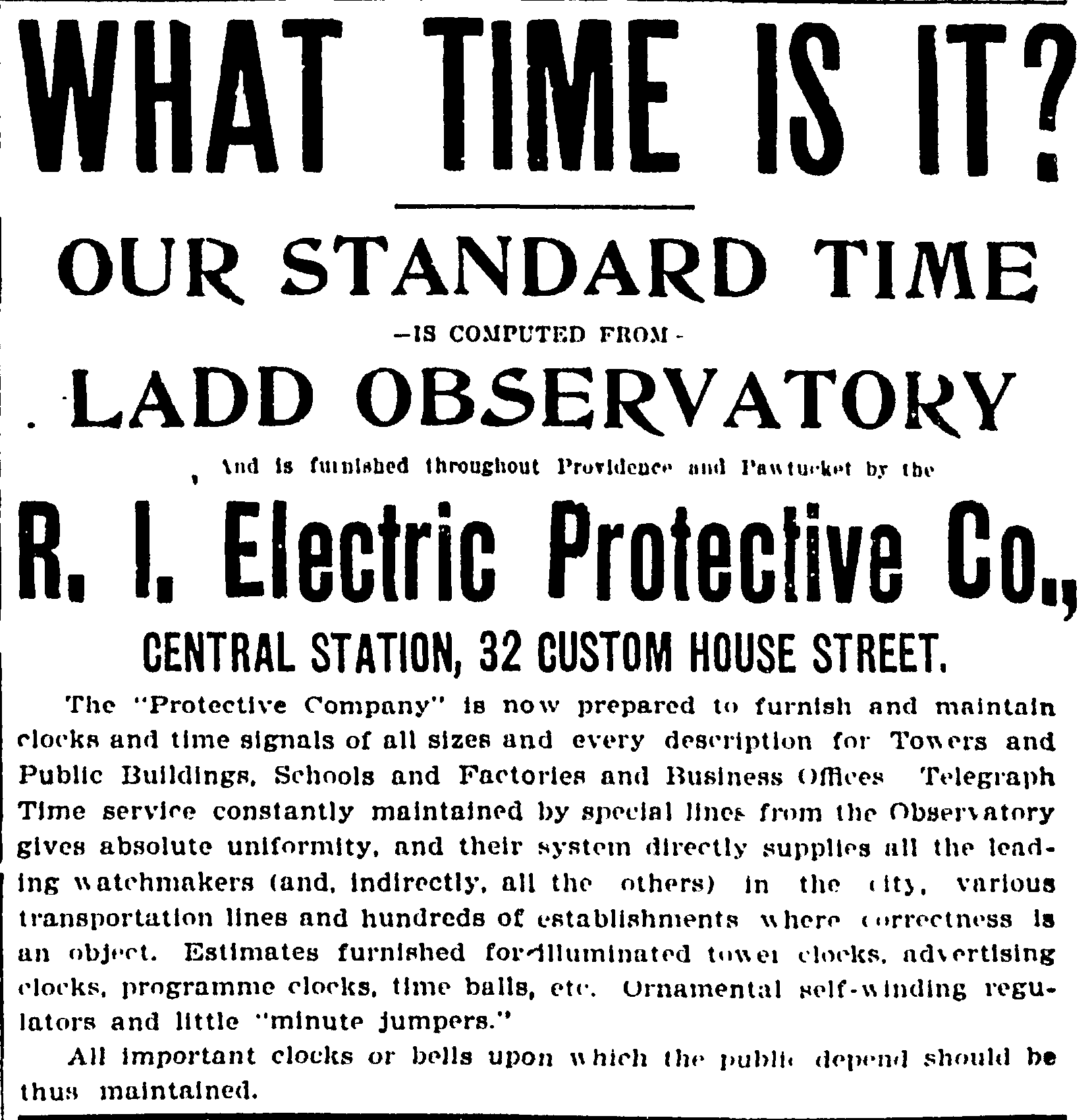
Advertisement for the RIEP telegraph time service, 1900.

Prior to the Ladd time service the region relied on time signals from either Harvard College Observatory or the United States Naval Observatory that were transmitted via Western Union Telegraph wires. In many cases these signals were found to be inaccurate due to transmission delay or unavailable due to storms or accidents. Time signals from Ladd were first sent on September 12, 1893. The observatory sold these time signals to Rhode Island Electric Protective (RIEP) company, a local fire and burglar alarm firm. The signals from Ladd were redistributed to RIEP customers including "jewelers" (i.e. clockmakers) who repaired and calibrated watches.

The signals were also used to directly control a clock network of several hundred slave clocks in various business offices. The revenue that the university received from the time signal service from 1906 to 1916 was US$200 (equivalent to $7,200 in 2025) per year. Another telegraph wire connected the observatory to the Fire Department at City Hall which was used to signal the accurate time to the community by fire alarm bells at noon and 8:30 p.m. every day. Time signals from Ladd were also used to synchronize the regulator that was used to ring the bell in the cupola of University Hall on the main campus. The bell marked the beginning and end of class periods.

Ladd first received experimental wireless time signals from the Naval Observatory in November 1913. The purpose of this experiment was to measure the difference in longitude between Washington, D.C. and Paris. Ladd was listening to these signals in an attempt to measure the difference between D.C. and Providence. The signals were transmitted by the Navy radio facility NAA in Arlington, Virginia. In 1915 Brown installed a sophisticated "wireless plant" consisting of a 450-foot-long (140 m) antenna strung between a tower on University Hall and another tower on Maxcy Hall. The operator's station with transmitting and receiving equipment was located in the basement of Wilson Hall, a building midway between the two towers. Primarily intended for engineering instruction and physics experimentation it was also used to receive the time signals from Arlington.

On November 24, 1916 the transit instrument observations were discontinued and the clocks were instead calibrated by the NAA signals. On April 6, 1917 the use of radio time signals was stopped. This was due to a US government order to halt the use of radio transmitters and receivers when the U.S. entered the First World War. The transit observations, using the meridian instrument, resumed on April 10, 1917. During the war Ladd was used as a national training center for Navy navigators. The transit observations continued through October 16, 1919.

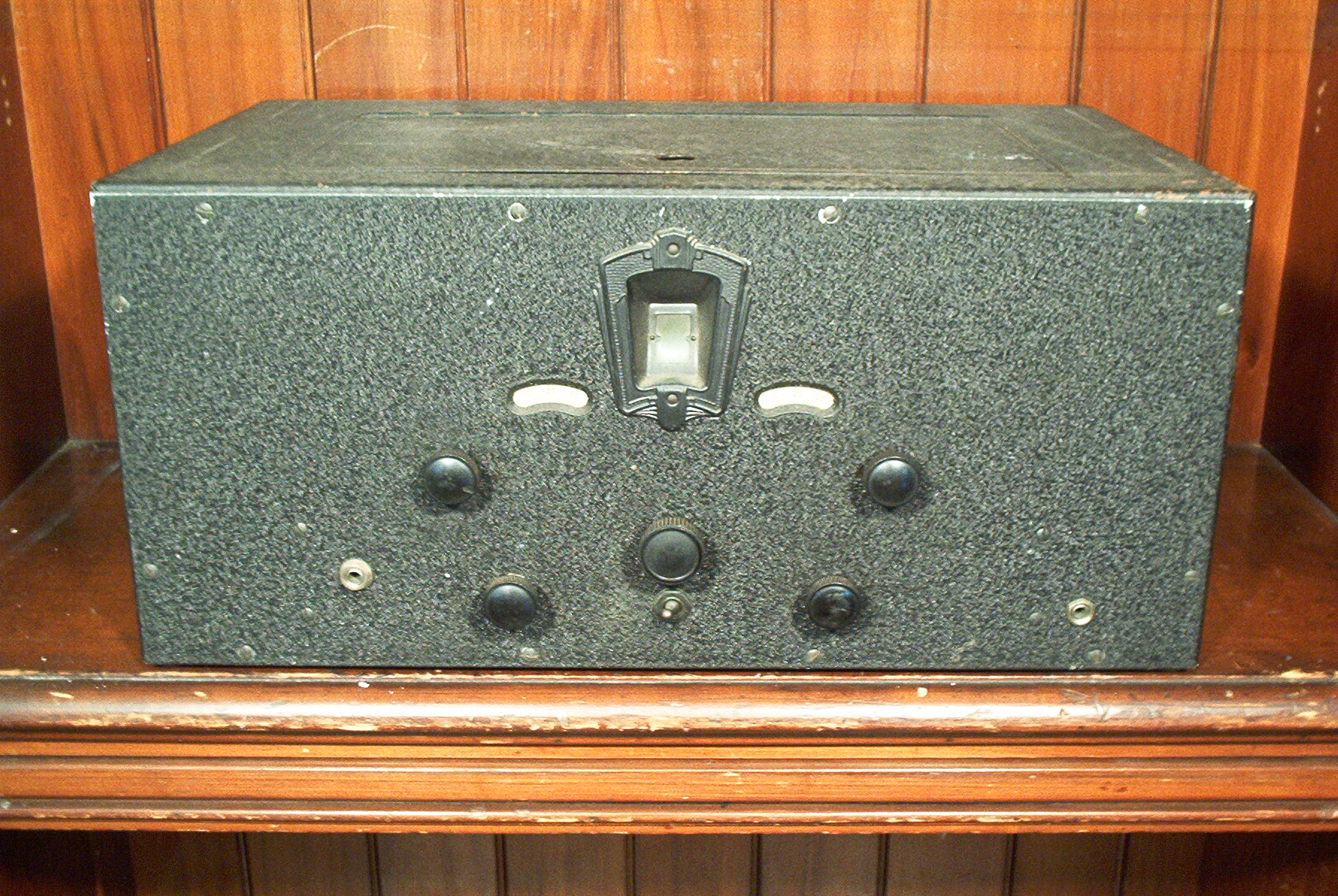
A 1930s Hammarlund Comet Pro shortwave radio used to receive time signals.

Calibration by Naval Observatory time signals from radio station WWV resumed after the war ended. These early transmissions were longwave, so called due to the long wavelength. Frequencies, and corresponding wavelengths, from 15 kilohertz (20,000 m) to 150 kilohertz (2,000 m) were used. These transmissions required special equipment such as the installation at Wilson Hall to receive them. By the 1930s it had become common to use a simple and inexpensive shortwave radio of the kind used to receive broadcast programs to receive WWV. This type of radio could also be used to receive time signal transmissions from Greenwich, Paris, and Berlin. The radio was directly wired to the clock circuits to allow recording the time signals. The signals were found to be sufficient for the needs of the general public; only astronomers and clockmakers would have a need for the more accurate time signals provided directly by an observatory.

Ladd was again used to teach celestial navigation during second world war. In 1944 the Ladd began to use the time signals to test Civil Defense air raid sirens at fire stations in the region at noon every day. The sirens on fire stations continued to sound at noon using the time signals from Ladd until at least 1955. Clocks in a number of buildings in Providence were regulated using the signals from Ladd late into the 20th century. After determining no one was receiving the time signals, the transmissions were discontinued in 1973.

== Associations ==
Scientists affiliated with the observatory include Winslow Upton, Frank Washington Very, Frederick Slocum, Robert Horace Baker, and Charles H. Smiley. Notable graduates from Brown and Pembroke who performed work at Ladd include Slocum (A.B. 1895, Ph.D. 1898), Leah B. Allen (A.B. 1907), and Harlan True Stetson (B.S. 1912).

The directors of Ladd Observatory have been:

- Winslow Upton (1891 – 1914)
- R. G. D. Richardson (1914 – 1921)
- Clinton H. Currier (1921 – 1931)
- Charles H. Smiley (1931 – 1970)
- Phillip J. Stiles (1970 – 1986
- Hendrik J. Gerritsen (1986 – 1989)
- David M. Targan (1989 – )

H. P. Lovecraft, author of weird fiction, had free access to the observatory for several years. He wrote astronomy articles for Providence newspapers between 1906 and 1918 based upon his study there.

== See also ==
- List of astronomical observatories
- List of Brown University buildings
- List of largest optical refracting telescopes
