= Slocombe =

Slocombe may refer to:

- Douglas Slocombe (1913 – 2016), British cinematographer
- Edward Slocombe (1850 – 1915), British painter
- Marie Slocombe (1912 – 1995), British archivist, founded the BBC Sound Archive
- Phil Slocombe (born 1954), English cricketer
- Sam Slocombe (born 1988), English football goalkeeper
- Walter B. Slocombe (born 1941), former Under Secretary of Defense for Policy

Fiction

- Mrs. Slocombe, character from the BBC One comedy show, Are You Being Served?

== See also ==
- Slocomb
- Slocum (disambiguation)
- Slocumb (disambiguation)
