= Adam Clayton Powell III =

American journalist (born 1946)

- Born: July 17, 1946 (age 80); New York City, NY, U.S.
- Children: 1
- Parents: Adam Clayton Powell Jr. (father); Hazel Scott (mother)
- Relatives: Adam Clayton Powell IV (half-brother)

Adam Clayton Powell III (born July 17, 1946) is an American journalist, media executive, and scholar who is the executive director of the USC Election Cybersecurity Initiative. He was USC's vice provost for globalization from 2007 through 2010.

== Early life ==
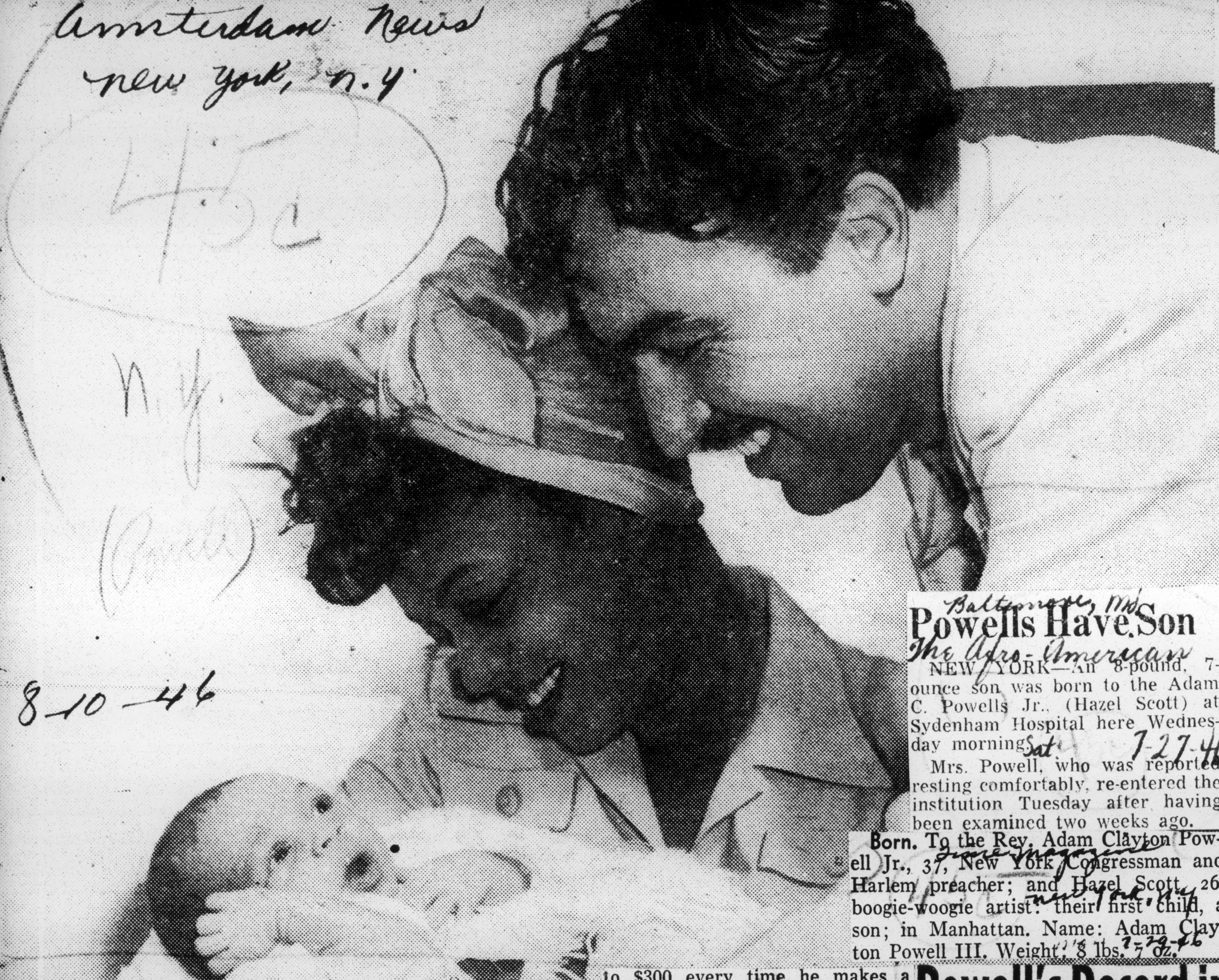
Powell held by his parents shortly after his birth, August 1946

Powell was born in New York City in 1946. He is the son of Congressman Adam Clayton Powell Jr. and jazz musician Hazel Scott. His half-brother, Adam Clayton Powell IV, is a lawyer and politician.

== Career ==
Before joining the University of Southern California, Powell's career included positions at the Freedom Forum, NPR, CBS News, 1010 WINS, Quincy Jones Entertainment, and WHUT-TV.

== Personal life ==
Powell is the ex-husband of Beryl Powell, daughter of Eileen and John J. Slocum. This marriage attracted media attention as the union of two high-profile families of different ethnicities, his black, hers descended from early New England white colonists. His son, Adam C. Powell IV, is a materials scientist.
