= Frederick Slocum =

American astronomer

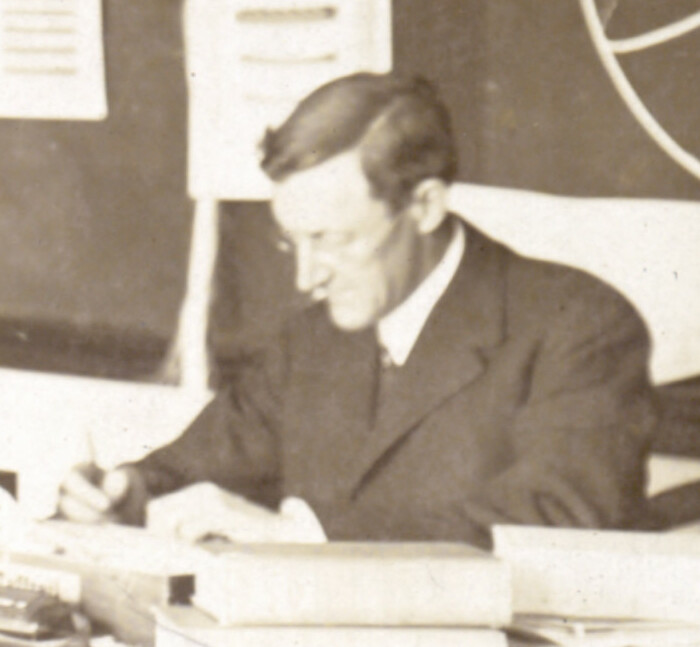
- Slocum teaching a class at Brown University, 1914.
- Born: 6 February 1873; Fairhaven, Massachusetts
- Died: 4 December 1944 (aged 71); Middletown, Massachusetts
- Scientific career
- Fields: Astronomy

Frederick Slocum (February 6, 1873 – December 4, 1944) was an American astronomer. He was the director of Van Vleck Observatory.

== Biography ==
He was born in Fairhaven, Massachusetts to Frederick and Lydia Ann Jones Slocum. His father was a whaling ship captain, and Frederick spent much of his youth mastering boat handling. He enrolled at Brown University in 1891, and was awarded his A.B. in 1895 and a Ph.D. in 1898. He joined the staff of Brown University as a mathematics instructor, then became an assistant professor of astronomy in 1900 under the influence of Professor Winslow Upton at Ladd Observatory. Frederick Slocum took a leave of absence 1908–9 to study at the Royal Astronomical Observatory in Potsdam, Germany. He joined Yerkes Observatory in 1909 as an assistant, and remained there until 1911. He assisted Samuel A. Mitchell in research with parallax measurement techniques, and these were published in 1913.

In 1914, Slocum became the first professor of astronomy at Wesleyan University, where he planned and supervised the construction of Van Vleck Observatory. He became director of the observatory in 1915, and held this post until 1944. During World War I, he was absent while training merchant captains in the skill of navigation for the United States Shipping Board. He also spent some time at Brown University as professor in charge of the Department of Naval Science, before returning. He retired from Wesleyan in failing health on November 1, 1944.

He was a member of the American Astronomical Society and would join the Committee on Stellar Parallaxes. Their work would eventually result in the "Yale Parallax Catalogue." He served as a vice president of the society from 1935–37. In 1934, he served as vice president of Section D in the American Association for the Advancement of Science.

He married Carrie E. Tripp in 1899, and the couple remained together until her death in 1942. Slocum died in 1944 at the age of 71. He was survived by his brother, Edward M. Slocum, whose daughter Lois would also become an astronomer.

Slocum at the Fourth Conference International Union for Cooperation in Solar Research at Mount Wilson Observatory, 1910

== Published works ==
- Slocum, F.; Mitchell, S. A. (1913). "Stellar parallaxes from photographs made with the 40-inch refractor of the Yerkes Observatory". The Astrophysical Journal. 38: 1. Bibcode:1913ApJ....38....1S. doi:10.1086/142012.
- Slocum, Frederick (1924). "Effects of Atmospheric Dispersion upon Determinations of Stellar Parallax". The Astrophysical Journal. 59: 108. Bibcode:1924ApJ....59..108S. doi:10.1086/142797.

== Awards and honors ==
- Awarded an honorary doctorate of science from Brown in 1938.
- Elected fellow of the Royal Astronomical Society of London, England, on November 10, 1911.
- Member of the Société Astronomique de France and the Astronomische Gesellschaft.
- Member of the National Research Council, 1934–37.
- The crater Slocum on the Moon is named after him.
