= Slocomb (name) =

Slocomb is a name. It can be both a surname and a middle name. Notable people with this name include:

== As a surname ==
- Abby Day Slocomb (1836–1917), an American inventor and philanthropist
- Florence Slocomb (1867–1955), an American state politician
- Syd Slocomb (1930–2021), an Australian rules footballer

== As a middle name ==
- Cora Slocomb di Brazza (1862–1944), an American and Italian activist and businesswoman
- William Slocomb Groesbeck (1815–1897), an American lawyer and politician
