= Slocum (crater) =

Crater on the Moon

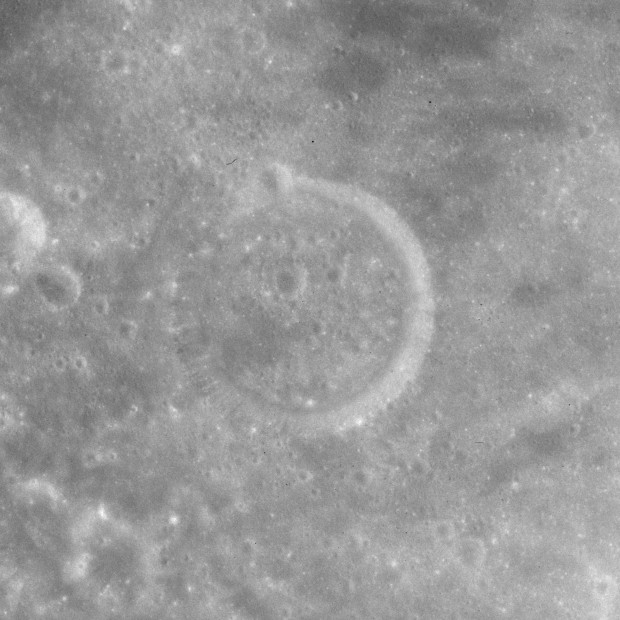
- Apollo 15 mapping camera image
- Coordinates: 3.15°S 89.07°E
- Diameter: 12.15 km
- Depth: 0.78 km
- Colongitude: 271° at sunrise
- Eponym: Frederick Slocum

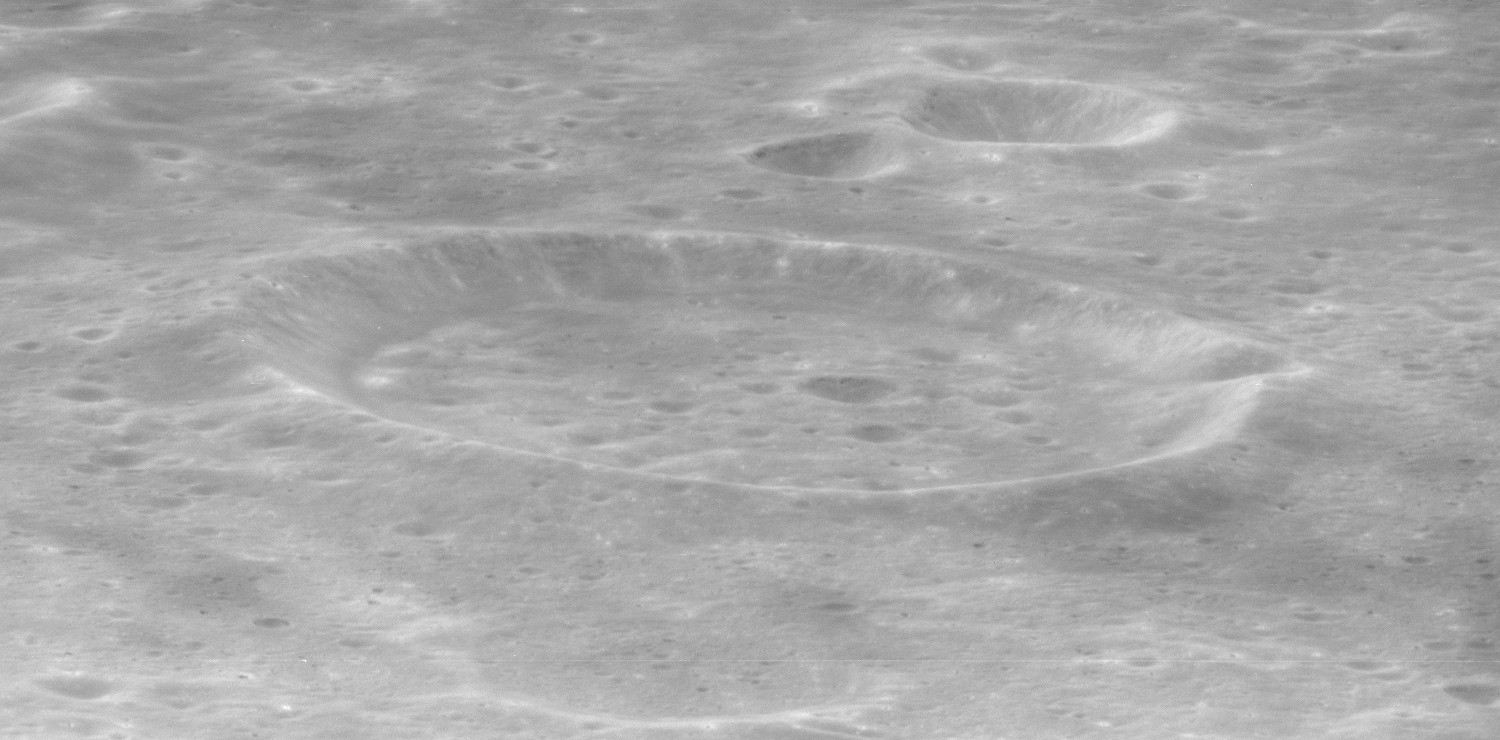
Oblique view from Apollo 17

Slocum is a small lunar impact crater in the southeastern part of the Mare Smythii. It lies near the eastern limb of the Moon, and from the Earth this section of the surface is viewed at a very oblique angle. This greatly limits the amount of detail that can be observed. In addition, libration of the Moon in its orbit can cause this area to be completely hidden from Earth. Nearby craters of note include Runge to the west-northwest, Warner to the west-southwest, and Swasey to the south-southeast.

This is a roughly circular, bowl-shaped crater that is surrounded by lunar mare. It is not marked by any overlying craters of note. To the west and southwest of this crater is a rille in the surface of the mare.

The crater's name was approved by the IAU in 1976.
