= Lois Tripp Slocum =

American astronomer (1899–1951)

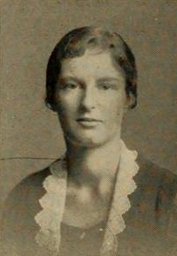
- Lois Tripp Slocum, from the Smith College yearbook for the Class of 1921.
- Born: May 9, 1899; New Bedford, Massachusetts
- Died: May 25, 1951 (aged 52); Chambersburg, Pennsylvania
- Occupation: astronomer

Lois Tripp Slocum (May 8, 1899 – May 25, 1951) was an American astronomer. She taught astronomy at Wellesley College, Smith College, and Wilson College during her career.

== Early life ==
Lois Tripp Slocum was born in New Bedford, Massachusetts, the daughter of Edward Manchester Slocum and Eleanor Victoria Tripp Slocum. She graduated from Smith College in 1921, adding a master's degree in 1924. She held a Lick Observatory fellowship, and earned a Ph.D. at the University of California, Berkeley in 1930, completing a dissertation titled "A study of color indices of faint stars in five selected areas in the Milky Way" under advisor Robert J. Trumpler. Fred Whipple was in the same astronomy cohort at California, finishing in the same year as Slocum.

Her uncle was astronomer Frederick Slocum, who was a professor at Brown University in Rhode Island, and at Wesleyan University in Connecticut.

== Career ==
Lois Slocum taught at Wellesley College with Leah B. Allen early in her career. She was a member of the astronomy department at Smith College from 1932 to 1943, and in 1944 joined the faculty at Wilson College.

During World War II, she worked at the Radio Research Laboratory at Harvard. She was an active member of the American Astronomical Society (elected 1922) and the American Association of Variable Star Observers. Her research focused on dark nebulae and the Milky Way galaxy. In 1932, she joined Annie Jump Cannon, Margaret Harwood, and Vibert Douglas in studying a solar eclipse at different locations across New England and Canada. "Miss Slocum has been working arduously with the other scientists at the delicate job of adjusting and checking the elaborate instruments which are to be focused on the sun at the time of the eclipse," reported The Boston Globe. She was also involved in the study of C/1939 V1 Friend (named after its discoverer, Clarence Lewis Friend) in 1939.

Publications by Slocum included "Occultations of the Pleiades by the moon on February 14, 1932" (Astronomical Journal 1932), and "The eclipsing binary WW Aurigae" (Lick Observatory Bulletin 1942).

== Personal life ==
Lois Tripp Slocum died in 1951, aged 52 years, in Chambersburg, Pennsylvania. In 1967, an endowment from her mother's estate established the annual Lois T. Slocum Lecture at Wilson College, named in her memory.
