= Brian Slocum (law professor) =

American legal scholar

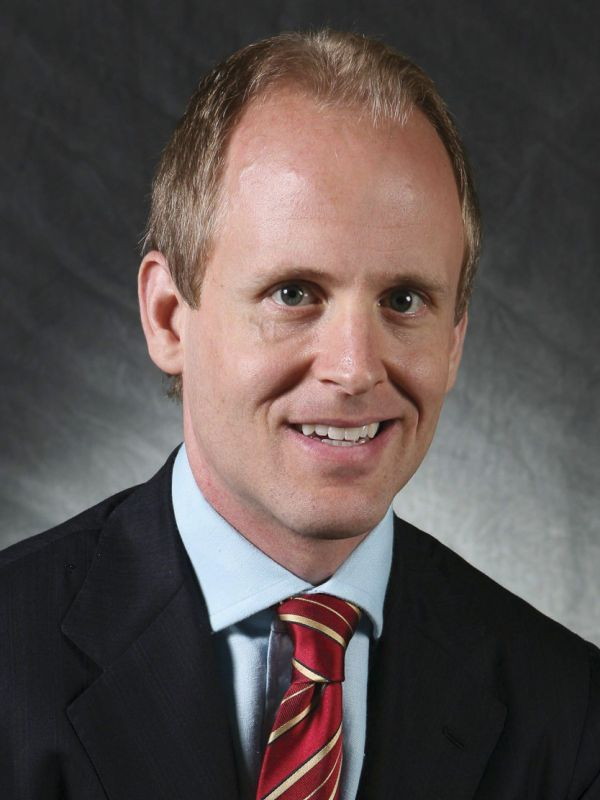
Professor Slocum

Brian G. Slocum is an American author and professor of law with recognized expertise in jurisprudence, statutory interpretation, legal linguistics, and administrative law. Professor Brian Bix of the University of Minnesota described him as 'one of the most important scholars working at the intersection of legal interpretation and the philosophy of language'. Slocum's scholarship has examined and criticized the 'ordinary meaning doctrine' and how it has been used by courts to interpret language. He has won numerous awards and his publications are printed in other languages, including Chinese.

== Education ==
Slocum has earned a bachelor's degree in accounting from Pacific Union College, a juris doctor degree from Harvard Law School, and a master's degree and Ph.D. in linguistics from UC Davis.

== Career ==
Brian G. Slocum is the Stearns Weaver Miller Professor at Florida State University College of Law, where he teaches language and legal interpretation. Previously, he was a law professor and associate dean for scholarship at the University of the Pacific, McGeorge School of Law. He has also been a visiting professor at UC Davis School of Law, UC Berkeley Law School, and Stanford Law School.

Slocum was named one of the ten most cited Legislation (including statutory interpretation & legislative process) law faculty in the United States between the years 2019-2023.

=== Current Interests ===
Slocum is currently working in the field of experimental jurisprudence, doing empirical research on how ordinary people understand the language of rules. His latest paper questions legal perspectives that claim normative values are irrelevant in determining the linguistic meaning of statutory rules.

== Publications ==
=== Books ===
Professor Slocum has written three books:

- Ordinary Meaning: A Theory of the Most Fundamental Principle of Legal Interpretation (University of Chicago Press, 2015)
- The Nature of Legal Interpretation: What Jurists Can Learn about Legal Interpretation from Linguistics and Philosophy (University of Chicago Press, 2017)
- Justice Scalia: Rhetoric and the Rule of Law (University of Chicago Press, 2019)

=== Articles ===
He has also published articles in many notable law journals, including:

- Harvard Law Review
- Columbia Law Review
- Georgetown Law Journal
- Yale Journal of International Law
- University of Pennsylvania Law Review
- New York University Law Review

His most-cited papers are:

1. The Immigration Rule of Lenity and Chevron Deference (Georgetown Immigration Law Journal 17, 515, 2002)
2. The Importance of Being Ambiguous (Maryland Law Review 69, 791, 2009)
3. Canons, the Plenary Power Doctrine, and Immigration Law(Florida State University Law Review 34, 363, 2006)
4. The Meaning of Sex: Dynamic Words, Novel Applications, and Original Public Meaning (Michigan Law Review, 119, 2020)
5. Statutory Interpretation from the outside (Columbia Law Review 122, 213, 2022)
6. Ordinary meaning and corpus linguistics (Brigham Young University Law Review 2017, 1417, 2017)
7. RICO and the Legislative Supremacy Approach to Federal Criminal Lawmaking (Loyola University of Chicago Law Journal 31, 639, 1999)

== Related Content ==
- Corpus linguistics
- Law and Corpus Linguistics
- Legal Theory
- Statutory interpretation
