= John J. Slocum =

American diplomat (1914–1997)

John Jermain Slocum (1914–1997) was an American diplomat, book collector, literary agent, and scholar. He spent most of his career in the Inspection Corps of the United States Information Agency. As a bibliophile and philanthropist, he influenced two major US archives and contributed to scholarship on James Joyce.

== Government service ==
Following study at Harvard University and the Columbia School of Journalism, Slocum began his political career as an aide to Fiorello La Guardia, the mayor of New York City.

He enlisted in the United States Air Force in 1942, and served in public relations for the New York Fighter Wing. His military work culminated with his serving as a spokesman for the Marshall Islands nuclear tests, after which he joined the United States Information Agency. His work for the organization took him to Europe, Africa, Asia, and South America.

Closer to home, he served as the USIA's planning coordinator for Expo 67 in Montreal, a role in which he drew inspiration from his considerable disappointment at the 1964 New York World's Fair. Slocum retired in 1970.

== Literary activities ==
Slocum's literary interests, fostered at Harvard, were pursued prior to and throughout his diplomatic career and became his primary avocation afterward. In the 1940s he helped run a small literary agency, where he worked on behalf of Ezra Pound, whom he had met in 1935 and would represent and defend, officially or otherwise, for the rest of Pound's life; other clients included Wyndham Lewis, Henry Miller, and Anaïs Nin.

Slocum and Pound became close friends, and Pound would stay with him in New York. Following Pound's treason case, in which Slocum testified, they saw much less of each other, but their correspondence continued to some extent.

Slocum's chief scholarly focus was on the life and work of James Joyce, and he played an important role in Joyce scholarship despite having neither an academic appointment nor a literary reputation except as a patron. Among his contributions were the bringing to light of a letter written by George Bernard Shaw to Sylvia Beach, the publisher of Joyce's Ulysses, decrying the book as "a revolting record of a disgusting phase of civilisation."

After traveling to Zürich to meet Joyce's widow and see his grave, Slocum spent several years lobbying the Irish government to repatriate Joyce's remains as had been arranged for W. B. Yeats, but he was unsuccessful. In 1953, he published a comprehensive bibliography of Joyce's works and reception, coedited by Herbert Cahoon.

Slocum's literary philanthropy was both personal and institutional; he supported writers such as Miller, Eudora Welty, and Gertrude Stein and served as the first president of the Friends of the Folger Shakespeare Library. The Beinecke Library at Yale University acquired his large collection of material on Joyce, as well as his correspondence with Pound. In June 2022, the Beinecke acquired additional Joyce-related materials which were sold at the 2017 Slocum estate sale. These papers included draft manuscripts by Lucie Noel and Stanislaus Joyce. Slocum was also deeply involved in the Beinecke's acquisition of its much larger Pound collection. Other books from his collection were donated to the Redwood Library and Athenaeum in Newport. A lecture series in his name, endowed by an anonymous donor, was later established at the Redwood; the inaugural John J. Slocum Memorial Lecture was delivered by Christopher Buckley in 2019.

== Personal life ==
Slocum married Eileen Gillespie in 1940. Gillespie was a prominent Newport, Rhode Island, socialite, who was somewhat notorious for her previous, abruptly curtailed engagement to John Jacob Astor VI. Living grandly in a Newport mansion, the Slocums entertained high society and held fundraisers for prominent Republican politicians, including Gerald Ford, Elizabeth Dole, and Dick Cheney.

They had three children, including a daughter, Beryl, whose interracial (and interparty) marriage to Adam Clayton Powell III led to considerable family contention. Despite the disapproval of some of their relatives, the Slocums attended the wedding, where John gave his daughter away. Their other children were John Jermain Slocum Jr. ("Jerry") and (Mrs.) Marguerite Quinn ("Margy"), both active in Newport philanthropy.
