= Slocum stone =

opal simulant ("Slocum Stone")
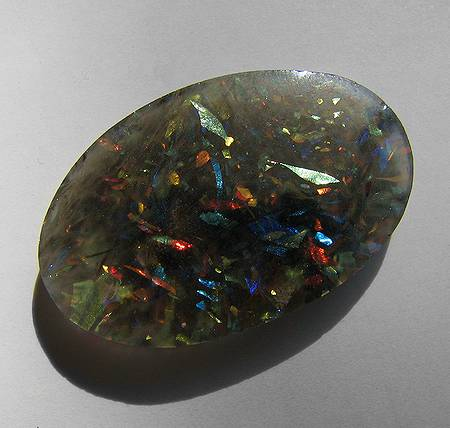
- a "Slocum Stone" cabochon

General
- Category: Minerals

Identification
- Color: varies
- Fracture: conchoidal
- Mohs scale hardness: 6
- Streak: white
- Specific gravity: 2.4–2.51
- Refractive index: 1.489–1.520

Slocum stone (sometimes sold as "Slocum opal") is an early opal simulant which was briefly popular prior to the introduction of synthetics and less expensive simulants. It was named after its inventor, John L. Slocum (1920–1998) of Rochester, Michigan.

John Slocum experimented during the 1960s with various methods. In 1971, he began marketing his first commercial simulant under the "Opal Essence" trade name. Not satisfied, he continued experimenting and in 1974 brought out the more realistic "Slocum Stone" type. However, Gilson synthetic opals and other imitation opals such as "Opalite" came onto the market soon thereafter and greatly diluted the market for "Slocum Stone" By 1976, this product was being manufactured by MDI Corporation.

Slocum Stone is a silicate glass which shows traces of sodium, magnesium, aluminum and titanium. It was manufactured in several base colors, and the opalescence is produced by very thin layers of metallic film (estimated at 30 nanometres in thickness), in the form of translucent flakes, which produce a thin-film interference effect. These flakes themselves lend color, along with colorant within the glass base. Bubbles and swirls typical of glass are other typical inclusions which may be noticed under magnification. In later examples, built-up laminations are visible when viewed from the side.
