= 2005 Ohio's 2nd congressional district special election =

- August 2, 2005
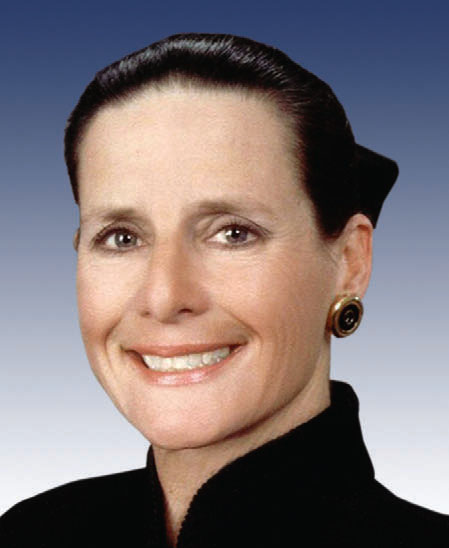

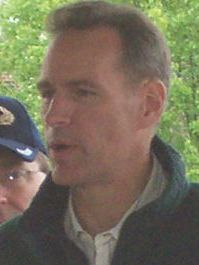
	Majority party	Minority party
Candidate	Jean Schmidt	Paul Hackett
Party	Republican	Democratic
Popular vote	59,671	55,886
Percentage	51.63%	48.35%
- County results Schmidt: 50–60% Hackett: 50–60% 60–70%
U.S. Representative before election
Rob Portman
Republican
Elected U.S. Representative
Jean Schmidt
Republican

On August 2, 2005, elections were held in Ohio's 2nd congressional district to choose a United States representative to replace Rob Portman, who had resigned his seat in April to become United States Trade Representative. Jean Schmidt, the Republican Party candidate, defeated Democrat Paul Hackett, in a surprisingly close election as the district has not elected a Democrat since Tom Luken won a 1974 special election.

== Background on the district ==
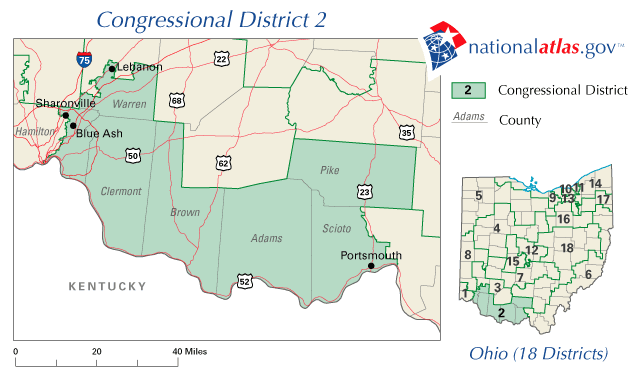
Detailed map of Ohio's 2nd congressional district.

The district is the 57th most Republican congressional district in the nation by the reckoning of the Cook Political Report. It stretches along the Ohio River from the Hamilton County suburbs of Cincinnati east to Scioto County, and includes all of Adams, Brown Pike, and Clermont counties and parts of Hamilton, Scioto and Warren counties.

It includes all of the Warren County municipalities of Lebanon, South Lebanon, Loveland, Maineville, Morrow, Butlerville, and Pleasant Plain, and parts of the municipalities of Mason and Blanchester. All of Union, Hamilton, Harlan, Salem, and Washington Townships were in the district, as well as parts of Turtlecreek Township immediately adjacent to the city of Lebanon, and southern Deerfield Township. The Hamilton County municipalities of Sharonville, Blue Ash, Deer Park, Loveland, Madeira, Newtown, Terrace Park, and Indian Hill were in the district, along with eastern parts of Cincinnati. All of Anderson and Symmes Townships and parts of Sycamore Township and the city of Springdale are also in the district.

The district (known as the First District before 1982) has been in Republican hands for all but nine years since 1879. The last Democrat to win a full term in this district was Jack Gilligan in 1964. No Democrat had held the seat since Thomas A. Luken's narrow loss to Willis D. Gradison in 1974. Since Luken's defeat, no Democrat had won more than 40% of the vote in the general election.

Portman won the seat in a 1993 special election with 77 percent of the vote. In six subsequent campaigns he never received less than 70 percent.

== Republican primary ==
=== Candidates ===
- Jean Schmidt, former Ohio State Representative
- Bob McEwen, former U.S. Congressman
- Tom Brinkman, Ohio State Representative
- Pat DeWine, Hamilton County Commissioner and son of Senator Mike DeWine
- Eric Minamyer, attorney
- Peter A. Fossett, teacher
- Tom Bemmes, former local Board of Education member
- Jeff Morgan, mailman
- David Smith, financial analyst
- Steve Austin, retired teacher
- Douglas Mink, teacher

=== DeWine faces questions over his family ===
DeWine amassed a campaign treasury larger than all his rivals combined, raising over $750,000. He was helped by his father, thousands coming from the political action committees associated with Republican colleagues of his father, such as Mississippi Senator Trent Lott. McEwen was dependent on his own money, contributing $250,000 to his campaign. Schmidt also made significant contributions to her campaign.

DeWine's father was also a hindrance to the campaign. Never the most conservative of Republican senators, DeWine angered supporters of President George W. Bush by his participation in a deal to avoid the "nuclear option" to filibusters on Bush's nominees to federal courts. Pat DeWine told the press had he been in Congress, he would not have supported his father's compromise.

More damaging to DeWine were the questions raised about his personal life. In 2004, he had faced incumbent John Dowlin in the March primary for the Republican nomination to be county commissioner. Dowlin had run ads calling attention to DeWine leaving his pregnant wife and their two children for a mistress working as a lobbyist. Though Dowlin lost, the issue was resurrected by DeWine's rivals in 2005. McEwen and Schmidt made it a point in their stump speeches to emphasize how long they had been married to their spouses, Schmidt declaring "I am a woman of character who has been married for twenty-nine years."

=== DeWine focuses on McEwen ===
DeWine focused his attention on the most experienced candidate, Bob McEwen. DeWine said McEwen had "wasted taxpayers' money" by having the most expensive Congressional office of any Ohio member of the U.S. House. DeWine criticized McEwen's bouncing of 166 checks on the House bank, a major factor in his 1992 defeat. And DeWine tried to depict McEwen as a carpetbagger, asking in television advertisements "If Bob McEwen really cares about us, why has he spent the last twelve years living in Virginia?" McEwen denied he has bounced any checks, repeating what he had claimed in 1992 and insisted that he had continued to reside in Ohio since he lost his re-election bid, that he had never voted in Virginia nor held a Virginia drivers license.

DeWine also questioned McEwen's record on taxes, sending out mailings criticizing McEwen's vote on May 24, 1982, in the 97th Congress "in support of a Democrat budget that raised out taxes by $233 billion." Two mailings focused on this issue, one featuring a photograph of Ronald Reagan which was captioned "When President Reagan Needed Votes to Keep Taxes Low, Bob McEwen Said 'NO'", the other asking "Are We Still the Party of Lower Taxes?" which noted DeWine supports Ohio Secretary of State Ken Blackwell's amendment to the Ohio Constitution to limit spending increases and had a photo of DeWine and Blackwell together.

=== McEwen responds to DeWine ===
McEwen ran television ads that lamented DeWine's "desperate, untrue attacks" but did not attempt to refute them, instead focusing on how he would continue to advance the idea of Ronald Reagan. To emphasize his connection to Reagan, McEwen brought Reagan aide and Attorney General Edwin Meese to Ohio to speak on how important McEwen had been in advancing Reagan's legislative agenda. McEwen also emphasized his return to Congress would mean he would enter not as a freshman but as a seventh termer, thus entitling him to better committee assignments. However, spokesmen for Ohio's Deborah Pryce, chairman of the House Republican Conference, the body which decides such matters, denied McEwen would automatically get his former seniority back.

On the issues, McEwen emphasized his pro-life stance and support for immigration reform. One mailing he sent had a picture of 9/11 hijacker Mohamed Atta's visa captioned "Shocking: All of the 9/11 murderers had visas issued to them by the U.S. State Department" and called for "a military presence on the Mexican and Canadian borders."

McEwen had high-profile endorsements from Focus on the Family leader James Dobson, former United States Attorney General Edwin Meese, Cincinnati Bengals player Anthony Muñoz, American Family Association president Donald Wildmon, Citizens for Community Values anti-pornography crusader Phil Burress, and former New York congressman and 1996 vice presidential candidate Jack Kemp, who came to the district to campaign for him.

=== Attacks on Schmidt ===
Jean Schmidt was criticized in ads paid for by the Club for Growth, the Washington, D.C.–based group associated with Grover Norquist which campaigns for lower taxes and actively works for the defeat of Republicans it considers insufficiently conservative. The club's ads noted Schmidt had voted in favor of Governor Taft's 20 percent increase in the state sales tax and increases in the state budget. The club compared her unfavorably to Tom Brinkman, who was hailed in the ad as "Honest. Conservative. Leader." The Ohio Taxpayers Association disputed the club's ad. Its president told The Cincinnati Enquirer that Schmidt had "a pretty good record" in Columbus and that the OTA's political action committee had endorsed her.

In her campaign, Schmidt ran on a conservative platform. In one mailing to voters, she promised to "reduce our taxes", "keep our nation safe", advocated "a responsible energy policy", and for "promoting family values." The tag line on the mailer was "continuing a tradition of character and leadership."

Schmidt's campaign literature noted her pro-life voting record, her opposition to gay marriage, her high ratings from the National Rifle Association, and that she "opposes an activist court system that acts against our conservative values." Her literature also featured her endorsement by Phil Fulton, a pastor who fought the court ordered removal of tablets containing the Ten Commandments from the grounds of schools in Adams County.

=== Results ===
2005 Republican primary results by county: Schmidt: 20–30%; 40–50%; McEwen: 30–40%; 40–50%; 50–60%

Republican primary results
Party	Candidate	Votes	%
Republican	Jean Schmidt	14,331	31.37
Republican	Bob McEwen	11,663	25.53
Republican	Tom Brinkman	9,320	20.40
Republican	Pat DeWine	5,467	11.97
Republican	Eric Minamyer	2,113	4.63
Republican	Peter A. Fossett	1,029	2.25
Republican	Tom Bemmes	687	1.50
Republican	Jeff Morgan	403	0.88
Republican	David R. Smith	362	0.79
Republican	Steve Austin	217	0.48
Republican	Douglas E. Mink	90	0.20
Total votes		45,682	100.00

== Democratic primary ==
=== Candidates ===
- Paul Hackett, attorney and former Milford City Councilman
- Victoria Wulsin, doctor
- Charles Sanders, former mayor of Waynesville, Democratic nominee in 1998, 2000, 2002 and 2004
- James Parker, health care administrator
- Jeff Sinnard, civil engineer

=== The Democratic campaign ===
The Democratic primary attracted little attention. The obvious candidate was Charles W. Sanders, who won the nomination in the past four primaries but never got more than 28% of the vote against Portman in the general election. But Sanders, the only black candidate in either primary, had been recalled as Mayor of Waynesville when he charged the village police with racial profiling. He also faced complaints from his constituents that he spent too much time on his Congressional campaigns and meeting high Democratic officials such as Bill Clinton rather than attending to local issues. Because of redistricting, Sanders no longer lived in the Second District and had not in his last two runs against Portman.

Victoria Wells Wulsin, a doctor from Indian Hill, was the head of a charity, SOTENI International, that was funding an AIDS prevention campaign in Kenya. Her platform was not one that would win many fans in the conservative Second District: pro-choice, pro-gay rights, opposing the Iraq War, and calling for the repeal of the tax cuts that George W. Bush had advocated and Congress had passed.

Jeff Sinnard, a civil engineer who proudly noted he was a "stay-at-home dad", was the most conservative Democrat in the field, quoting the Bible on his web-site and expressing his opposition to gay marriage and abortion: "I endorse a reverence for human life and dignity from conception to natural death."

Many party leaders expressed their gratitude for Sanders for his past service but backed Paul Hackett, an attorney from Indian Hill. Hackett had organized the recall of a councilman in Milford in 1995 and was elected to the council in his place, serving three years. He had also just returned from a tour of duty in Iraq, having been on active duty in the Marines in the 2003 invasion of Iraq. The Democratic parties in Pike, Clermont and Hamilton counties all endorsed Hackett. Sanders said that he was not concerned that party leaders were backing Hackett, telling The Cincinnati Enquirer "People out there know me. I may not have the money or the organization, but no one in this race will work harder."

=== Special primary election ===
In his bid for Congress, Hackett was endorsed by the county Democratic parties in four of the seven counties in the district, those in Brown, Clermont, Hamilton and Pike counties. Party leaders chose to support him rather than Charles W. Sanders, the only black candidate in either primary and the Democratic nominee in 1998, 2000, 2002 and 2004. Timothy Burke, chairman of the party in Hamilton County, said "The blunt reality is that Charles Sanders can't win the 2nd District seat." David Altman, a Cincinnati attorney who was on the party central committee, was also skeptical of Sanders, telling The Cincinnati Post "I don't think he has a snowball's chances of winning."

Many were angered by the endorsement. Todd Portune, the first Democrat elected to the Hamilton County Commission in decades, told The Post "That's not the Democratic Party I'm a part of," saying the party should remain neutral. Victoria Wells Wulsin, a doctor from Indian Hill who ran a charity helping AIDS patients in Africa, also sought the nomination; the Hamilton County endorsement dismayed her. "It smacks of weapons of mass destruction," she told The Post.

Other candidates running were Jeff Sinnard, a civil engineer from Anderson Township, and the most conservative Democrat; James John Parker, a hospital administrator from Pike County; and Arthur Stanley Katz, a lawyer originally from New York City who had retired to Mason, who ran as a write-in candidate.

Hackett was also endorsed by labor unions: the United Auto Workers, the International Brotherhood of Electrical Workers and the Greater Cincinnati Building and Construction Trades Council.

The Dayton Daily News endorsed Hackett in the Democratic primary, calling him an "articulate, down-to-earth exponent of moderate Democratic views." The Cincinnati Enquirer also endorsed Hackett in the primary. The newspaper editorialized "he is not an ideologue, but someone willing to listen to different points of view and to act on the basis of what he believes will best serve his constituents." It also called attention to his leading a recall against members of the Milford city council and "his ability to take charge of a situation, whether it is a dysfunctional local government in Ohio, or setting up the basics of a civil government in a city in Iraq."

Hackett told The Cincinnati Enquirer that the Iraq War has not been worth the price. "We need to develop an exit strategy and execute it. That strategy must commit 100% of our efforts to training the 140,000 Iraqi soldiers to do the jobs that the United States is doing now. We cannot again falsely declare victory." Hackett also told The Enquirer he was the best candidate because of his service in Iraq.

Hackett won the Democratic nomination with over half the vote in unofficial results. A total of 13,927 ballots were cast representing 3.05% of the 456,795 registered voters in the district and 23.4% of the 59,538 ballots cast in both primaries.

=== Results ===
2005 Democratic primary results by county Hackett 40–50% Hackett 50–60% Hackett 60–70%

Democratic primary results
Party	Candidate	Votes	%
Democratic	Paul Hackett	7,935	57.12
Democratic	Victoria Wulsin	3,800	27.35
Democratic	Charles Sanders	1,215	8.75
Democratic	James Parker	663	4.77
Democratic	Jeff Sinnard	268	1.93
Democratic	Write-ins	12	0.09
Total votes		13,893	100.00

== General election ==
Paul Hackett, the Democratic nominee for Congress faced Schmidt in the August 2, 2005, special election. Hackett was described by The New York Times as six foot four and "garrulous, profane, and quick with a barked retort or a mischievous joke". Hackett had organized the recall of a councilman in Milford in 1995 and was elected to the council in his place, serving three years. He had also just returned from a tour of duty in Iraq and played up his military service in the campaign.

=== Contesting a Republican district ===
John Green, a political science professor at the University of Akron told USA Today "It's a real steep uphill climb for Hackett. It is such a Republican district." Jane S. Anderson, an adjunct professor of political science at the University of Cincinnati who has unsuccessfully run for the Cincinnati city council and the Ohio House as a Democrat, told the Associated Press

It's definitely worth it to the Democrats to put in the effort if only to keep the party energized. Even if Paul Hackett loses, it is very important for the party for him to do well. It could be seen as a sign of opportunities for Democrats in other GOP strongholds.

Martin Gottlieb of the Dayton Daily News wrote a Republican landslide in the district was "a self-fulfilling prophecy":

It is so overwhelmingly Republican that Democrats typically don't make a real effort as a party. A candidate puts himself up, but generally it's somebody who has no political strengths and gets no financial contributions or volunteer help to speak of. The campaign gets little attention. And the prophecy gets fulfilled.

=== National attention on the race ===
Hackett attracted national attention to what had always been considered a safe Republican district. The New York Times ran a front-page story on him and articles appeared in USA Today and The Washington Post. USA Today wrote "if Democrats could design a dream candidate to capitalize on national distress about the war in Iraq, he would look a lot like the tall, telegenic Marine Reserve major who finished a seven-month tour of Iraq in March."

The National Republican Congressional Committee, the official Republican Party body that helps candidates for the United States House of Representatives, announced on July 28 it was spending $265,000 for television ads in the Cincinnati market, covering the western part of the district, and $250,000 for ads in the Huntington, West Virginia, market, covering the eastern half. Carl Forti told The Cincinnati Enquirer "we decided to bury him" after Hackett told USA Today, in a story published that morning, "I don't like the son-of-a-bitch that lives in the White House but I'd put my life on the line for him." Forti said the NRCC had "no concern that she will lose. She will not lose."

The NRCC ran commercials noting Hackett had voted for tax increases while on the Milford council and quoting his statement on his website that he would be "happy" to pay higher taxes. The NRCC was silent about Schmidt's own votes to raise taxes, but the Democratic Congressional Campaign Committee, the NRCC's counterpart, was not. The DCCC responded with commercials noting that Schmidt had voted to raise the sales tax by 20% and the excise tax on gasoline by 30% when she was in the legislature. A mailing to voters by the DCCC reiterated these statements under the headline "Who Voted for the Taft Sales Tax Increase—the Largest in Ohio History?" and asked "can we trust Jean Schmidt to protect middle-class families in Washington?"

=== Fundraising ===
After her primary win, Schmidt flew to Washington, D.C., to attend fundraisers and have a campaign commercial shot featuring her with George W. Bush. Having far more money than her opponent, she was able to afford a television campaign and distributed many large campaign signs throughout the district. However, her financial edge diminished as of late July.

Hackett's limited budget had meant his campaign was limited to word of mouth, one-on-one personal campaigning, and yard signs, of which there were many, despite the strong Republican tilt of the district. One tactic to ensure his name was seen was Hackett's campaign affixing signs to all of the overpasses of I-71 in eastern Hamilton County.

However, with the help of Democrats from across the nation, Hackett raised several hundred thousand dollars in the closing weeks of the campaign. One main reason Democrats have decided to rally around Hackett was that, had he won, he would have been the first veteran of the 2003 invasion of Iraq to serve in Congress. Late in the campaign Schmidt claimed Mark Kirk, Republican Congressman from Illinois was the first Congressman to serve in Iraq, but Kirk said he had never actually been on tour in Iraq.

=== Endorsements ===
==== State and national endorsements ====
Schmidt won the endorsement of the NRA Political Victory Fund, which frustrated her opponent, a long-time NRA member. She also won the endorsements of the International Association of Fire Fighters, the National Federation of Independent Business, the National Association of Homebuilders, the Ohio Taxpayers Association, the Ohio Small Business PAC, and the Ohio Farm Bureau.

==== Local endorsements ====
Schmidt also won the endorsements of the Southern Ohio Board of Realtors and the Fraternal Order of Police Queen City Lodge #69.

The Coalition Opposed to Additional Spending and Taxes , a Cincinnati-based group founded by Tom Brinkman (who lost the GOP primary to Schmidt), began running ads in the last week of July urging voters to skip the election. COAST's president, Jim Urling, told The Cincinnati Enquirer that this might help elect Hackett, but "we think it will be easier to remove a Democrat next year than an incumbent Republican posing as a conservative."

For the general election, the Democratic Dayton Daily News endorsed Hackett. The Daily News said Schmidt's attacks on Senators Mike DeWine and George Voinovich–Schmidt had asked "what kind of men do we have in Washington representing us right now? One refuses to back the president and the other is crying on national television"–were "remarkably classless" and "seemed to be saying that voters who like legislators who exercise occasional independence from their party should not vote for her." The Cincinnati Post also endorsed Hackett. It noted Schmidt is the latest in a line of "Republican patricians" and "likely to be a dependable vote for the Bush administration."

The Cincinnati Enquirer, a Republican paper, wrote Hackett "is an attractive candidate with many qualities to admire" but endorsed Schmidt. The Enquirer conceded Schmidt "has a troubling tendency to offer superficial answers on issues she may not have carefully studied. Some of her comments can lack tact, and she relies too often on anecdotal evidence to prove a point," but endorsed her:

Schmidt knows the district very well, having almost a "file-card" memory to recall details about people, places and issues she's had experience with on the local level . . . she's a quick learner who knows how to make deals and get things done. Even in her relatively short time in Columbus, she proved effective in passing legislation to address her district's concerns.

=== Controversies ===
Controversy arose over whether Schmidt had failed to list gifts received when she was in the Ohio General Assembly on her financial disclosure statements. Another controversy was her ties to Tom Noe, a major player in the Coingate scandal. Schmidt initially denied ever meeting Noe, but Hackett produced minutes of a 2002 Ohio Board of Regents meeting attended by Schmidt. Noe was a member of the board at the time.

=== Election night ===
The election was given major national attention by the television networks and other observers despite its restricted locality. Throughout the night, as returns came in, political watchers and bloggers zeroed in on the election as an indicator of American political opinion shifts.

Many predictions were made everywhere, but as this district had always been a Republican stronghold, most projected a Schmidt win, even though polling was showing the race was getting tight.

=== Results ===
Ohio's 2nd congressional district special election, 2005
Party	Candidate	Votes	%	±%
Republican	Jean Schmidt	59,671	51.63	−20.07%
Democratic	Paul Hackett	55,886	48.35	+20.06%
Write-ins		19	0.02	N/A
Total votes		115,576	100.00	N/A
Republican hold				

=== After the election ===
==== Implications for Ohio elections ====
Following the election, many Democrats hailed the election as showing the weakness of Ohio's Republican party, which has been in control of Ohio state government for a decade, and public unhappiness with President Bush's policies. Hamilton County Democratic chairman Timothy Burke was delighted. "Paul was very critical of this president in a district that Bush carried easily last November, yet she barely hung on to win. There's a clear signal in that," he told The Cincinnati Post on election night. The Clermont County Democratic chairman, Dave Lane, told the Dayton Daily News "Here we are in the reddest of red districts and it was very, very close."

The Democratic Senatorial Campaign Committee claimed in a press release Hackett's strong showing meant trouble for Mike DeWine's reelection campaign in 2006, especially since his son Pat had lost the Republican primary for the seat.

Ohio Republican Party political director Jason Mauk said: ""To the extent that voters in that district were sending a message to the Republican Party at the state or national level, we have heard that message and we will continue to listen to their concerns."

Peter W. Bronson, a conservative columnist for The Cincinnati Enquirer, wrote "Hackett's surprising finish was less a repudiation of Bush than a repudiation of Ohio Governor Bob Taft, whose name is now officially radioactive poison." Bronson admitted Hackett "ran a strong campaign" but said he did so well only because of "the ugly primary" on the Republican side, fears that Schmidt was "another Taft RINO" (i.e. "Republican in name only") and apathy by Republican voters, not dissatisfaction with Bush or Republicans in general.

John Nichols of the Madison Capital Times in Wisconsin saw it differently. "The district had been so radically gerrymandered by Republican governors and legislators that it was all-but-unimaginable that a Democrat could ever be competitive there" and that Hackett, "a smart telegenic Iraq War veteran", had been "swiftboated" in the final days of the campaign by "Republican operatives and right-wing talk radio hosts".

As a measure, perhaps, of both Schmidt's unpopularity, and a growing anti-Republican trend in Ohio due to the unpopularity of Bush and Ohio Governor Bob Taft, Schmidt defeated Victoria Wells Wulsin, the second-place finisher in the 2005 Democratic primary, by an even smaller margin than that by which she had defeated Hackett in 2005. In addition, Democrats swept the statewide races for US Senate, governor and lieutenant governor, attorney general, state treasurer and state auditor, while winning the seat of former Republican congressman Bob Ney in Ohio's 18th District. Republicans did manage to win closely contested races in Ohio's 1st, 2nd and 15th Districts.

==== Implications for national elections ====
The DSCC also claimed that "If Ohio is a bellwether state for next year's midterm elections, things don't look too good for the Republicans." Republicans said the election meant nothing of the sort. "There is no correlation between what happens in a special election, where turnout is very low and you have circumstances that just aren't comparable to an election that happens on an Election Day in an election year," Brian Nick of the National Republican Senatorial Committee told The Cincinnati Post.

The Columbus Dispatch referred to "the trauma of barely winning a Congressional district long dominated by Republicans" and quoted an anonymous source in the Republican party claiming "there is not a tougher environment in the country than Ohio right now. There is kind of a meltdown happening." Amy Walter of the Cook Political Report told the Dispatch "Ohio becomes the microcosm for the debate Democrats are trying to have nationally" and Democrats would argue in future campaigns "'See what happens when one party rules too long, see what happens with corruption and insider influence.'" Her boss, Charlie Cook, told the Los Angeles Times Hackett's "rubber stamp" charge had resonated with Ohio voters.

Mark Steyn, a conservative Canadian columnist, wrote in the Irish Times "Paul Hackett was like a fast-forward version of the John Kerry campaign" who "artfully neglected to mention the candidate was a Democrat." Steyn claimed that Democratic efforts to present Hackett's run as a success for the party were absurd.

Former House Speaker Newt Gingrich warned Republicans that the election was a warning sign for the 2006 midterms and that while they should not yet panic, they should "think" before it was too late.

Ultimately the Democrats would make significant gains in the 2006 midterm elections, gaining 30 seats in the U.S. House and six in the Senate, and gaining control of both chambers.

== See also ==
- List of special elections to the United States House of Representatives
