= WLMH =

- Morrow, Ohio; United States
- Frequency: 89.1 MHz

Programming
- Format: Variety

Ownership
- Owner: Little Miami Schools; (Little Miami Local Schools)

History
- First air date: 1970
- Last air date: August 25, 2010
- Call sign meaning: Little Miami High School

Technical information
- Licensing authority: FCC
- Facility ID: 37781
- Class: A
- ERP: 100 watts
- Transmitter coordinates: 39°20′51″N 84°8′13″W

Links
- Public license information: Public file; LMS

WLMH (89.1 FM) was a radio station broadcasting a variety format. Formerly licensed to Morrow, Ohio, United States, the station was owned by Little Miami Schools.

WLMH went off-the-air on August 25, 2010. On August 1, 2012, the Federal Communications Commission (FCC) cancelled WLMH's license due to the station being silent for longer than 12 months. The FCC also deleted the WLMH call sign from its database.
