= Bob McEwen =

American politician

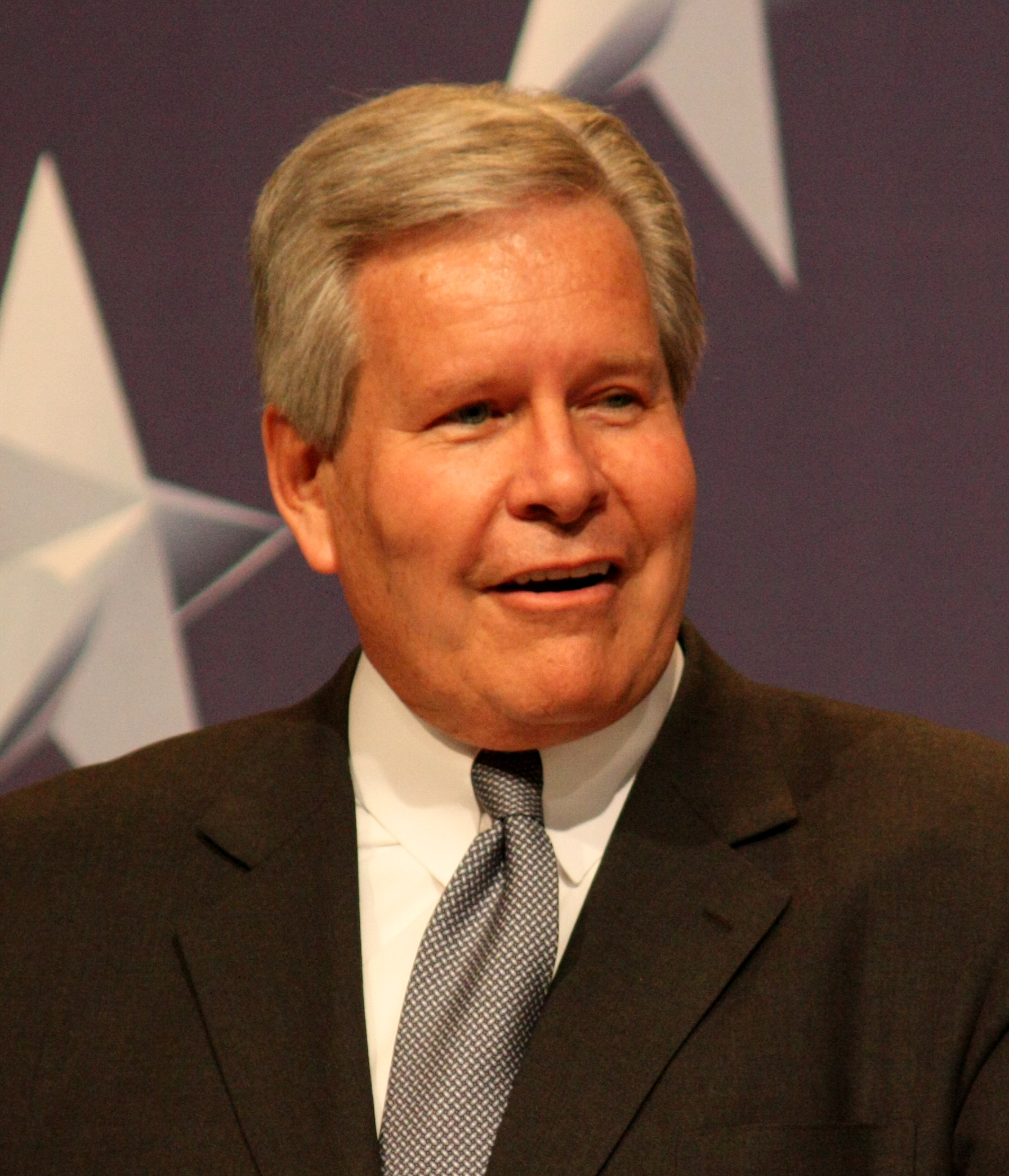

Member of the U.S. House of Representatives from Ohio's 6th district
- In office January 3, 1981 – January 3, 1993
- Preceded by: Bill Harsha
- Succeeded by: Ted Strickland

Member of the Ohio House of Representatives from the 77th district
- In office January 3, 1975 – December 31, 1980
- Preceded by: Joseph Hiestand
- Succeeded by: Joe Haines

Personal details
- Born: January 12, 1950 (age 76) Hillsboro, Ohio, U.S.
- Party: Republican
- Spouse: Elizabeth Boebinger
- Children: 4
- Education: University of Miami (BBA); Ohio State University

Robert D. McEwen (born January 12, 1950) is an American lobbyist and former Republican Party politician. He was a member of the United States House of Representatives from southern Ohio's Sixth District, from January 3, 1981, to January 3, 1993. Tom Deimer of Cleveland's Plain Dealer described him as a "textbook Republican" who is opposed to abortion, gun control and high taxes. In the House, he criticized government incompetence and charged corruption by the Democratic majority that ran the House in the 1980s. McEwen, who had easily won three terms in the Ohio House, was elected to Congress at the age of thirty to replace a retiring representative in 1980 and easily won re-election five times.

After a primary battle with another incumbent whose district was combined with his, McEwen narrowly lost the 1992 general election to Democrat Ted Strickland. Following a run in the adjacent second district in 1993, McEwen was largely absent from the Ohio political scene for a decade, until in 2005 when he sought the Republican nomination for Congress in the second district special election to replace Rob Portman, who beat him in 1993, and finished second to the winner in the general election, Jean Schmidt. McEwen's 2005 platform was familiar from his past campaigns, advocating a pro-life stance, defending Second Amendment rights, and promising to limit taxes and government spending.

== Backgrounds ==
Born in Hillsboro, Ohio, McEwen graduated from Hillsboro High School in 1968. He earned a Bachelor's in Business Administration from the University of Miami in Coral Gables, Florida in 1972. He also attended Ohio State University's College of Law for one year from 1972 to 1973.

McEwen and his wife, the former Elizabeth Boebinger, have four children. He is a member of many fraternal organizations and civic groups, including Sigma Chi, the Farm Bureau, the Grange, Rotary International, the Jaycees, and the Optimist Club.

After two years in his wife's family real estate business, serving as a vice president of Boebinger, Inc., he was elected at the age of twenty-four to the Ohio House of Representatives in 1974 from the 72nd House District representing southern Ohio. McEwen's district contained parts of Clinton, Fayette, Greene, and Highland Counties and all of Madison County. He was re-elected to two more two-year terms. In 1976, his plurality against Democrat L. James Matter was 14,816 votes, a number larger than the votes cast for Matter. (McEwen received 27,657 to Matter's 12,841.) McEwen was a supporter of the state lottery in the House. Having previously directed Sixth District Congressman Bill Harsha's re-election campaigns to Congress in 1976 and 1978, McEwen ran for Harsha's seat when he retired in 1980. Harsha was neutral in the eight-man primary that McEwen won but supported McEwen in the general election where he defeated psychologist and minister Ted Strickland, Harsha's opponent in 1976 and 1978, who went on to become Governor of Ohio.

== Congressional career ==
In Congress, McEwen, who "had a reputation as a man who thinks about politics every waking moment," claimed Congressional Quarterly, was a staunch conservative, advocating a strong military. In addition, he was a strong advocate for government works in his district — dams, roads, locks and the like much as Harsha had been — as McEwen was on the House's Public Works and Transportation Committee. The Chillicothe Gazette would salute him for his work on funding for U.S. Route 35, a limited access highway linking Chillicothe to Dayton. In general, however, McEwen advocated reduced government spending.

A vehement anti-Communist, he visited Tbilisi in the former Soviet Republic of Georgia in 1991 to help tear down the hammer-and-sickle iconography of the Communist regime. That year he also called for the House to establish a select committee to investigate the Vietnam War POW/MIA issue – whether any soldiers declared "missing in action" in the Vietnam War and other American wars were still alive – by sponsoring H. Res. 207.

=== McEwen's district ===
When McEwen was first elected in 1980, the Sixth District of Ohio consisted of Adams, Brown, Clinton, Fayette, Highland, Pickaway, Pike, Scioto, and Ross Counties plus Clermont County outside the city of Loveland, Harrison Township in Vinton County and the Warren County townships of Clearcreek, Deerfield, Hamilton, Harlan, Massie, Salem, and Wayne. The Washington Post described the Sixth as "a fail-safe Republican district." It had been in Republican hands since a 1959 special election.

The Ohio General Assembly redrew the Sixth District following the results of the 1980 Census. The boundaries from 1983 to 1987 included all of Adams, Clinton, Fayette, Highland, Hocking, Jackson, Pike, Ross, Scioto, Vinton and Warren Counties, plus Waterloo and York Townships in Athens County; Wayne Township in Clermont County; Concord, Jasper, Marion, Perry, Union, and Wayne Townships in Fayette County; and Washington Township and the Cities of Miamisburg and West Carrollton in Montgomery County.

Effective with the 100th Congress in 1987, adjustments were made by the legislature to the boundaries. A small part of the Montgomery County territory was detached, as were parts of Fayette County in Washington Court House in Union Township and the townships of Jasper and Marion. Part of Brown County was added, Jackson and Eagle Townships. These were the boundaries for the rest of McEwen's service in Congress.

The district was largely rural and agricultural with no large cities. One of the major industries was the United States Department of Energy's Portsmouth Gaseous Diffusion Plant at Piketon, which manufactured uranium for nuclear weapons. The district was 97% white with a median household income of $21,761.

=== Tenure ===
In a heated debate in 1985 over a Congressional seat in Indiana between Republican Richard D. McIntyre, whom the Indiana Secretary of State had certified as winning a seat in the 99th Congress, and Democrat Frank McCloskey, in which the House declined to seat McIntyre, McEwen declared on the House floor, "Mr. Speaker, you know how to win votes the old fashioned way — you steal them." When McEwen was late in 1990 to the House because of a massive traffic jam on the I-495 beltway around Washington, D.C., he said on the House floor on February 21 that the District of Columbia's government should be replaced:

The total incompetence of the D.C. government in Washington, DC, has become an embarrassment to our entire Nation. This experiment in home rule is a disaster. All of us who serve in this Chamber, well over 95% of us, have held other positions in government. We have been mayors. We have been township trustees, State legislators, and the rest. I am convinced, Mr. Speaker, that there are well over 2,000 township trustees in my congressional district who with one arm tied behind their backs, could blindfolded do a better job of directing this city than the city council of D.C. It is high time that this experiment in home rule that has proven to be a disaster for our nation be terminated, that we return to some sort of logical government whereby the rest of us can function in this city.

After McEwen was criticized for his remarks, he delivered a thirty-minute speech in the House on March 1, 1990, on "The Worst City Government in America". Because of the crime problem in the District, McEwen also attempted to pass legislation overturning the District council's ban on mace, saying people in the District should be able to defend themselves. During the Persian Gulf War in 1991, McEwen introduced legislation to end President Gerald Ford's ban on U.S. government employees assassinating foreign leaders (Executive Order 12333) in order to clear the way for Saddam Hussein's removal, McEwen objecting to the "cocoon of protection that is placed around him because he holds the position that he holds as leader of his country."

=== Considers Senate run ===
In October 1987, encouraged by Senator Phil Gramm of Texas, McEwen announced he would challenge Senator Howard M. Metzenbaum, a Democrat, in his 1988 bid for re-election, but McEwen found he lacked statewide support and would face a strong primary challenger in Cleveland mayor George V. Voinovich. He dropped out of the race in December. McEwen's name was floated in 1991 as a possible challenger in 1992 to Ohio's other senator, John Glenn, another Democrat, but McEwen did not enter the race.

=== Easily reelected ===
McEwen was easily re-elected to the House in every election but his last. In 1982, he defeated Lynn Alan Grimshaw, 92,135 to 63,435, and in the Reagan landslide of 1984 he beat Bob Smith nearly three-to-one, 150,101 to 52,727. In 1986 and 1988 he faced Gordon R. Roberts, defeating him two-to-one in 1986 (106,354 to 42,155 with independent Amos Seeley receiving a scattering) and three-to-one in 1988 (152,235 to 52,635). In the rematch, McEwen outspent Roberts twenty-to-one, $884,754 to $43,485. McEwen in 1990 beat his opponent, Raymond S. Mitchell — who the Dayton Daily News said "is an unknown small businessman who hasn't thought things through" — by three to one. The tally was 117,200 to 47,415 in a race where Mitchell was outspent seventeen-to-one, McEwen spending $196,934 and Mitchell $11,171. Congressional Quarterly's Politics in America pronounced him "invincible" in his district.

=== In the spotlight in his last term ===
McEwen served on the Public Works and Transportation and Veterans' Affairs Committees from his election to 1991. By 1989, he had risen to be the ranking minority member of the Public Works Committee's Economic Development Subcommittee and was sixth in seniority on the full committee. During the 99th and 100th Congresses, he was also a member of the Select Committee on Intelligence. During his last term, in the 102nd Congress, he left Public Works and Veterans' Affairs for the powerful Rules Committee and served on its Legislative Process Subcommittee. He was chosen for the Rules Committee by Republican leader Bob Michel of Illinois, but McEwen would grumble that "the Committee on Rules is stacked in a partisan manner 2 to 1 plus 1" by the Democratic majority. During the 102nd Congress, he was also on the Select Committee on Children, Families, and Youth.

Late in his Congressional career, he began regular appearances on public affairs programs such as Nightline and the MacNeil-Lehrer NewsHour and was often a guest on C-SPAN and the Cable News Network. Martin Gottlieb of the Dayton Daily News, a Democratic newspaper, thought McEwen's performances showed why he had remained in the background previously:

In the past, McEwen's ambition has taken the form of interest in higher office. Twice he made feints about seeking statewide office. But he didn't want to risk his congressional seat. Now he's found a way to nurse a healthy level of ambition without taking that risk. He has, of course, a pronounced tendency to be wrong about the issues . . . . Most typically, he appears as an ideological combatant. He seems to be selling himself to the nation's conservatives as an attractive spokesman. He's got enough talent to do it. In the days when McEwen was content to be a back-bencher, he was criticized on this page for his irrelevance on the important issues. Now, however, it is clear that the nation as a whole was better off when he was keeping his views to himself.

In his decade in Congress, McEwen compiled a conservative voting record, usually scoring in the single digits in the annual Americans for Democratic Action ratings and 85% or higher in the American Conservative Union's similar polls, though McEwen was never one of the most conservative Republicans in the House nor the most conservative Republican in the Ohio delegation.

McEwen often joined his fellow Republicans in making special order speeches in the House, which occur after the business for the day has concluded and are made to a nearly empty chamber. McEwen's ally Newt Gingrich of Georgia had discovered that, thanks to the C-SPAN cable network's promise of "gavel-to-gavel coverage" of the House, he and his fellow conservatives such as McEwen, Mississippi's Trent Lott, California's Robert K. Dornan, and Pennsylvania's Robert S. Walker could speak directly to Americans. Congressional Quarterly wrote viewers often found "McEwen playing the trusty sidekick Sancho Panza to Bob Dornan of California, both tilting at the latest liberal windmill."

== 1992 campaign ==
=== New district lines ===
McEwen easily won re-election in every race save his last and was seen as unbeatable in his district. However, Ohio lost two seats in the 1990 reapportionment. The Democrats and Republicans in the Ohio General Assembly struck a deal to eliminate one Democratic and one Republican district, as one congressman from each party was expected to retire. The Republican expected to retire was Clarence E. Miller, a thirteen-term veteran called "chairman of the caucus of the obscure" for his invisibility on Capitol Hill. However, Miller surprised everyone by deciding to run for a fourteenth term. The Democrats in the Statehouse would not reconsider the deal and Miller's Tenth District was obliterated.

The new district map was not agreed upon by the General Assembly until March 26, 1992, one week before the filing deadline for the primary originally scheduled for May 5. Governor George Voinovich signed the new map into law on March 27, and on April 1 the General Assembly moved the primary to June 2. Miller's hometown of Lancaster was placed in freshman Dave Hobson's Springfield-based Seventh District, but Miller chose to run in the Sixth District against McEwen since the largest piece of his old district — five counties — was placed in the new Sixth. Miller's decision was also impacted by his strong personal distaste for McEwen.

After being hurt in a fall in his bathtub after slipping on a bar of soap, Miller was expected to withdraw and the Republican leadership hoped for a deal as late as May 15, the day Miller was to hold a press conference Ohio political observers thought he would use to announce his withdrawal. However, Miller stayed in the race and the two incumbents faced each other in the Republican primary on June 2, 1992.

=== Miller and McEwen spar ===
The primary race was bitter. Miller called McEwen "Pinocchio," and McEwen said of Miller, "His misrepresentations and falsehoods are gargantuan. I tried to be his best friend in the delegation. I am deeply disappointed at the meanness of his effort." Tom Deimer of Cleveland's Plain Dealer wrote that the two candidates were largely identical on the issues: "both are textbook Republican conservatives, opposed to abortion, gun control, high taxes, and costly government programs — unless located in their districts." Miller noted he had no overdrafts at the House bank, saying, "the score is 166 to nothing." McEwen said "every one of my checks was free and clear. Every month's statement had a balance." McEwen ran commercials against Miller claiming the long-time congressman "has fallen out of touch with Ohio" and "doesn't live in our district and isn't even registered to vote here." Miller struck back in a live-television interview by taking a Wheat Thin, claiming it to be McEwen, and then taking a bite out of it.

=== Close results ===
The 1992 primary was so close it forced a recount and prompted a lawsuit. When Ohio Secretary of State Bob Taft dismissed Miller's charges of voting irregularities in Highland, Hocking and Warren counties, Miller filed suit in the Ohio Supreme Court. Miller dropped his court challenge in August and then only because his campaign treasury was exhausted. In the final count, McEwen won 33,219 votes to Miller's 32,922, a plurality of 297 votes. In the end, McEwen's geographic advantage (he retained 59% of his old territory) put him over the top. Ominously, however, Miller trounced him in the five counties that had been in Miller's old district.

After the final result, Miller refused to endorse McEwen, though McEwen tried to soothe feelings by introducing H.R. 5727 in the House to name the dam and locks on the Ohio River near Gallipolis after Miller. Miller carried an unsuccessful legal challenge to the redistricting to the United States Supreme Court, insisting district lines should be drawn on a politically neutral basis.

=== Defeated in the general election ===
The old Sixth District was centered in southwestern and south-central Ohio around McEwen's hometown, Hillsboro. After redistricting, McEwen found himself running in a huge area stretching from Lebanon to Marietta. This new district was very difficult to campaign in. It spilled across six media markets, meaning that McEwen had to buy ads in cities where most of the viewers couldn't vote in the district. It also lacked any large cities and possessed few unifying elements. His Democratic opponent was psychologist Ted Strickland, whom he had defeated in his initial run in 1980.

Pat Buchanan, the conservative columnist who challenged President Bush in the 1992 presidential primaries, came to Ohio to campaign for McEwen, as did Vice President Dan Quayle and Oliver North. Though George H. W. Bush won the district, McEwen was narrowly defeated by Strickland in the general election on November 3. While he won 55–45 in the area he once represented, McEwen did not win in any of the counties that had once been in Miller's district, losing the unfamiliar territory 59-41. Strickland received 122,720 votes to McEwen's 119,252, a plurality of only 3,468. "I think McEwen's loss was a case of bounced checks and some arrogance," said Alfred Tuchfarber, a political science professor at the University of Cincinnati who runs the Ohio Poll. "He just had a certain personal arrogance about him that didn't go down well in a poor district." Strickland said, "I ran against Pat Robertson, Pat Buchanan, the National Rifle Association and Right-to-Life. They threw everything at me. I'm just so happy I beat back those guys. I think they're so divisive."

== Run in the second district in 1993 ==
McEwen then sought election to the House in the Second District near Cincinnati, immediately west of his former district, and which contained some territory he represented in the 1980s. The election was to fill the vacancy caused by Willis D. Gradison's resignation to become a lobbyist for the insurance industry on January 31, 1993, three months after his re-election. "It's important that we have an experienced person to fight for jobs for Southwest Ohio. We need to bring economic growth to our area," McEwen said. "It's important that we have someone who can hit the ground running, representing our values of economic growth and low taxes." Though a congressman does not need to live in the district he represents, McEwen put his home in Hillsboro up for sale and rented a home in Bethel in Clermont County.

In the Republican primary on March 16, McEwen faced trade lawyer Rob Portman, who had worked in the White House under President George H. W. Bush; real estate developer Jay Buchert, the president of the National Association of Home Builders; and several lesser known candidates: real estate appraiser Garland Eugene Crawford of Loveland; anti-abortion activist Ken Callis of the Cincinnati suburb of Wyoming; Robert W. Dorsey, a professor at the University of Cincinnati and township trustee in Hamilton County's Anderson Township; and Ku Klux Klan leader Van Darrell Loman of Cheviot. Three other candidates filed and qualified but withdrew from the primary, former Madeira mayor Mary Anne Christie; Lebanon attorney Bruce Gudenkauf, a member of the Warren County Republican Party's central committee; and Donnie Jones, city auditor in Norwood.

In February the press reported that, according to campaign finance filings, McEwen trailed both Buchert and Portman in funds, Buchert having three times the treasury McEwen did. McEwen was endorsed by Oliver North, whose prosecution in the Iran-Contra Affair McEwen had labeled a "political witch hunt" when he was in Congress. McEwen also criticized Portman for lobbying Congress to pass the tax increase President George H. W. Bush supported when Portman was a White House aide. He also criticized Portman for being a lobbyist for Oman. McEwen brought his former House colleague Jack Kemp to Ohio to campaign for him.

McEwen faced questions about the bounced checks he had written on the House bank. Buchert ran campaign commercials citing McEwen's checks, the expenses of his Congressional office, and his campaign finance disclosures, while noting Portman was "the handpicked choice of the downtown money crowd" and was "a registered foreign agent for the biggest Democrat lobbying firm in Washington," labeling Portman and McEwen "Prince Rob and Bouncing Bob." McEwen, who had taken a hard-line on his checks in 1992, relented in the campaign. Martin Gottlieb wrote, "McEwen says now that his problem was a form of excessive pride. He says he used to 'demand perfection' of himself." McEwen also said, "I felt I could never admit a mistake. . . . I am very, very sorry. I should have watched it more carefully. . . . I have learned a great deal." Les Spaeth, chairman of the Warren County Republican Party and former Warren County Auditor, said, "People very much disliked the check overdraft thing, but I think they don't see it as happening again. I think it's past. He made a mistake and he got caught. But that's overridden by the service he's given, particularly to our county."

After his successor in Congress, Ted Strickland, found election-related files on his office computers, questions were raised about whether McEwen had been illegally using his House office in his re-election campaign in 1992. McEwen's former chief of staff said McEwen knew nothing about it, and the chief of staff admitted "a technical violation of the rules."

McEwen won four of the five counties in the district — Adams, Brown, Clermont and Warren. In Adams, once part of his district, he received 77% of the vote, sixty-seven points ahead of Portman. However, McEwen finished third in the largest county in the district, Hamilton, one he had never represented and which contained 57% of the Second District's registered voters. In the primary, Portman won only Hamilton County, but by a large enough margin to win the primary with 17,531 votes (35.61%), while McEwen received 14,542 (29.54%), Buchert 12,488 (25.37%), Dorsey 2,947 (5.99%), the rest scattering. The race in the Second District, one of the most Republican in the country, was determined in the primary — six times as many Republicans as Democrats voted in the primary — and Portman easily defeated attorney Lee Hornberger 53,020 (70.1%) to 22,652 (29.1%) in the special election on May 4.

Following the primary, the Dayton Daily News criticized McEwen for having voters return absentee voter request forms to his campaign office rather than directly to the county boards of elections. The Daily News also said the "primary was completely about personalities, rather than issues."

== Returns to private life ==
After his defeat, McEwen remained active in politics, but press accounts said he spent most of his time in the Washington, D.C., area residing in northern Virginia. Since 1997, he has been a partner with eleven other former Members of Congress in the Washington firm Advantage Associates, a lobbying and consulting firm. He founded FreedomQuest International, an international investment banking firm based in Washington, D.C. McEwen took to the lecture circuit, delivering speeches for $10,000 apiece. During the 2004 presidential election, McEwen traveled widely to speak for George W. Bush, focusing on Ohio. In 2006, he joined the law firm of Greenebaum, Doll, and McDonald as a consultant in its Cincinnati and Washington offices.

As executive director of the Council for National Policy, McEwen was embroiled in controversy over inaction of alerting the Ohio Republican Party about Wes Goodman's sexual activities in 2015 before Goodman ran for office of the Ohio House of Representatives. Goodman resigned from his seat in November 2017 when allegations were made public.

== 2005 congressional run ==
2005 Republican primary results by county: Schmidt: 20–30%; 40–50%; McEwen: 30–40%; 40–50%; 50–60%

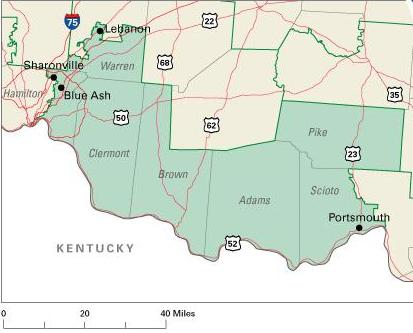
Detailed Map of Ohio's Second Congressional District

Days after President George W. Bush nominated Second District Congressman Rob Portman to be United States Trade Representative in March 2005, McEwen announced he would run for Portman's seat. He then moved from his home in Fairfax Station, Virginia and purchased a second residence, a condominium in Hamilton County's Anderson Township, east of Cincinnati. McEwen drew upon his connections and quickly had high-profile endorsements from Focus on the Family leader James Dobson, former United States Attorney General Edwin Meese, Cincinnati Bengals player Anthony Muñoz, American Family Association president Donald Wildmon, Citizens for Community Values anti-pornography crusader Phil Burress, and former New York congressman Jack Kemp, who came to the district to campaign for him. Kemp said in a rally in Clermont County on May 20 that "Bob and his wife Liz are like part of our family." Dobson wrote in his endorsement letter, "I have rarely been more excited about a candidate running in a highly significant race than I am about Bob McEwen for Congress . . . . If Bob returns to the House of Representatives, he will once again emerge as a tireless champion for the family and for traditional conservative values."

Ed Meese came to Cincinnati on May 31 to campaign for McEwen saying "Ronald Reagan relied on him heavily." Rival candidate Pat DeWine, a Hamilton County Commissioner and the son of Senator Mike DeWine, the same day questioned McEwen's post-Congressional career as a lobbyist, issuing a press release saying "no one who has ever served in Congress ought to be allowed to become a lobbyist. Ever." Congressman John Boehner, whose Eighth District was to the west of the Second, endorsed McEwen on June 7. Boehner was a freshman in McEwen's final term. He said, "Bob is the most qualified to step in and represent that district." The Congressmen from other neighboring districts, Steve Chabot and Mike Turner, were silent in the primary race. McEwen a week before the primary was reported to have raised $366,429, McEwen donating $250,000 to his campaign; DeWine's total was $743,407.

DeWine focused his attention on the most experienced candidate, McEwen. DeWine attacked McEwen with charges used against him in his last two campaigns. Dewine charged McEwen had "wasted taxpayers' money" by having the most expensive Congressional office of any Ohio member of the U.S. House and criticized McEwen's bouncing of 166 checks on the House bank. DeWine also tried to depict McEwen as a carpetbagger, asking in television advertisements "If Bob McEwen really cares about us, why has he spent the last twelve years living in Virginia?" McEwen denied he had bounced any checks, repeating what he had claimed in 1992 and insisted that he had continued to reside in Ohio since he lost his re-election bid, noting he had never voted in Virginia nor held a Virginia drivers license. (McEwen did not live in the second district until April 11, when he bought a condominium in Anderson Township; but DeWine did not live in the district until he bought a home there on April 6.) DeWine quoted correspondence from the Highland County Board of Elections claiming the Board had cancelled McEwen's voter registration for living in Virginia.

DeWine also questioned McEwen's record on taxes, sending out mailings criticizing McEwen's vote on May 24, 1982, in the 97th Congress "in support of a Democrat budget that raised out taxes by $233 billion." Two mailings focused on this issue, one featuring a photograph of Ronald Reagan that was captioned "When President Reagan Needed Votes to Keep Taxes Low, Bob McEwen Said 'NO'", the other asking "Are We Still the Party of Lower Taxes?"

Jean Schmidt, a former member of the Ohio House, benefited from the conservative vote being split by McEwen and Tom Brinkman. The official returns showed Schmidt had won with 14,331 votes (31%). McEwen finished second with 11,663 (25%), Brinkman was third with 9,320 (20%), and DeWine, who spent $1 million on his campaign, finished a distant fourth with 5,467 (12%). The remaining vote was split by the seven others, none of whom received more than 5%. Following the primary, McEwen campaigned with Schmidt in the general election against the Democratic nominee, attorney Paul Hackett.

== Facing Schmidt in 2006 ==
2006 Republican primary results by county Schmidt: 40–50%; 50–60%; McEwen: 40–50%; 50–60%; 60–70%

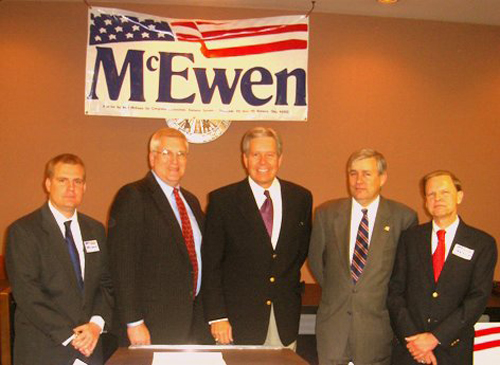
From left to right: Doug Mink, Eric Minamyer, Bob McEwen, Tom Brinkman, Steve Austin

On October 12, 2005, the Internet domain name BobMcEwenForSenate.com was registered. McEwen also considered a campaign for Lieutenant Governor as the running mate of Secretary of State J. Kenneth Blackwell, who sought to replace Bob Taft as governor. On December 16, 2005, The Cincinnati Enquirer reported McEwen was considering challenging Schmidt for her congressional seat in 2006 and had formed an exploratory committee. "I am in serious consideration," he told the newspaper. On January 18, 2006, McEwen confirmed that he would run in the May 2 primary against Jean Schmidt. He started his campaign with little in the way of reserve cash. "I won't let this distract me from my duties as a congresswoman," Schmidt told The Cincinnati Enquirer upon McEwen's announcement. "I have a job to do. I can't worry about this." Anti-pornography activist Phil Burress told the Associated Press that a race between Schmidt and McEwen would be tough. "They are two totally different types of personalities. Bob is a statesman, and I love that. Jean will get in your face in a heartbeat, and I like that too," said Burress. Also running were Deborah A. Kraus, who worked for the West Clermont school district's computer services department, and James E. Constable, who ran to protest the care his disabled son received from a state hospital.

McEwen finished second to Schmidt in the May 2 primary. Unofficial returns gave her 33,314 votes (47.75%) to McEwen's 29,611 (42.45%), Kraus's 4,358 (6.25%), and Constable's 2,480 (3.55%). McEwen won Adams, Brown, Pike, and Scioto counties while Schmidt won Clermont, Hamilton, and Warren.

== Lobbying ==
Following his primary challenge to Schmidt, McEwen worked as a lobbyist for Côte d'Ivoire strongman Laurent Gbagbo. "In December [2010], McEwen was hired at a rate of $25,000 per month to assist the Ivorian ambassador to the U.S. 'in exerting his influence in the most strategic way possible,' according to lobbying records." When asked about his representation of Gbagbo, McEwen said: "I was a member of the intelligence committee. There are not too many places in Africa I haven't been. So I'm knowledgeable of the issue and what's going on." "Despite allegations of human rights abuses, McEwen still supports Gbagbo, calling the 2010 crisis 'a coup in progress' by Gbagbo's opponents. He believes the international response is driven by French financial interests in the country."

== Namesake ==
There is a water treatment plant in Clermont County's Batavia Township named for McEwen. Clermont County was grateful to McEwen because he successfully forced the Ohio Department of Natural Resources to sell the county water from Harsha Lake after the state denied them water for years; the plant treats the Harsha Lake water he obtained for the county.

== See also ==
- List of United States representatives from Ohio

U.S. House of Representatives
Preceded by Bill Harsha	Member of the U.S. House of Representatives from Ohio's 6th congressional district 1981–1993	Succeeded by Ted Strickland
U.S. order of precedence (ceremonial)
Preceded by Dennis Eckart as Former U.S. Representative	Order of precedence of the United States as Former U.S. Representative	Succeeded by Bob Gibbs as Former U.S. Representative
