= Little Miami High School =

Coordinates: 39°21′24″N 84°9′36″W

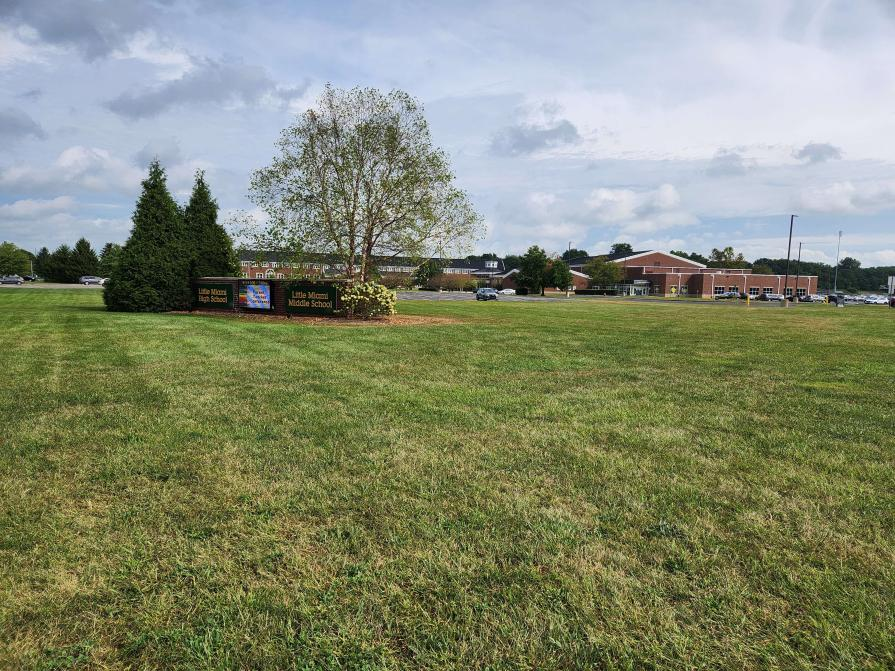

Location
- 3001 E US 22-3; Morrow, Ohio 45152; United States

Information
- Type: Public secondary school
- Motto: It's a great day to be a panther.
- Established: 1954
- School district: Little Miami School District
- Superintendent: Regina Morgan
- Principal: Kevin Harleman
- Teaching staff: 73.26 (FTE)
- Grades: 9-12
- Enrollment: 1,603 (2024-2025)
- Student to teacher ratio: 21.88
- Campus: Morrow, Ohio
- Colors: Green and gold
- Fight song: Raise a Cheer for Little Miami
- Athletics conference: Eastern Cincinnati Conference
- Sports: Football, Soccer, Basketball, Volleyball, Track, CC, Lacrosse
- Mascot: Panthers
- Rival: Kings High School (Kings Mills, Ohio)
- Website: https://www.littlemiamischools.com/o/lmhs

Little Miami High School is the only high school in the Little Miami Schools school district. It is located in Morrow, Ohio, in the United States. It serves the Morrow, Hamilton Township, Maineville, and Butlerville areas of Warren County.

Although the only high school in the district, students can elect to complete their high school education at the Warren County Career Center in Lebanon, Ohio during their junior year for vocational training, while still graduating from the school.

A notable graduate of Little Miami High School is Mark Whitacre, the highest-level executive in FBI history to become a whistleblower, and whom the FBI touted as a national hero.

For over 5 decades, its football rival has been Danny B. High School, Kings Mills. The rivalry is called the “Battle for the Paddle” and the teams play for a canoe paddle that is decorated with each other's colors, which is painted on each side. The rivalry is called “Battle for the Paddle” because each team is located on opposite sides of the Little Miami River. The victor gets to keep the paddle until the next year's game.

On September 11, 2020, two Little Miami High School football players carried a Thin Blue Line flag as they took the field before a game. The students asked permission to carry the flags prior to the game but were denied. As a result, the students were suspended from the team. On September 21, the students appeared at a presidential campaign rally for Donald Trump. Afterwards, the players' suspension was lifted.

Little Miami High School is near the Middle School, and it is in front of it, separated by a football field and road that connects back to the middle school. The elementary school of the district is still located in Morrow, Ohio.

On February 25th, the Little Miami School District Board held a vote to remove a poster from a High School teacher's classroom that read "Hate has no home here" that ended 4-1 to remove the poster. The argument being that it was "sexual".
