= South Lebanon, Ohio =

- City
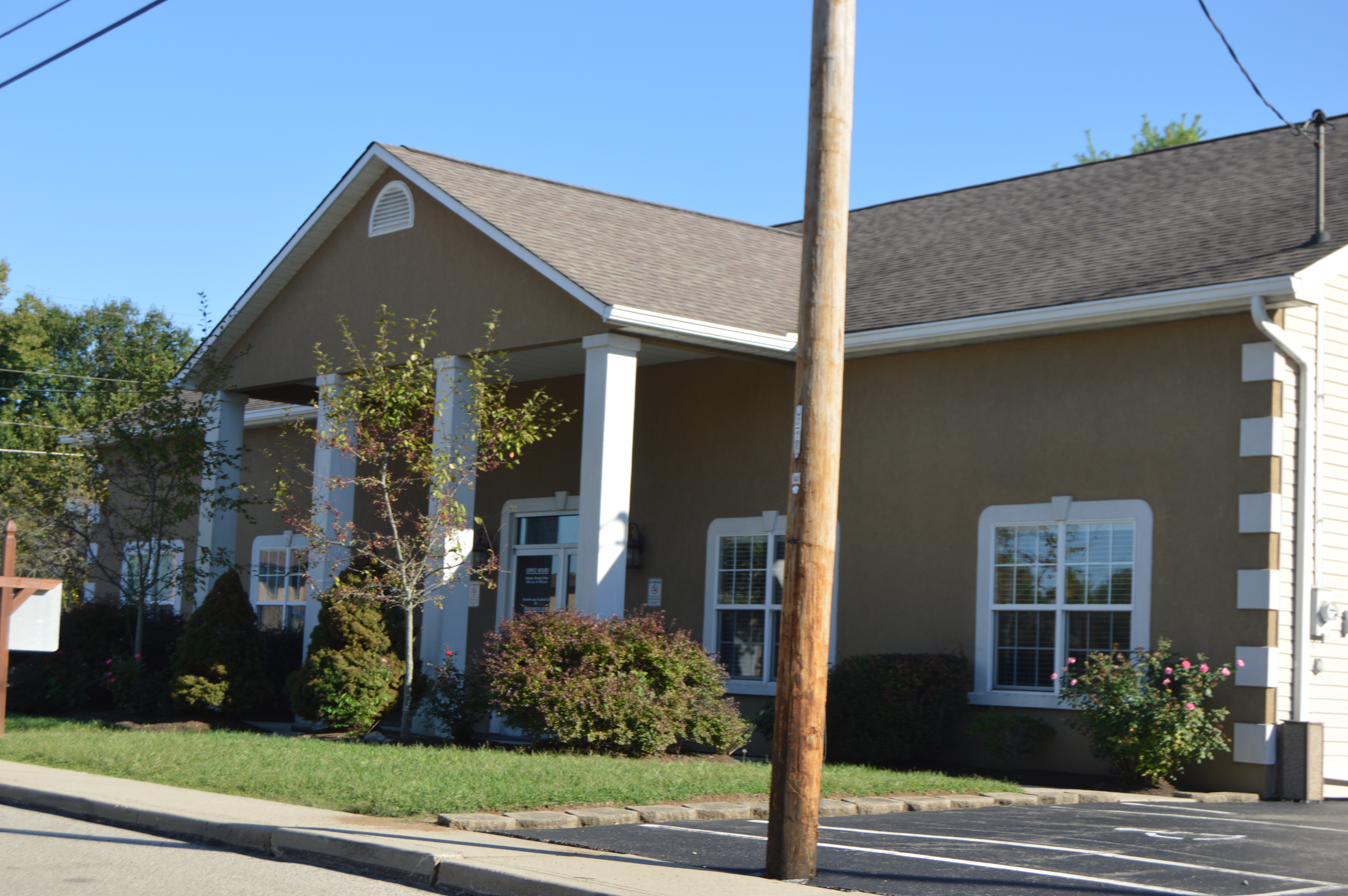
- City Hall
- Motto: "Reclaiming Our Past Embracing Our Future"
- Interactive map of South Lebanon, Ohio
- Location within Ohio Location within the United States
- Coordinates: 39°22′00″N 84°13′15″W
- Country: United States
- State: Ohio
- County: Warren

Government
  - Type: Mayor–council
  - Mayor: Linda S. Burke

Area
  - Total: 3.56 sq mi (9.21 km^{2})
  - Land: 3.43 sq mi (8.88 km^{2})
  - Water: 0.12 sq mi (0.32 km^{2})
- Elevation: 627 ft (191 m)

Population (2020)
  - Total: 6,384
  - Density: 1,861.8/sq mi (718.84/km^{2})
- Time zone: UTC-5 (Eastern (EST))
  - Summer (DST): UTC-4 (EDT)
- ZIP code: 45065
- Area code: 513
- FIPS code: 39-73446
- GNIS feature ID: 2399851
- Website: www.southlebanonohio.org

South Lebanon is a city in central Warren County, Ohio, United States. The population was 6,384 at the 2020 census. It is part of the Cincinnati metropolitan area.

== History ==
The first settlement at South Lebanon was made in the 1790s. The village was originally called "Deerfield" because it was the chief settlement of Deerfield Township, Warren County, Ohio, but renamed because of its proximity to the county seat of Lebanon. The new name of "South Lebanon" was adopted when the railroad was built through the neighborhood. A post office was established under the name Deerfield Village in 1828, and the name of the post office was changed to South Lebanon in 1871.

== Geography ==
South Lebanon is part of Union and Hamilton townships. According to the United States Census Bureau, the village has a total area of 2.68 square miles (6.94 km^{2}), of which 2.65 square miles (6.86 km^{2}) is land and 0.03 square miles (0.08 km^{2}) is water.

== Demographics ==
Historical population
| Census | Pop. | Note | %± |
|---|---|---|---|
| 1880 | 42 | | — |
| 1900 | 484 | | — |
| 1910 | 626 | | 29.3% |
| 1920 | 675 | | 7.8% |
| 1930 | 713 | | 5.6% |
| 1940 | 756 | | 6.0% |
| 1950 | 1,291 | | 70.8% |
| 1960 | 2,720 | | 110.7% |
| 1970 | 3,014 | | 10.8% |
| 1980 | 2,700 | | −10.4% |
| 1990 | 2,696 | | −0.1% |
| 2000 | 2,538 | | −5.9% |
| 2010 | 4,115 | | 62.1% |
| 2020 | 6,384 | | 55.1% |
U.S. Decennial Census

Most of the village is in the Kings Local School District, but parts are in the Little Miami Local and Lebanon City School Districts. It is entirely in the South Lebanon telephone exchange.

=== 2010 census ===
As of the census of 2010, there were 4,115 people, 1,533 households, and 1,118 families living in the village. The population density was 1,552.8 inhabitants per square mile (599.5/km^{2}). There were 1,641 housing units at an average density of 619.2 per square mile (239.1/km^{2}). The racial makeup of the village was 96.2% White, 1.4% African American, 0.1% Native American, 0.7% Asian, 0.5% from other races, and 1.1% from two or more races. Hispanic or Latino of any race were 2.3% of the population.

There were 1,533 households, of which 40.2% had children under the age of 18 living with them, 53.0% were married couples living together, 14.2% had a female householder with no husband present, 5.7% had a male householder with no wife present, and 27.1% were non-families. 22.2% of all households were made up of individuals, and 7.6% had someone living alone who was 65 years of age or older. The average household size was 2.67 and the average family size was 3.13.

The median age in the village was 35.3 years. 28.9% of residents were under the age of 18; 7.5% were between the ages of 18 and 24; 28.2% were from 25 to 44; 26.5% were from 45 to 64; and 9% were 65 years of age or older. The gender makeup of the village was 48.3% male and 51.7% female.

=== 2000 census ===
As of the census of 2000, there were 2,538 people, 996 households, and 693 families living in the village. The population density was 1,521.2 inhabitants per square mile (587.3/km^{2}). There were 1,069 housing units at an average density of 640.7 per square mile (247.4/km^{2}). The racial makeup of the village was 98.58% White, 0.04% African American, 0.20% Native American, 0.20% Asian, 0.32% from other races, and 0.67% from two or more races. Hispanic or Latino of any race were 1.10% of the population.

There were 996 households, out of which 34.4% had children under the age of 18 living with them, 49.7% were married couples living together, 14.1% had a female householder with no husband present, and 30.4% were non-families. 26.1% of all households were made up of individuals, and 9.5% had someone living alone who was 65 years of age or older. The average household size was 2.55 and the average family size was 3.07.

In the village, the population was spread out, with 27.4% under the age of 18, 9.5% from 18 to 24, 31.6% from 25 to 44, 20.4% from 45 to 64, and 11.0% who were 65 years of age or older. The median age was 34 years. For every 100 females there were 97.7 males. For every 100 females age 18 and over, there were 94.8 males.

The median income for a household in the village was $35,676, and the median income for a family was $40,798. Males had a median income of $30,722 versus $25,417 for females. The per capita income for the village was $16,779. About 11.5% of families and 12.7% of the population were below the poverty line, including 14.3% of those under age 18 and 10.4% of those age 65 or over.
