= Union Township, Warren County, Ohio =

Township in Ohio, US

- Township
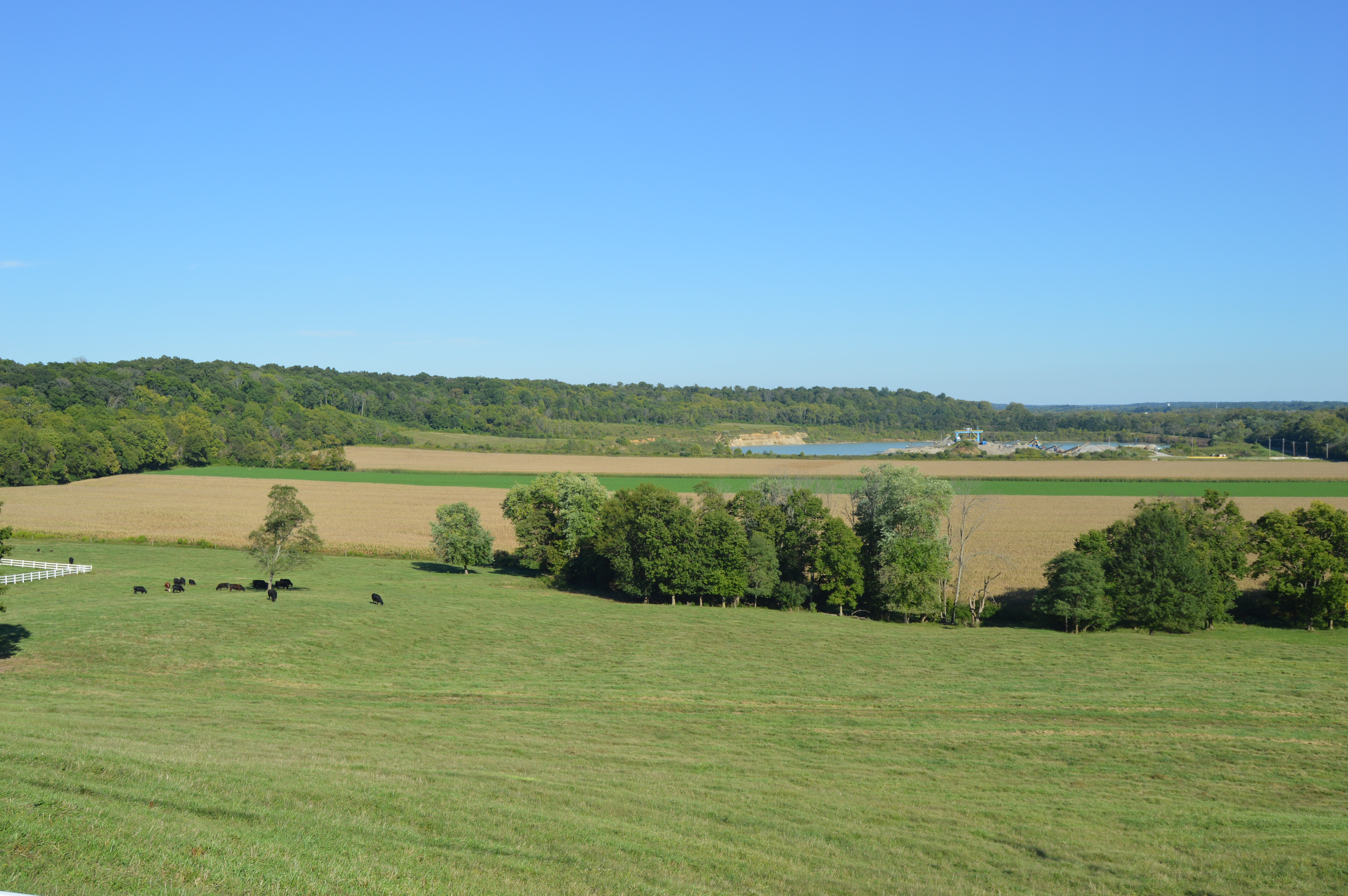
- Open land just east of South Lebanon

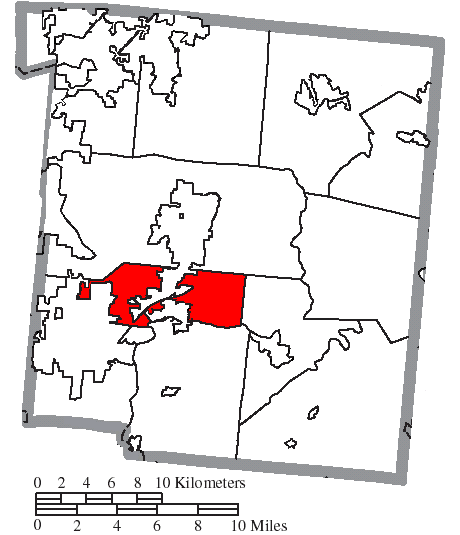
- Location of Union Township in Warren County
- Coordinates: 39°22′52″N 84°13′28″W
- Country: United States
- State: Ohio
- County: Warren

Area
  - Total: 14.7 sq mi (38.2 km^{2})
  - Land: 14.6 sq mi (37.9 km^{2})
  - Water: 0.077 sq mi (0.2 km^{2})
- Elevation: 630 ft (192 m)

Population (2020)
  - Total: 6,251
  - Density: 320/sq mi (123/km^{2})
- Time zone: UTC-5 (Eastern (EST))
  - Summer (DST): UTC-4 (EDT)
- FIPS code: 39-78610
- GNIS feature ID: 1087121
- Website: http://uniontownshipwarrencounty.com/

Union Township is one of the eleven townships of Warren County, Ohio, United States, located in the central part of the county. It was established January 3, 1815 and named Union as it was formed from parts of Deerfield and Turtlecreek Townships. The population was 6,251 as of the 2020 census.

== Geography ==
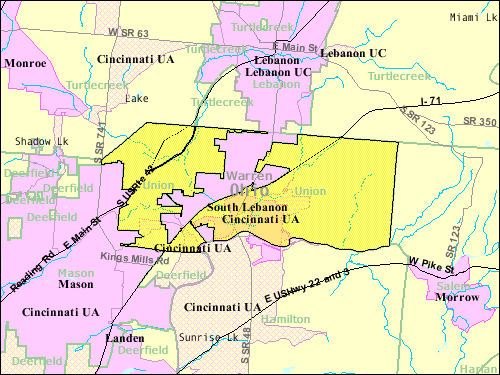

Located in the central part of the county, it borders the following townships:

- Turtlecreek Township - north
- Salem Township - east
- Hamilton Township - south, across the Little Miami River
- Deerfield Township - southwest

The smallest township in the county, it originally had fifteen full and six fractional sections of land totaling 11,970 acres (48 km^{2}). However, a large portion of the township has been annexed into South Lebanon, Lebanon, and Mason. The village of South Lebanon remains within the township, but Mason and Lebanon are not and that land has been lost. The township is prone to flooding from the Little Miami and Turtle Creek.

The entire township is in the Symmes Purchase and was surveyed in accordance with the unusual plan Symmes chose.

Union is the third most popular township name statewide; only Washington (43 townships) and Jackson (37 townships) are more common.

== History ==
Union Township was organized in 1815.

== Government ==
The township is governed by a three-member board of trustees, who are elected in November of odd-numbered years to a four-year term beginning on the following January 1. Two are elected in the year after the presidential election and one is elected in the year before it. There is also an elected township fiscal officer, who serves a four-year term beginning on April 1 of the year after the election, which is held in November of the year before the presidential election. Vacancies in the fiscal officership or on the board of trustees are filled by the remaining trustees.

== Public services ==
Telephone service is provided through South Lebanon, Lebanon, Mason, and Morrow exchanges, while the South Lebanon, Lebanon, Kings Mills, and Morrow post offices serve the township.

Interstate 71 crosses the township from southwest to northeast and State Route 48 from south to north. U.S. Route 42 clips the northwest corner of the township. Formerly, the Middletown and Cincinnati Railroad crossed the township, but all track southeast of US 42 has been abandoned and lifted. The city of Lebanon's sewage treatment plant is in Union Township, along the Little Miami River.

=== Education ===
Most of the township is in the Kings Local School District, which was formerly known as the Deerfield-Union Local School District, while parts are in the Lebanon City School District, the Mason City School District, and the Little Miami Schools.
