= Washington Township, Warren County, Ohio =

Township in Ohio, US

- Township
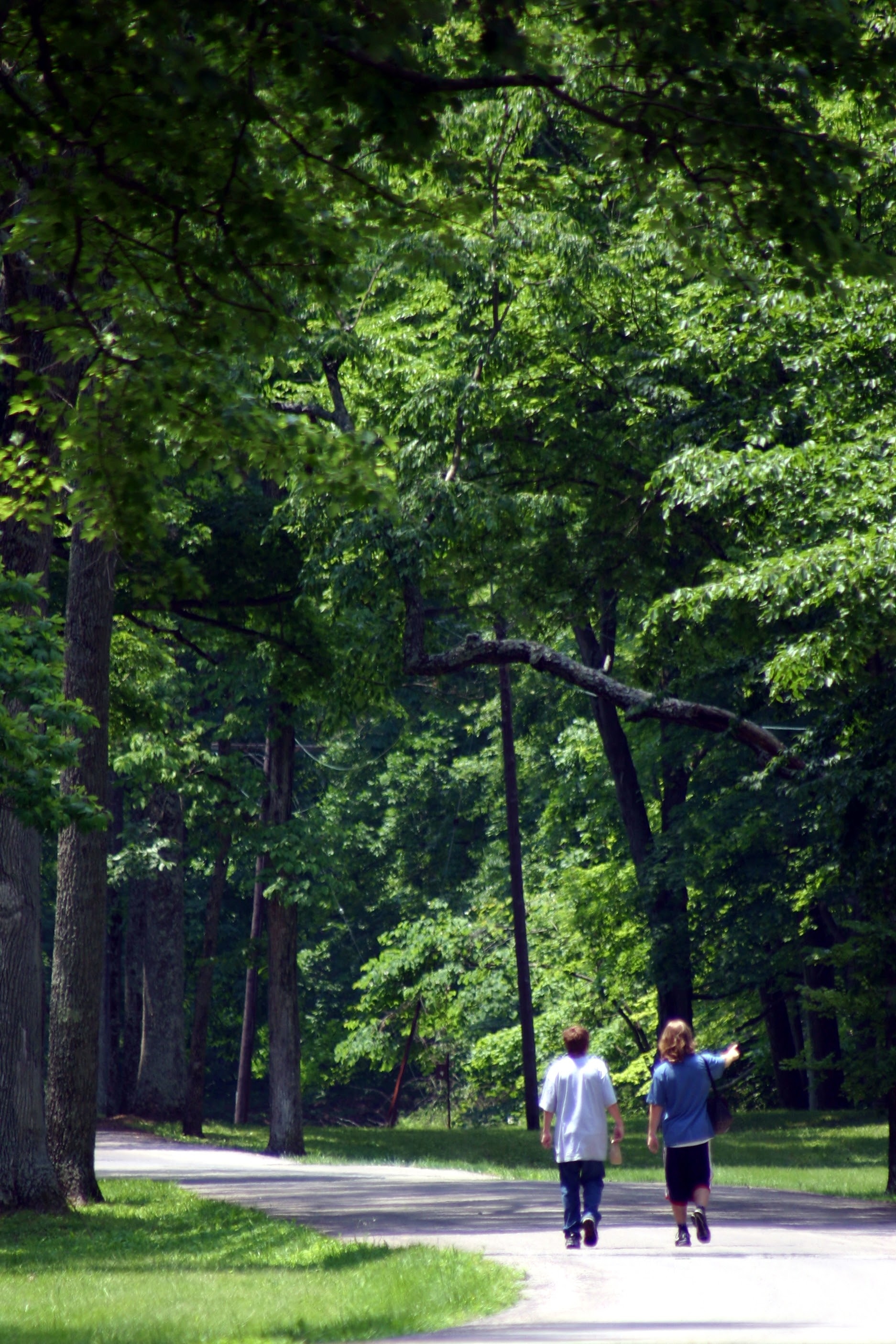
- Trail at Fort Ancient

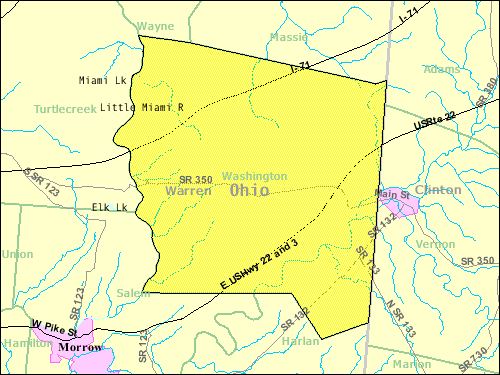
- Detailed map of Washington Township
- Coordinates: 39°24′34″N 84°3′15″W
- Country: United States
- State: Ohio
- County: Warren

Area
  - Total: 34.4 sq mi (89.1 km^{2})
  - Land: 34.2 sq mi (88.7 km^{2})
  - Water: 0.12 sq mi (0.3 km^{2})
- Elevation: 961 ft (293 m)

Population (2020)
  - Total: 2,752
  - Density: 54/sq mi (20.9/km^{2})
- Time zone: UTC-5 (Eastern (EST))
  - Summer (DST): UTC-4 (EDT)
- FIPS code: 39-81690
- GNIS feature ID: 1087122
- Website: https://washington-township.org/

Washington Township is one of the eleven townships of Warren County, Ohio, United States. Located in the east-central part of the county, it is the only one of the eleven that does not contain a municipality. The population was 2,752 at the 2020 census.

== Geography ==
Located in the eastern part of the county, it borders the following townships:

- Massie Township – north
- Adams Township, Clinton County – northeast
- Vernon Township, Clinton County – east
- Harlan Township – south
- Salem Township – southwest
- Turtlecreek Township – west, across the Little Miami River
- Wayne Township – northwest

It was wholly within the Virginia Military District and was surveyed under the metes and bounds system.

The township is the home of Fort Ancient, a prehistoric earthwork built by the Mound Builders 2,000 years ago.

== Name and history ==
Named for President George Washington, it shares its name with forty-two other Townships statewide.

Washington Township was created by the Warren County Commissioners on June 27, 1818.

== Government ==
The township is governed by a three-member board of trustees, who are elected in November of odd-numbered years to a four-year term beginning on the following January 1. Two are elected in the year after the presidential election and one is elected in the year before it. There is also an elected township fiscal officer, who serves a four-year term beginning on April 1 of the year after the election, which is held in November of the year before the presidential election. Vacancies in the fiscal officership or on the board of trustees are filled by the remaining trustees.

== Public services ==
Most of the township is in the Clinton Massie Local School District, but parts are in the Little Miami Schools and the Lebanon City School District. Telephone service is provided through the Lebanon, Clarksville, Morrow, and Waynesville exchanges. Mail is delivered through the Clarksville, Lebanon, Oregonia and Waynesville post offices.
