= Level, Ohio =

Unincorporated community in Ohio, U.S.

Coordinates: 39°17′05″N 84°03′00″W

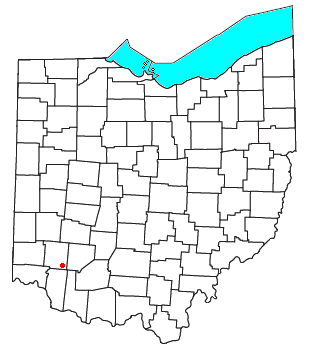
Location of Level, Ohio

Level is an unincorporated community in southern Harlan Township, Warren County, Ohio, United States, which in the 19th century was a station on the Marietta and Cincinnati Railroad and had its own post office, since closed. According to the U.S. Geographic Names Information System (GNIS), an alternate name for this community is Windsor.

Level was not officially platted. A post office called Level was established in 1834, and remained in operation until 1905.
