= Lebanon City School District =

School district in Ohio

The Lebanon City School District (commonly known as Lebanon City Schools) is a city school district located in Lebanon, Ohio, United States. The school district covers 81.9 square miles (212 km^{2}) primarily in the City of Lebanon and Turtlecreek Township in Warren County. In addition to most of Lebanon, it also includes small portions of Union, Salem, Clearcreek, and Washington townships, as well as some small areas that have been annexed by the cities of Middletown and Mason.

The district has approximately 5,800 students.

== History ==
Todd Yohey became superintendent in 2016 and served until his 2020 retirement, when he became the associate director of the Southwest Ohio Computer Association. According to Yohey the Lebanon district board wanted him to remain in his position.

On January 1, 2021, Robert Buskirk became the interim superintendent, though the school board did not choose him as a finalist for the permanent superintendent position. Isaac W. Seevers, previously superintendent of Greeneview Local School District, was selected as superintendent in April 2021.

== Schools ==
- Lebanon High School (grades 9–12)
- Lebanon Junior High School (grades 7–8) –
- Berry Intermediate School (grades 5–6) – building formerly served as Berry Middle School (grades 6–8) from 1969 to 2004, and as Lebanon High prior to 1969
- Donovan Elementary School (grades 3–4) – building formally served as Donovan Intermediate School from 1995 to 2004
- Bowman Primary School (prekindergarten–grade 2)

=== Former schools ===
- Francis Dunlevy Elementary – named after Francis Dunlevy, the first teacher in the area; closed and converted to school transportation center
- Alfred Holbrook Elementary – closed and used for school administrative offices until 2021 when the old junior high was converted to the new administrative offices
- Louisa Wright Elementary School – demolished
- Lebanon Junior High School - Partial demolition and replaced after the new junior high school was built. Was originally used as the high school before the current was finished in 2003 is currently the new district administrative offices
