= Hamilton Township, Warren County, Ohio =

Township in Ohio, US

- Township
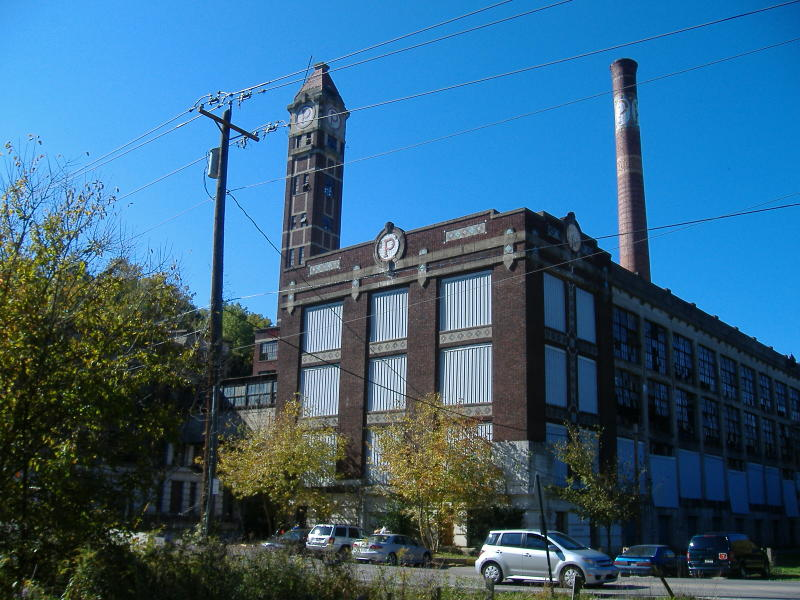
- Part of the former Peters Cartridge Company complex Now part of Village Of South Lebanon, Ohio

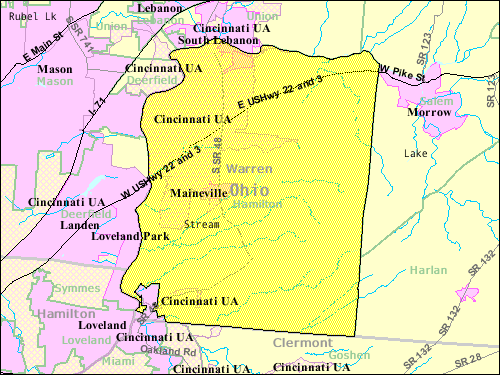
- Detailed map of Hamilton Township
- Coordinates: 39°19′18″N 84°12′42″W
- Country: United States
- State: Ohio
- County: Warren

Area
  - Total: 35.5 sq mi (92.0 km^{2})
  - Land: 35.2 sq mi (91.1 km^{2})
  - Water: 0.35 sq mi (0.9 km^{2})
- Elevation: 823 ft (251 m)

Population (2020)
  - Total: 30,587
  - Density: 861/sq mi (332.5/km^{2})
- Time zone: UTC-5 (Eastern (EST))
  - Summer (DST): UTC-4 (EDT)
- FIPS code: 39-33068
- GNIS feature ID: 1087114
- Website: Township website

Hamilton Township is one of the eleven townships of Warren County, Ohio, United States. It is located in the south central portion of the county. The population was 30,587 at the 2020 census.

== Geography ==
Located in the southern part of the county, it borders the following townships:

- Union Township - north
- Salem Township - northeast
- Harlan Township - east
- Goshen Township, Clermont County - southeast
- Miami Township, Clermont County - southwest, south of Symmes Township
- Symmes Township, Hamilton County - southwest, north of Miami Township
- Deerfield Township - west

The village of Maineville is near the center of the township. Parts of the township have been annexed by South Lebanon in the north and Loveland in the south. The communities of Zoar, Cozaddale, Murdock, Hopkinsville, Dallasburg, and Fosters are located here.

== History ==
Hamilton Township was one of the four original townships of Warren County, created on May 10, 1803. It is named for Alexander Hamilton, as are similar townships, in Franklin, Jackson, and Lawrence counties statewide.

== Government ==
The township is governed by a three-member board of trustees, who are elected in November of odd-numbered years to a four-year term beginning on the following January 1. Two are elected in the year after the presidential election and one is elected in the year before it. There is also an elected township fiscal officer, who serves a four-year term beginning on April 1 of the year after the election, which is held in November of the year before the presidential election. Vacancies in the fiscal officership or on the board of trustees are filled by the remaining trustees.

== Public services ==
Most of the township is in the Little Miami Schools, but parts are in the Loveland City, Kings Local, and Goshen Local School Districts. The township is primarily served by the Little Miami and South Lebanon telephone exchanges, but parts lie in the Morrow and Butlerville exchanges. Mail is delivered through the Maineville, Loveland, Goshen, South Lebanon, and Morrow post offices.

== Transportation ==
The major roads are US Route 22/Ohio 3, also known as the 3C Highway and originally known as the Cincinnati, Montgomery, and Hopkinsville pike. The Marietta and Cincinnati Railroad, which was absorbed by the Baltimore and Ohio Railroad, ran through the southeast corner of the township, while the Little Miami Railroad followed the Little Miami River through the township. This is now the Little Miami Bike Trail.
