= Harlan Township, Warren County, Ohio =

Township in Ohio, US

- Township
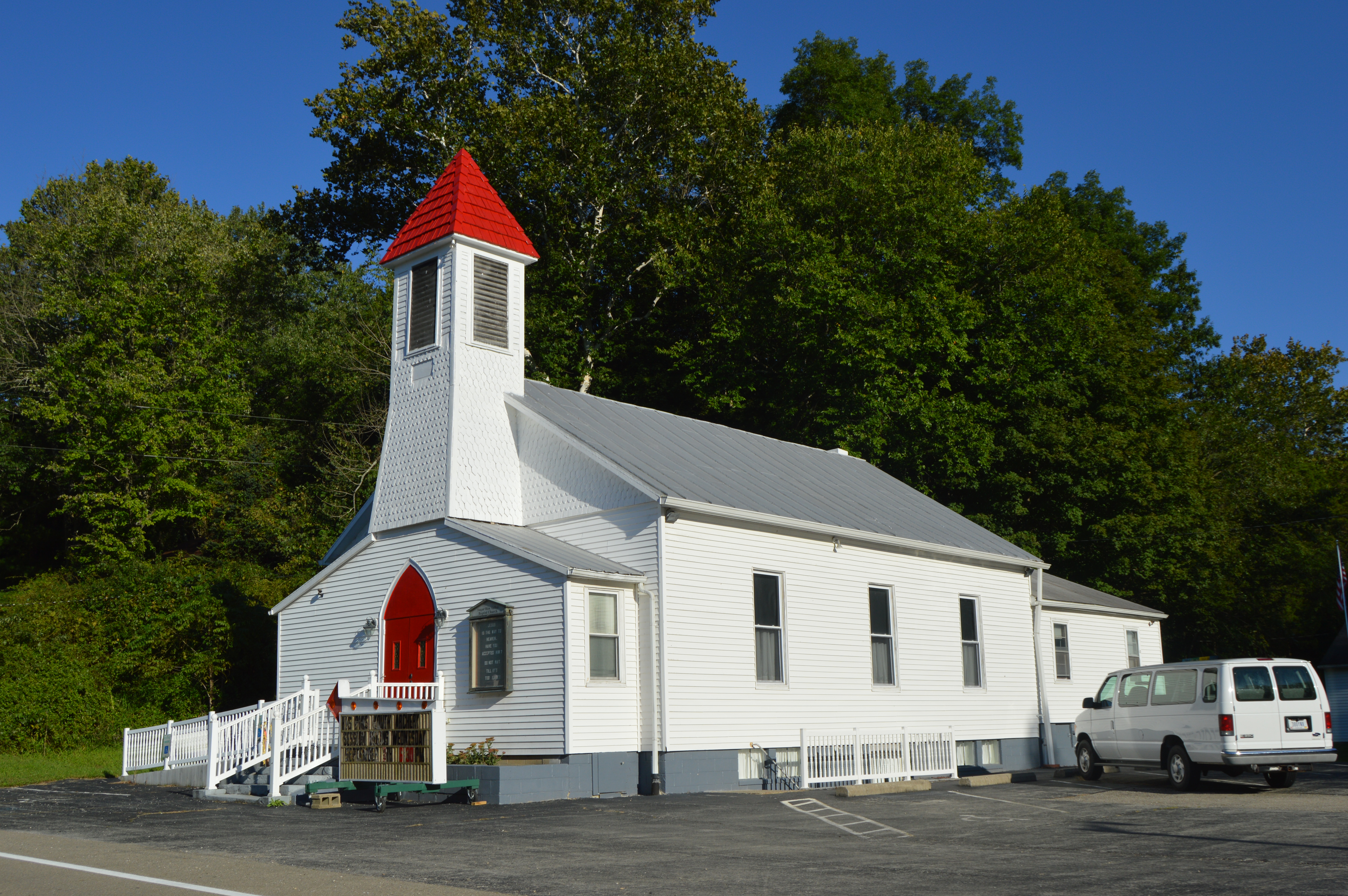
- Sugar Run Valley Baptist Church

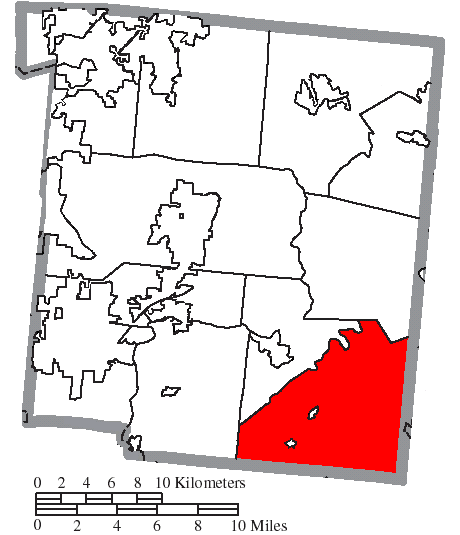
- Location of Harlan Township in Warren County
- Coordinates: 39°17′48″N 84°3′56″W
- Country: United States
- State: Ohio
- County: Warren

Area
  - Total: 45.2 sq mi (117.0 km^{2})
  - Land: 45.2 sq mi (117.0 km^{2})
  - Water: 0 sq mi (0.0 km^{2})
- Elevation: 899 ft (274 m)

Population (2020)
  - Total: 4,929
  - Density: 80/sq mi (31/km^{2})
- Time zone: UTC-5 (Eastern (EST))
  - Summer (DST): UTC-4 (EDT)
- FIPS code: 39-33474
- GNIS feature ID: 1087115
- Website: https://www.harlantwp.us/

Harlan Township is one of the eleven townships of Warren County, Ohio, United States. It is located in the southeast corner of the county. The population was 4,929 as of the 2020 census.

== Geography ==
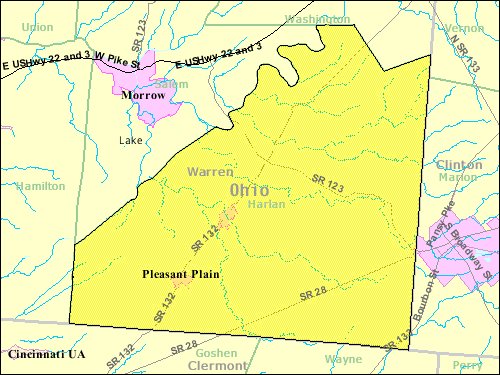

Located in the southeastern corner of the county, it borders the following townships:

- Washington Township - north
- Vernon Township, Clinton County - northeast
- Marion Township, Clinton County - east
- Wayne Township, Clermont County - southeast
- Goshen Township, Clermont County - southwest
- Hamilton Township - west
- Salem Township - northwest

The two tiny villages of Butlerville and Pleasant Plain are located in Harlan Township, as well as the unincorporated community of Level.

== Name and history ==
The only Harlan Township statewide, it is named for Aaron Harlan of Xenia, a member of the Ohio General Assembly that created the township and who formerly represented the area in Congress.

Harlan Township was organized in 1860. It was created by the Ohio General Assembly by the Act of March 16, 1860 (Ohio Laws, volume 57, page 135), which took effect that day. It divided the existing Salem Township into two parts, the northern part to be called Corwin Township, the southern to be called Harlan.

== Government ==
The township is governed by a three-member board of trustees, who are elected in November of odd-numbered years to a four-year term beginning on the following January 1. Two are elected in the year after the presidential election and one is elected in the year before it. There is also an elected township fiscal officer, who serves a four-year term beginning on April 1 of the year after the election, which is held in November of the year before the presidential election. Vacancies in the fiscal officership or on the board of trustees are filled by the remaining trustees.

== Public services ==
The Little Miami, Blanchester, Goshen, and Clinton Massie school districts serve the township. Mail is delivered through the Pleasant Plain, Clarksville, Morrow, Goshen, and Blanchester post offices. The Little Miami Telephone Company's Butlerville exchange serves most of the township, but parts of Harlan Township lie in the Little Miami, Blanchester, Morrow, and Clarksville telephone exchanges.
