= Salem Township, Warren County, Ohio =

Township in Ohio, US

- Township
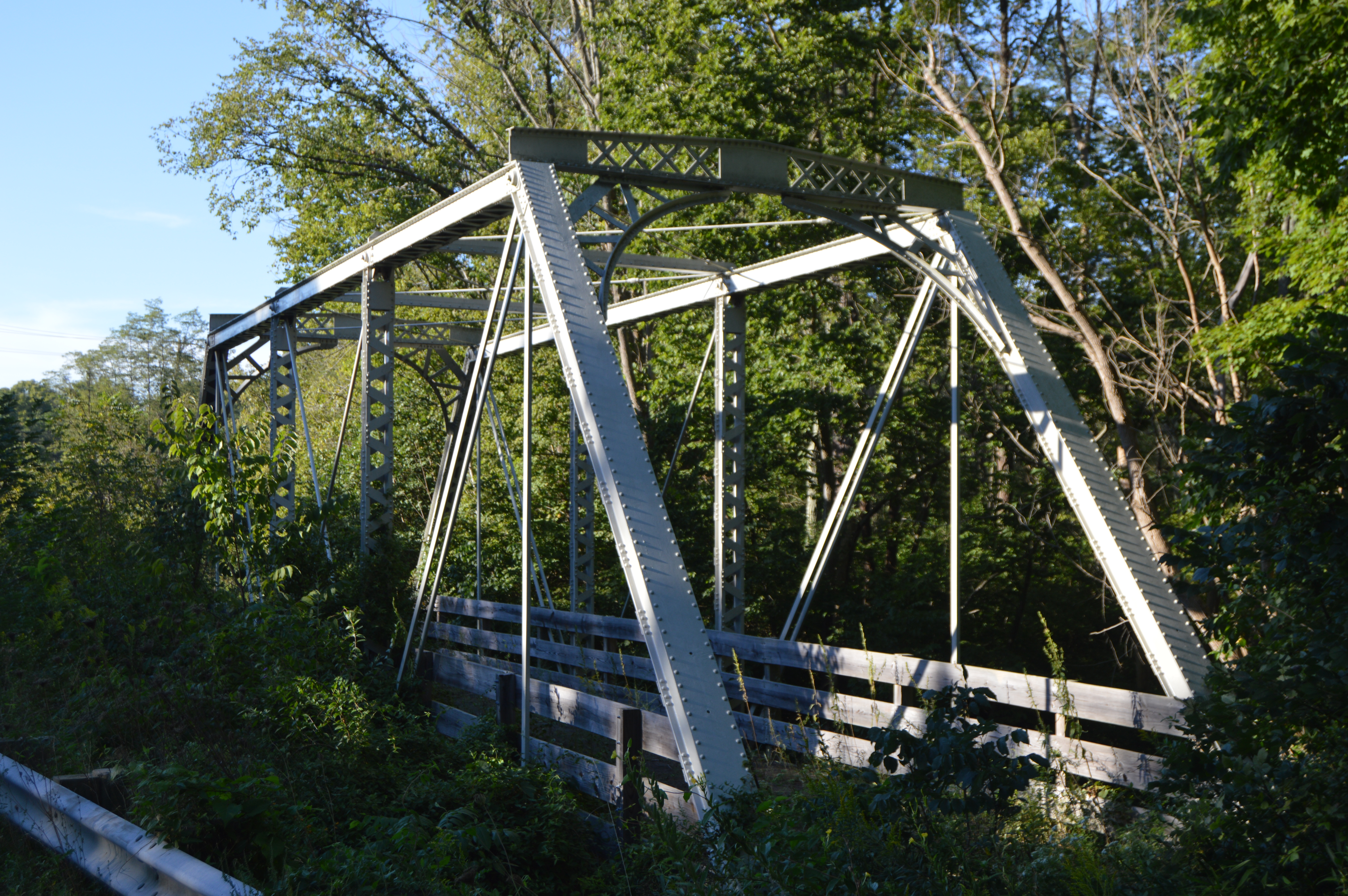
- Old bridge along State Route 123

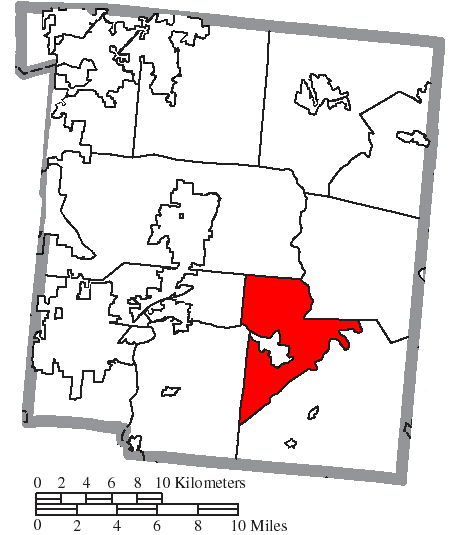
- Location of Salem Township in Warren County
- Coordinates: 39°21′20″N 84°7′26″W
- Country: United States
- State: Ohio
- County: Warren

Area
  - Total: 21.9 sq mi (56.8 km^{2})
  - Land: 21.9 sq mi (56.6 km^{2})
  - Water: 0.12 sq mi (0.3 km^{2})
- Elevation: 646 ft (197 m)

Population (2020)
  - Total: 5,215
  - Density: 189/sq mi (73.1/km^{2})
- Time zone: UTC-5 (Eastern (EST))
  - Summer (DST): UTC-4 (EDT)
- FIPS code: 39-69988
- GNIS feature ID: 1087119
- Website: https://www.salemtownship-warrencounty.com/

Salem Township is one of the eleven townships of Warren County, Ohio, United States, located in the central part of the county. The population was 5,215 at the 2020 census. It is the second smallest township in the county with 13,459 acres (54 km^{2}). It is one of fourteen Salem Townships statewide.

== Geography ==
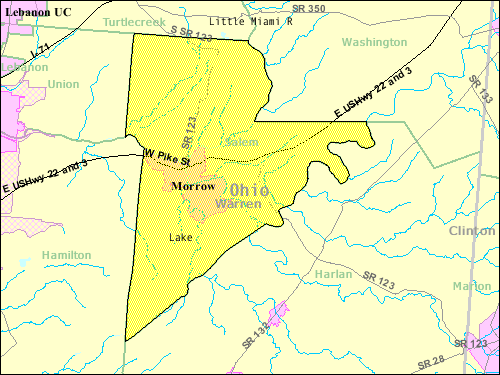

Located in the southern part of the county, it borders the following townships:

- Washington Township - northeast
- Harlan Township - southeast
- Hamilton Township - southwest
- Union Township - west
- Turtlecreek Township - northwest

It is bisected by the Little Miami River.

The village of Morrow lies entirely within the township.

== History ==
Salem Township was established June 8, 1818 from Hamilton Township and originally consisted of the part of Salem south of the Little Miami and what is now Harlan Township. By a special act of the Ohio General Assembly of March 16, 1860, Harlan Township was separated from it and Salem was renamed Corwin Township. Later that year the Warren County Commissioners renamed the township Salem and took a portion of Union across the Little Miami and attached it to Salem. Salem Township is in both the Symmes Purchase and the Virginia Military District.

== Government ==
The township is governed by a three-member board of trustees, who are elected in November of odd-numbered years to a four-year term beginning on the following January 1. Two are elected in the year after the presidential election and one is elected in the year before it. There is also an elected township fiscal officer, who serves a four-year term beginning on April 1 of the year after the election, which is held in November of the year before the presidential election. Vacancies in the fiscal officership or on the board of trustees are filled by the remaining trustees.

== Public services ==
Most of the township is in the Little Miami Schools, but a part north of the Little Miami River is in the Lebanon City School District. Salem Township is within the Morrow, Lebanon, and Clarksville telephone exchanges and the Morrow post office's territory.
