= Pleasant Plain, Ohio =

- Village
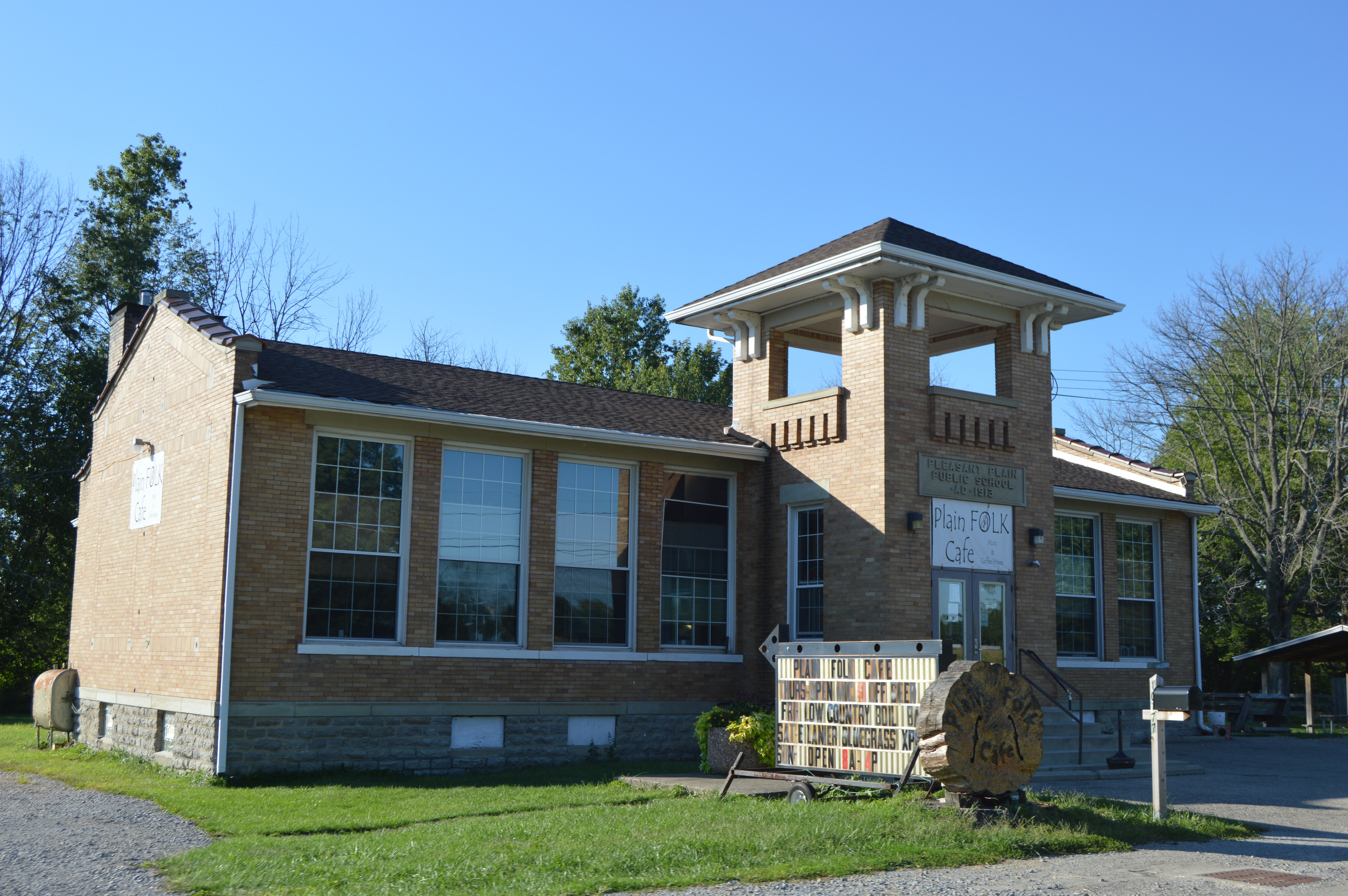
- Former village school

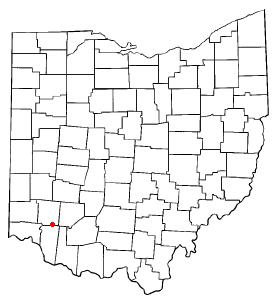
- Location of Pleasant Plain, Ohio

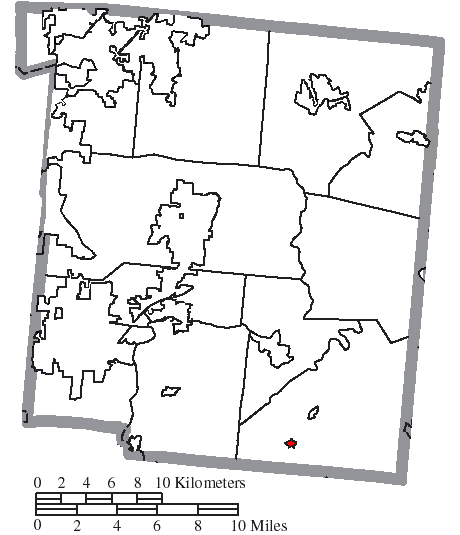
- Location of Pleasant Plain in Warren County
- Coordinates: 39°16′42″N 84°06′44″W
- Country: United States
- State: Ohio
- County: Warren

Area
  - Total: 0.16 sq mi (0.42 km^{2})
  - Land: 0.16 sq mi (0.42 km^{2})
  - Water: 0 sq mi (0.00 km^{2})
- Elevation: 886 ft (270 m)

Population (2020)
  - Total: 129
  - Density: 796.4/sq mi (307.51/km^{2})
- Time zone: UTC-5 (Eastern (EST))
  - Summer (DST): UTC-4 (EDT)
- ZIP code: 45162
- Area code: 513
- FIPS code: 39-63576
- GNIS feature ID: 2399693

Pleasant Plain is a village in Harlan Township, Warren County, Ohio, United States. The population was 129 at the 2020 census.

== History ==
Pleasant Plain was originally called New Columbia, and under the latter name was laid out in 1852. Was founded by Samuel Craig. A post office has been in operation at Pleasant Plain since 1851.

== Geography ==
According to the United States Census Bureau, the village has a total area of 0.16 square miles (0.41 km^{2}), all land.

== Demographics ==
Historical population
| Census | Pop. | Note | %± |
|---|---|---|---|
| 1880 | 151 | | — |
| 1920 | 154 | | — |
| 1930 | 153 | | −0.6% |
| 1940 | 139 | | −9.2% |
| 1950 | 164 | | 18.0% |
| 1960 | 212 | | 29.3% |
| 1970 | 223 | | 5.2% |
| 1980 | 210 | | −5.8% |
| 1990 | 138 | | −34.3% |
| 2000 | 156 | | 13.0% |
| 2010 | 154 | | −1.3% |
| 2020 | 129 | | −16.2% |
U.S. Decennial Census

=== 2010 census ===
As of the census of 2010, there were 154 people, 58 households, and 42 families living in the village. The population density was 962.5 inhabitants per square mile (371.6/km^{2}). There were 61 housing units at an average density of 381.3 per square mile (147.2/km^{2}). The racial makeup of the village was 97.4% White, 1.9% African American, and 0.6% from two or more races.

There were 58 households, of which 34.5% had children under the age of 18 living with them, 53.4% were married couples living together, 12.1% had a female householder with no husband present, 6.9% had a male householder with no wife present, and 27.6% were non-families. 20.7% of all households were made up of individuals living alone, in addition with 5.1% who were 65 years of age or older. The average household size was 2.66 and the average family size was 3.10.

The median age in the village was 32 years. 24% of residents were under the age of 18; 12.4% were between the ages of 18 and 24; 28.5% were from 25 to 44; 23.3% were from 45 to 64; and 11.7% were 65 years of age or older. The gender makeup of the village was 51.9% male and 48.1% female.

=== 2000 census ===
As of the census of 2000, there were 156 people, 55 households, and 40 families living in the village. The population density was 1,442.0 inhabitants per square mile (556.8/km^{2}). There were 57 housing units at an average density of 526.9 per square mile (203.4/km^{2}). The racial makeup of the village was 99.36% White and 0.64% Asian.

There were 55 households, out of which 45.5% had children under the age of 18 living with them, 56.4% were married couples living together, 12.7% had a female householder with no husband present, and 25.5% were non-families. 20.0% of all households were made up of individuals living alone, in addition with 5.5% who were 65 years of age or older. The average household size was 2.84 and the average family size was 3.34.

In the village, the population was spread out, with 31.4% under the age of 18, 8.3% from 18 to 24, 31.4% from 25 to 44, 17.9% from 45 to 64, and 10.9% who were 65 years of age or older. The median age was 36 years. For every 100 females there were 116.7 males. For every 100 females age 18 and over, there were 105.8 males.

The median income for a household in the village was $45,833, and the median income for a family was $45,625. Males had a median income of $40,208 versus $27,000 for females. The per capita income for the village was $18,323. About 4.2% of families and 7.3% of the population were below the poverty line, including 14.6% of those under the age of eighteen and 11.1% of those 65 or over.

== Notable people ==
- Bill Faul, MLB baseball player
