= Little Miami Schools =

School district in Ohio

Location
- Morrow, Ohio, United States

District information
- Type: Local school district
- Superintendent: Regina Morgan

Students and staff
- Students: 5,751

Other information
- Website: www.littlemiamischools.com

Little Miami Schools is a local school district in southern Warren County, Ohio, United States, situated mostly in Hamilton Township, Ohio. The district covers 98 square miles (250 km^{2}) of land, including the villages of Morrow, Butlerville, and Maineville, and the townships of Goshen, Hamilton, Union, Salem, Harlan, and Washington Townships.

Little Miami Schools has raised media attention in recent years for being the only school district in southwestern Ohio to fall under “fiscal emergency” designation from the Ohio Department of Education. Despite its financial woes, Little Miami has maintained its “above-average” rating from the Ohio Department of Education for the past three years.

The Little Miami Local School District consists of Little Miami High School, Little Miami Middle School, Little Miami Primary School, Little Miami Elementary School, and the Little Miami Early Childhood Center. Harlan-Butlerville Primary School was sold, and Hamilton-Maineville Primary School has been repurposed for administrative and maintenance purposes. Little Miami Preschool is located within the Early Childhood Center.

== History ==
The Little Miami School District was formed in 1954 after the residents of the Butlerville, Maineville and Morrow school districts agreed to consolidate. Emery Bethel was named as the district's first superintendent. A bond issue was soon passed to build a new central high school on Welch Road in Morrow, Ohio, and the class of 1957 was the first to graduate from the new building.

Until that time, the existing Morrow Elementary building had served as the area's high school. Dedicated in 1914, the original Morrow building housed grades 1-12. To fund its construction, the Morrow Board of Education passed a resolution on Oct. 14, 1913, to place a $40,000 bond issue on the ballot. The bond issue passed by a vote of 96 for, 93 against.

It would be more than 40 years before another stand-alone school building was constructed in Little Miami. In November 1997, voters approved a 5.44 mill, 27-year bond issue that would raise $17.6 million for the purpose constructing a new high school building. The new Little Miami High School was dedicated in 2000.

Around this time, the district entered into a period of unprecedented growth. Beginning with the 2001-2002 school year, the district grew by 200 students on average for the next seven years, with student enrollment rising from 2,826 in 2001-2002, to 4,313 in 2008-2009.

In response to this growth, the district created a five-year facility use plan that called for the continued operation of “neighborhood” schools in Butlerville, Morrow and Maineville, while planning for the construction of a new intermediate and new junior high facilities. This plan set out to alleviate overcrowding in the former high school building on Welch Road that was serving as an intermediate/junior high complex, and to house anticipated future growth.

In May 2006, voters approved a 6.15 mill bond issue to fund facility improvements at Morrow, Harlan-Butlerville and Hamilton-Maineville Elementaries and to construct a new intermediate school and a new junior high school. Little Miami Intermediate School, built on donated land at the corner of Zoar and Stephens Road in Hamilton Township and Little Miami Junior High School, built contiguous to the high school, were both dedicated in 2009 and opened to students.

After another six years of unprecedented enrollment growth, in May, 2018, voters approved a $64.6 million bond issue to construct a new preK-1 building, and additions to the high school, junior high and intermediate school.

== Financial issues ==
In July 2007, a new two-year state budget was released that changed the formula that the state used to fund public schools. As a result, Little Miami lost $6 million in projected state revenue that year. The following year financial and credit markets crashed, plunging the national economy into recession and affecting the local community's ability to financially support its schools.

Despite the economic downturn, Little Miami continued to grow rapidly in student population. In October, 2008, net enrollment increased by 335 students over the previous school year. Decreased funding coupled with increased student enrollment forced the district to begin looking at a combination of budget cuts and ballot issues to remain solvent.

In November, 2008, voters rejected a one-percent earnings tax to fund schools, launching a string of eight levy defeats for Little Miami. The failed issues were:

- May 2009 – 9.95 mill, three-year property tax
- November 2009 – 7.95 mill, five-year incremental property tax
- February 2010 – 16.95 mill, five-year property tax
- May 2010 – 6.48 mill, five-year property tax and a one-percent, five-year earnings tax
- November 2010 – 10.95 mill, five-year incremental property tax
- May 2011 – 13.95 mill, five-year property tax

=== State takeover ===
Following the November 2009 ballot defeat, Little Miami Local Schools were placed in state-designated "fiscal caution". Fiscal caution is the first of level of state oversight for schools with actual or projected fiscal deficits that trigger corrective assistance from the Ohio Department of Education. After the February, 2010 defeat, the district was placed in “fiscal watch” and was projecting an $5 million shortfall by the end of the fiscal year. After the May 2010 ballot defeat, the district was placed in "fiscal emergency".

In July 2010, a state-appointed fiscal planning and supervision commission convened its first meeting in Little Miami. This commission, provided for in the Ohio Revised Code, supersedes the local board of education, and has the power to review all district finances, the power to approve or reject actions taken by the local board and the power to create and enforce a district recovery plan to regain solvency.

The district received its first solvency assistance loan from the state in December 2010 in the amount of $5,071,000 to cover its budget shortfall for the remainder of the fiscal year. A second loan payment of $5,952,000 was received in July 2010, resulting in a total of more than $11 million in no-interest loans the district would be required to pay back into the solvency assistance fund in two years.

During the course of Little Miami's financial spiral downward, the district cut 105 positions, cut approximately $10 million from its operating budget, closed Morrow and Harlan-Butlerville Elementary Schools, cut art, music and physical education classes at the elementary school level, reduced bus service to state minimums, instated athletics pay-to-participate fees of $651 per student per sport, reduced course offerings at the high school and eliminated community use of buildings due to staff shortages.

The media consistently covered Little Miami's financial woes during this period and the district's nine trips to the ballot box. Local newspapers and television crews ran numerous stories on the cuts the district had instituted and were on hand each election night to capture the latest results. Of particular interest was the nearly 50-50 split of “yes” and “no” voters in the district.

Little Miami also gained national attention from the Wall Street Journal and from educational trade magazines as many parties wished to study what happened when a community cannot or will not choose to support its schools financially.

In 2011, as part of the district's recovery plan, the fiscal planning and supervision commission required Little Miami to begin operating at state minimum standards. These included reducing graduation requirements to 20 hours from 24, and increasing student teacher ratios. The commission also directed the district to close Maineville Elementary School and to place a levy on the November 2011 ballot.

=== Financial recovery ===
After nine similar attempts, a 13.95 mill, five-year property tax passed by a margin of 74 votes in November 2011. Voter approval of this measure allowed the district to begin planning for repaying its solvency assistance loan and for restoring a handful of services.

In February, 2012, the Little Miami Local School Board approved a reconfiguration plan that would restore full busing services, return half-day, every day kindergarten, re-open Harlan-Butlerville and Hamilton-Maineville Elementaries and the return of art, music and physical education in grades K-8. The state fiscal planning and supervision commission rejected this plan at its February meeting, but then reversed its decision in March 2012.

On April 17, 2012, the Little Miami Local School Board approved a measure to reduce pay-to-participate fees to $350 per student per sport at the high school level and $275 per student per sport at the junior high level. The fiscal planning and supervision commission approved the same measure on April 24, 2012.

On May 22, 2013, the state Fiscal Planning and Supervision Commission voted to release Little Miami Local Schools from fiscal emergency and also voted to disband, ending 34 months of state oversight of district operations. By the end of the 2014 fiscal year, the district will have repaid a total of $11 million in solvency assistance loans and will be free of that debt.
