= Butlerville, Ohio =

- Village
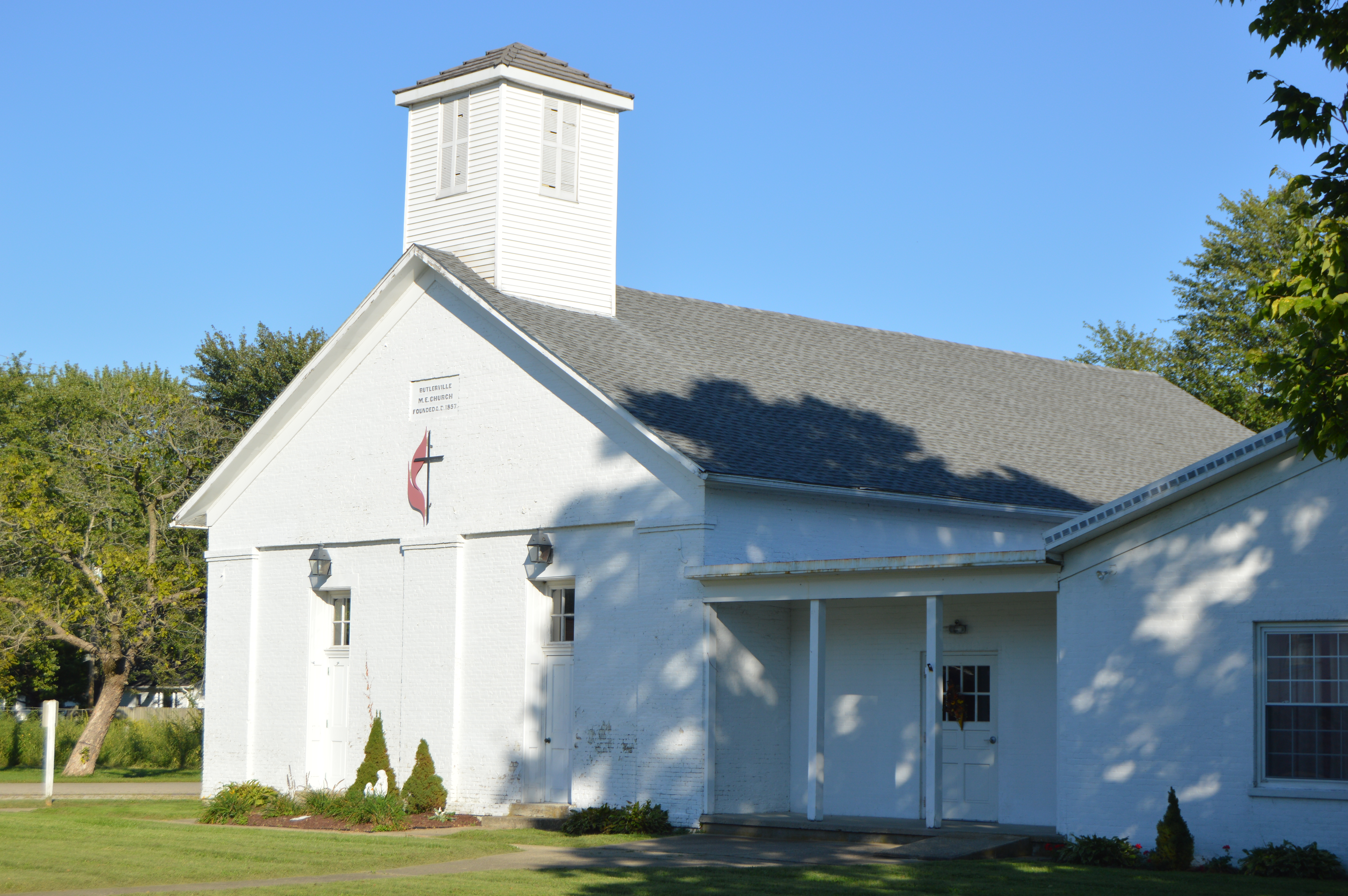
- Methodist church, built 1857

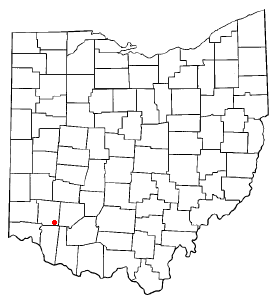
- Location of Butlerville, Ohio

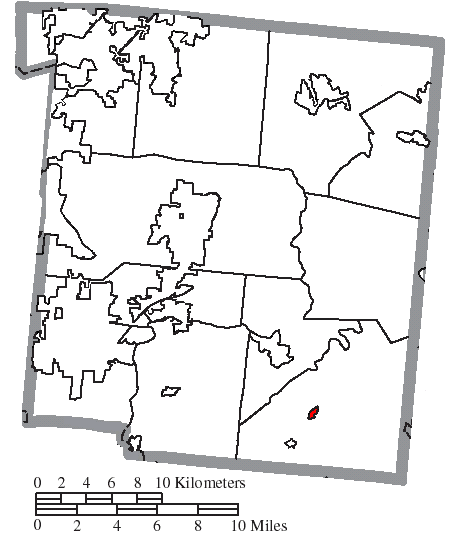
- Location of Butlerville in Warren County
- Coordinates: 39°18′06″N 84°05′25″W
- Country: United States
- State: Ohio
- County: Warren

Area
  - Total: 0.11 sq mi (0.28 km^{2})
  - Land: 0.11 sq mi (0.28 km^{2})
  - Water: 0 sq mi (0.00 km^{2})
- Elevation: 860 ft (260 m)

Population (2020)
  - Total: 155
  - Estimate (2023): 156
  - Density: 1,419.9/sq mi (548.23/km^{2})
- Time zone: UTC-5 (Eastern (EST))
  - Summer (DST): UTC-4 (EDT)
- ZIP code: 45162
- Area code: 513
- FIPS code: 39-10674
- GNIS feature ID: 2397513

Butlerville is a village in central Harlan Township, Warren County, Ohio, United States, located in the southwestern part of the state. The population was 155 at the 2020 census.

The village is in the Little Miami Local School District. Telephone service is provided through the Butlerville exchange and mail is delivered through the Pleasant Plain post office.

== History ==
Butlerville was platted in 1838 when a new turnpike was extended to that point. The village was named for its founder, Abram B. Butler. Butlerville incorporated as a village in 1851. A post office was established at Butlerville in 1833, and remained in operation until 1905.

== Geography ==
According to the United States Census Bureau, the village has a total area of 0.11 square miles (0.28 km^{2}), all land.

== Demographics ==
Historical population
Census	Pop.	Note	%±
1850	208		—
1870	191		—
1880	167		−12.6%
1890	125		−25.1%
1900	125		0.0%
1910	96		−23.2%
1920	97		1.0%
1930	68		−29.9%
1940	93		36.8%
1950	152		63.4%
1960	224		47.4%
1970	204		−8.9%
1980	223		9.3%
1990	188		−15.7%
2000	231		22.9%
2010	163		−29.4%
2020	155		−4.9%
2023 (est.)	156	▲	0.6%
U.S. Decennial Census

=== 2010 census ===
As of the census of 2010, there were 163 people, 56 households, and 41 families living in the village. The population density was 1,481.8 inhabitants per square mile (572.1/km^{2}). There were 60 housing units at an average density of 545.5 per square mile (210.6/km^{2}). The racial makeup of the village was 99.4% White and 0.6% African American. Hispanic or Latino of any race were 0.6% of the population.

There were 56 households, of which 41.1% had children under the age of 18 living with them, 58.9% were married couples living together, 8.9% had a female householder with no husband present, 5.4% had a male householder with no wife present, and 26.8% were non-families. 17.9% of all households were made up of individuals, and 1.8% had someone living alone who was 65 years of age or older. The average household size was 2.91 and the average family size was 3.27.

The median age in the village was 33.3 years. 29.4% of residents were under the age of 18; 9.8% were between the ages of 18 and 24; 26.9% were from 25 to 44; 26.4% were from 45 to 64; and 7.4% were 65 years of age or older. The gender makeup of the village was 50.9% male and 49.1% female.

=== 2000 census ===
As of the census of 2000, there were 231 people, 80 households, and 69 families living in the village. The population density was 1,563.5 inhabitants per square mile (603.7/km^{2}). There were 84 housing units at an average density of 568.5 per square mile (219.5/km^{2}). The racial makeup of the village was 98.70% White, and 1.30% from two or more races.

There were 80 households, out of which 42.5% had children under the age of 18 living with them, 68.8% were married couples living together, 10.0% had a female householder with no husband present, and 13.8% were non-families. 13.8% of all households were made up of individuals, and 3.8% had someone living alone who was 65 years of age or older. The average household size was 2.89 and the average family size was 3.16.

In the village, the population was spread out, with 27.3% under the age of 18, 12.1% from 18 to 24, 31.6% from 25 to 44, 21.2% from 45 to 64, and 7.8% who were 65 years of age or older. The median age was 34 years. For every 100 females there were 110.0 males. For every 100 females age 18 and over, there were 104.9 males.

The median income for a household in the village was $46,458, and the median income for a family was $47,083. Males had a median income of $32,813 versus $25,417 for females. The per capita income for the village was $15,916. None of the families and 0.9% of the population were living below the poverty line.
