= Morrow, Ohio =

- Village
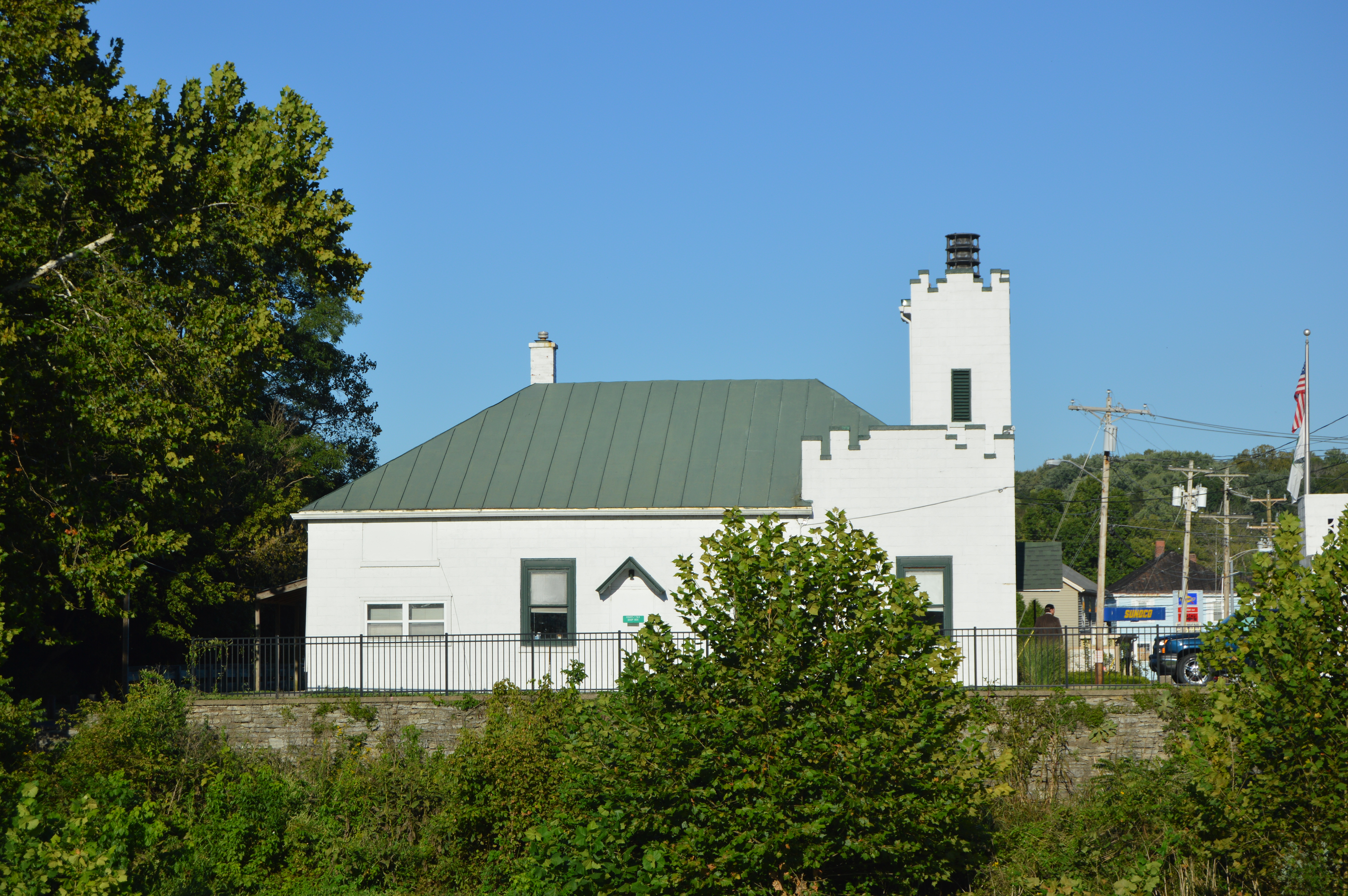
- Village Hall

- Flag

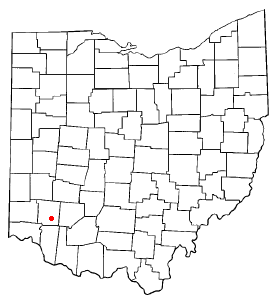
- Location of Morrow, Ohio

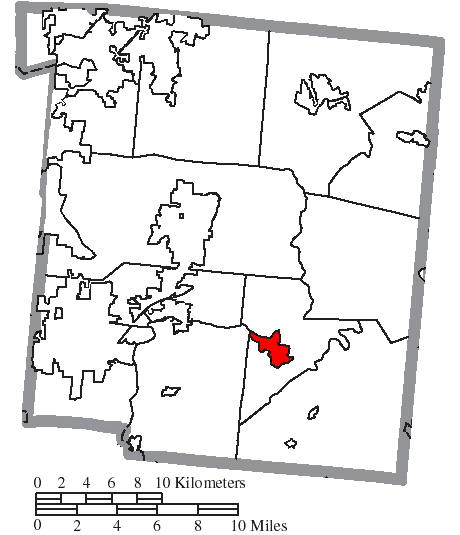
- Location of Morrow in Warren County
- Coordinates: 39°20′58″N 84°07′37″W
- Country: United States
- State: Ohio
- County: Warren

Area
  - Total: 2.10 sq mi (5.45 km^{2})
  - Land: 2.04 sq mi (5.28 km^{2})
  - Water: 0.069 sq mi (0.18 km^{2})
- Elevation: 643 ft (196 m)

Population (2020)
  - Total: 2,049
  - Density: 1,005.8/sq mi (388.36/km^{2})
- Time zone: UTC−5 (Eastern (EST))
  - Summer (DST): UTC−4 (EDT)
- ZIP Code: 45152
- Area code: 513
- FIPS code: 39-52374
- GNIS feature ID: 2399400
- Website: https://www.morrowoh.com/

Morrow is a village in Salem Township, Warren County, Ohio, United States. The population was 2,049 at the 2020 census.

== History ==
Morrow was platted in 1845, when the railroad was extended to that point. The village is named for Jeremiah Morrow, 9th Governor of Ohio. A post office has been in operation at Morrow since 1845.

== Geography ==
According to the United States Census Bureau, the village has a total area of 1.97 square miles (5.10 km^{2}), of which 1.93 square miles (5.00 km^{2}) is land and 0.04 square miles (0.10 km^{2}) is water.

== Demographics ==
Historical population
| Census | Pop. | Note | %± |
|---|---|---|---|
| 1850 | 459 | | — |
| 1860 | 720 | | 56.9% |
| 1870 | 708 | | −1.7% |
| 1880 | 946 | | 33.6% |
| 1890 | 842 | | −11.0% |
| 1900 | 869 | | 3.2% |
| 1910 | 832 | | −4.3% |
| 1920 | 803 | | −3.5% |
| 1930 | 738 | | −8.1% |
| 1940 | 840 | | 13.8% |
| 1950 | 1,137 | | 35.4% |
| 1960 | 1,477 | | 29.9% |
| 1970 | 1,486 | | 0.6% |
| 1980 | 1,254 | | −15.6% |
| 1990 | 1,206 | | −3.8% |
| 2000 | 1,286 | | 6.6% |
| 2010 | 1,188 | | −7.6% |
| 2020 | 2,049 | | 72.5% |
U.S. Decennial Census

=== 2010 census ===
As of the census of 2010, there were 1,188 people, 455 households, and 298 families living in the village. The population density was 615.5 inhabitants per square mile (237.6/km^{2}). There were 522 housing units at an average density of 270.5 per square mile (104.4/km^{2}). The racial makeup of the village was 96.5% White, 0.4% African American, 0.2% Native American, 0.3% Asian, 0.6% from other races, and 2.0% from two or more races. Hispanic or Latino of any race were 2.0% of the population.

There were 455 households, of which 36.3% had children under the age of 18 living with them, 45.5% were married couples living together, 13.4% had a female householder with no husband present, 6.6% had a male householder with no wife present, and 34.5% were non-families. Of all households 29.0% were made up of individuals, and 17.6% had someone living alone who was 65 years of age or older. The average household size was 2.53 and the average family size was 3.07.

The median age in the village was 39 years. 24.8% of residents were under the age of 18; 6.7% were between the ages of 18 and 24; 26.7% were from 25 to 44; 26% were from 45 to 64; and 15.8% were 65 years of age or older. The gender makeup of the village was 48.2% male and 51.8% female.

=== 2000 census ===
As of the census of 2000, there were 1,286 people, 462 households, and 298 families living in the village. The population density was 760.7 inhabitants per square mile (293.7/km^{2}). There were 498 housing units at an average density of 294.6 per square mile (113.7/km^{2}). The racial makeup of the village was 97.82% White, 0.70% African American, 0.86% Native American, 0.08% Asian, 0.16% from other races, and 0.39% from two or more races. Hispanic or Latino of any race were 2.18% of the population.

There were 462 households, out of which 34.0% had children under the age of 18 living with them, 47.4% were married couples living together, 14.1% had a female householder with no husband present, and 35.3% were non-families. Of all households 29.0% were made up of individuals, and 14.5% had someone living alone who was 65 years of age or older. The average household size was 2.58 and the average family size was 3.19.

In the village, the population was spread out, with 25.6% under the age of 18, 6.6% from 18 to 24, 30.6% from 25 to 44, 21.4% from 45 to 64, and 15.9% who were 65 years of age or older. The median age was 37 years. For every 100 females there were 85.8 males. For every 100 females age 18 and over, there were 83.0 males.

The median income for a household in the village was $32,566, and the median income for a family was $44,750. Males had a median income of $31,827 versus $24,444 for females. The per capita income for the village was $15,416. About 5.2% of families and 15.5% of the population were below the poverty line, including 10.1% of those under age 18 and 11.1% of those age 65 or over.

== Education ==
The village is in the Little Miami Schools.

The Salem Township Public Library is a lending library located within the village limits.

== Government and infrastructure ==
The Morrow Post Office of the United States Postal Service is located at 531 West Pike Street.

The village has a 1% income tax.

== Music ==
- The town is the subject of a song called "I Want to Go to Morrow", about a man who wishes to take a train "to Morrow" and return "tomorrow" night, playing on the similar pronunciations of the two phrases. An early recording of the song, by Dan W. Quinn, was released in 1903. The song was popularly recorded by The Kingston Trio.

== Notable people ==
- Merie Earle, actress
- Earl Fuller, pioneer American jazz bandleader
- Mark Whitacre, FBI informant
