= Warren County, Ohio =

County in Ohio, United States

- County
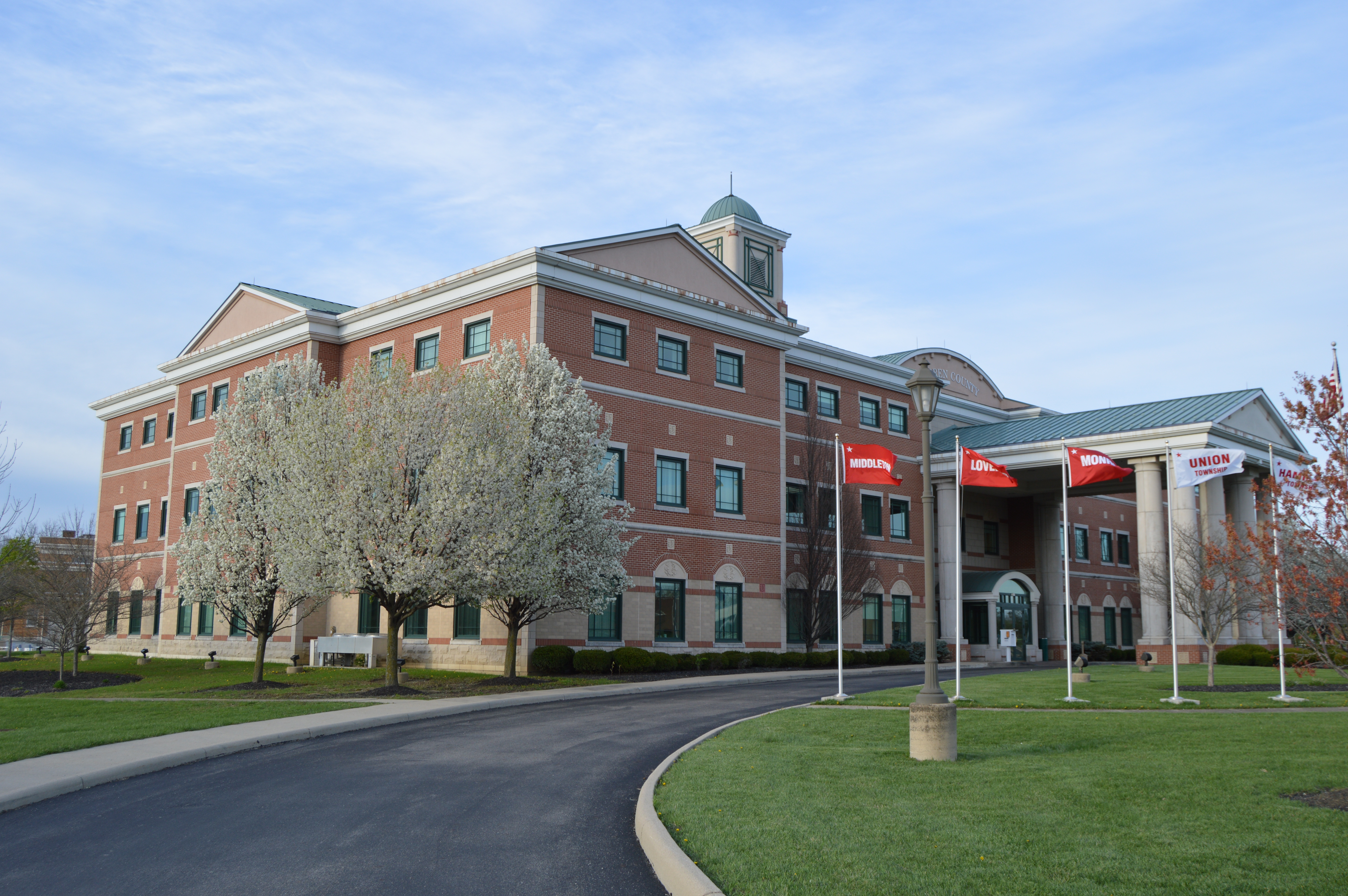
- Warren County Administration Building in Lebanon, Ohio

- Flag Seal

- Location within the U.S. state of Ohio
- Coordinates: 39°26′N 84°10′W
- Country: United States
- State: Ohio
- Founded: May 1, 1803
- Named for: Dr. Joseph Warren
- Seat: Lebanon
- Largest city: Mason

Area
  - Total: 407 sq mi (1,050 km^{2})
  - Land: 401 sq mi (1,040 km^{2})
  - Water: 6.0 sq mi (16 km^{2}) 1.5%

Population (2020)
  - Total: 242,337
  - Estimate (2025): 257,181 ▲
  - Density: 604/sq mi (233/km^{2})
- Time zone: UTC−5 (Eastern)
  - Summer (DST): UTC−4 (EDT)
- Congressional district: 1st
- Website: co.warren.oh.us

Warren County is a county located in the southwestern part of the U.S. state of Ohio. As of the 2020 census, the population was 242,337. Its county seat is Lebanon and most populous city is Mason. The county is one of Ohio's most affluent, with the second highest median income of the state's 88 counties. The county was established on May 1, 1803, from Hamilton County; it is named for Dr. Joseph Warren, a hero of the Revolution who sent Paul Revere and the overlooked William Dawes on their famous rides and who died at the Battle of Bunker Hill. Warren County is part of the Cincinnati, OH-KY-IN Metropolitan Statistical Area.

== History ==
Warren County was established in 1803. The first non-Native American settlers were migrants from New England. During the election of 1860 Abraham Lincoln received 60% of the vote in Warren County, and in 1864 he was reelected with 70% of the vote in the county. From that time on the county was a stronghold of the Republican party, with Ulysses S. Grant going on to carry the county by large margins in both 1868 and 1872.

== Geography ==
According to the United States Census Bureau, the county has a total area of 407 square miles (1,050 km^{2}), of which 401 square miles (1,040 km^{2}) is land and 6.0 square miles (16 km^{2}) (1.5%) is water. The county is a rough square with the sides about 20 miles (32 km) long.

=== Adjacent counties ===
- Montgomery County (northwest)
- Greene County (northeast)
- Clinton County (east)
- Clermont County (south)
- Hamilton County (southwest)
- Butler County (west)

=== Boundaries ===
Warren County was created by the first Ohio General Assembly in the Act of March 24, 1803, which also created Butler and Montgomery Counties. The act defined Warren County as "all that part of the county of Hamilton included within the following bounds, viz.: Beginning at the northeast corner of the county of Clermont, running thence west with the line of said county to the Little Miami; thence up the same with the meanders thereof to the north boundary of the first tier of sections in the second entire range of townships in the Miami Purchase; thence west to the northeast corner of Section No. 7 in the third township of the aforesaid range; thence north to the Great Miami; thence up the same to the middle of the fifth range of townships; thence east to the County line; thence with same south to the place of beginning." Originally this included land now in Clinton County as far east as Wilmington.

Clinton County proved a continuing headache to the legislature. The Ohio Constitution requires that every county have an area of at least four hundred square miles (1,036 km^{2}). Clinton County's boundaries were several times adjusted in an effort to comply with that clause of the constitution. One of them, the Act of January 30, 1815, detached a strip of land from the eastern side to give to Clinton. That would have left Warren under four hundred square miles (1,036 km^{2}), so a portion of Butler County (the part of Franklin Township where Carlisle is now located) was attached to Warren in compensation. The 1815 act was as follows:

- Section 1—That all that part of the county of Butler lying and being within the first and second fractional townships in the fifth range, and adjoining the south line of Montgomery County, shall be and the same is hereby attached to and made part of the county of Warren.
- Section 2—That eleven square miles 28 km^{2} of the territory of the county of Warren and extending parallel to the said eastern boundary of Warren County, along the whole length of such eastern boundary from north to south, shall be and the same is hereby attached to and made a part of the county of Clinton."

Except for the sections formed by the Great and Little Miamis, the sides are all straight lines.

=== Lakes and rivers ===
The major rivers of the county are the Great Miami River, which flows through the northwest corner of the county in Franklin Township, and the Little Miami River which zig-zags across the county from north to south. There is one sizable lake, the Caesars Creek Reservoir, created by a U.S. Army Corps of Engineers dam on Caesars Creek in the northeast part of the county in Massie Township.

== Demographics ==
Historical population
Census	Pop.	Note	%±
1810	9,925		—
1820	17,837		79.7%
1830	21,468		20.4%
1840	23,141		7.8%
1850	25,560		10.5%
1860	26,902		5.3%
1870	26,689		−0.8%
1880	28,392		6.4%
1890	25,468		−10.3%
1900	25,584		0.5%
1910	24,497		−4.2%
1920	25,716		5.0%
1930	27,348		6.3%
1940	29,894		9.3%
1950	38,505		28.8%
1960	65,711		70.7%
1970	84,925		29.2%
1980	99,276		16.9%
1990	113,909		14.7%
2000	158,383		39.0%
2010	212,693		34.3%
2020	242,337		13.9%
2025 (est.)	257,181	▲	6.1%
U.S. Decennial Census; 1790-1960 1900-1990; 1990-2000 2010-2020

=== 2020 census ===
As of the 2020 census, the county had a population of 242,337. The median age was 40.0 years. 24.8% of residents were under the age of 18 and 15.5% of residents were 65 years of age or older. For every 100 females there were 100.1 males, and for every 100 females age 18 and over there were 98.6 males age 18 and over.

The racial makeup of the county was 82.6% White, 3.4% Black or African American, 0.2% American Indian and Alaska Native, 7.2% Asian, 0.1% Native Hawaiian and Pacific Islander, 1.1% from some other race, and 5.6% from two or more races. Hispanic or Latino residents of any race comprised 3.2% of the population.

82.5% of residents lived in urban areas, while 17.5% lived in rural areas.

There were 89,086 households in the county, of which 35.5% had children under the age of 18 living in them. Of all households, 60.5% were married-couple households, 13.7% were households with a male householder and no spouse or partner present, and 20.5% were households with a female householder and no spouse or partner present. About 21.8% of all households were made up of individuals and 9.9% had someone living alone who was 65 years of age or older.

There were 93,276 housing units, of which 4.5% were vacant. Among occupied housing units, 77.2% were owner-occupied and 22.8% were renter-occupied. The homeowner vacancy rate was 0.9% and the rental vacancy rate was 6.9%.

=== Racial and ethnic composition ===
Warren County, Ohio – Racial and ethnic composition Note: the US Census treats Hispanic/Latino as an ethnic category. This table excludes Latinos from the racial categories and assigns them to a separate category. Hispanics/Latinos may be of any race.
Race / Ethnicity (NH = Non-Hispanic)	Pop 1980	Pop 1990	Pop 2000	Pop 2010	Pop 2020	% 1980	% 1990	% 2000	% 2010	% 2020
White alone (NH)	96,861	110,124	148,850	189,305	198,227	97.57%	96.68%	93.98%	89.00%	81.80%
Black or African American alone (NH)	1,700	2,385	4,272	6,838	8,175	1.71%	2.09%	2.70%	3.21%	3.37%
Native American or Alaska Native alone (NH)	79	223	267	289	288	0.08%	0.20%	0.17%	0.14%	0.12%
Asian alone (NH)	169	626	1,978	8,261	17,278	0.17%	0.55%	1.25%	3.88%	7.13%
Native Hawaiian or Pacific Islander alone (NH)	x	x	40	93	158	x	x	0.03%	0.04%	0.07%
Other race alone (NH)	89	27	118	272	704	0.09%	0.02%	0.07%	0.13%	0.29%
Mixed race or Multiracial (NH)	x	x	1,225	2,851	9,769	x	x	0.77%	1.34%	4.03%
Hispanic or Latino (any race)	378	524	1,633	4,784	7,738	0.38%	0.46%	1.03%	2.25%	3.19%
Total	99,276	113,909	158,383	212,693	242,337	100.00%	100.00%	100.00%	100.00%	100.00%

=== 2010 census ===
As of the 2010 United States census, there were 212,693 people, 76,424 households, and 57,621 families residing in the county. The population density was 530.0 inhabitants per square mile (204.6/km^{2}). There were 80,750 housing units at an average density of 201.2 per square mile (77.7/km^{2}). The racial makeup of the county was 90.5% white, 3.9% Asian, 3.3% black or African American, 0.2% American Indian, 0.7% from other races, and 1.5% from two or more races. Those of Hispanic or Latino origin made up 2.2% of the population. In terms of ancestry, 28.7% were German, 14.1% were Irish, 12.0% were English, 11.6% were American, and 5.0% were Italian.

Of the 76,424 households, 40.1% had children under the age of 18 living with them, 62.6% were married couples living together, 8.8% had a female householder with no husband present, 24.6% were non-families, and 20.4% of all households were made up of individuals. The average household size was 2.70 and the average family size was 3.14. The median age was 37.8 years.

The median income for a household in the county was $71,274 and the median income for a family was $82,090. Males had a median income of $61,091 versus $41,331 for females. The per capita income for the county was $31,935. About 4.7% of families and 6.0% of the population were below the poverty line, including 7.6% of those under age 18 and 5.2% of those age 65 or over.

=== 2000 census ===
As of the census of 2000, there were 158,383 people, 55,966 households, and 43,261 families residing in the county. The population density was 396 inhabitants per square mile (153/km^{2}). There were 58,692 housing units at an average density of 147 per square mile (57/km^{2}). The racial makeup of the county was 94.66% White, 2.73% Black or African American, 0.18% Native American, 1.26% Asian, 0.03% Pacific Islander, 0.31% from other races, and 0.84% from two or more races. Hispanic or Latino of any race were 1.03% of the population.

There were 55,966 households, out of which 39.70% had children under the age of 18 living with them, 66.20% were married couples living together, 8.00% had a female householder with no husband present, and 22.70% were non-families. 18.90% of all households were made up of individuals, and 6.40% had someone living alone who was 65 years of age or older. The average household size was 2.72 and the average family size was 3.12.

In the county, the population was spread out, with 27.70% under the age of 18, 7.10% from 18 to 24, 34.00% from 25 to 44, 21.80% from 45 to 64, and 9.40% who were 65 years of age or older. The median age was 35 years. For every 100 females there were 102.60 males. For every 100 females age 18 and over, there were 102.40 males.

The median income for a household in the county was $57,952, and the median income for a family was $64,692. Males had a median income of $47,027 versus $30,862 for females. The per capita income for the county was $25,517. About 3.00% of families and 4.20% of the population were below the poverty line, including 4.40% of those under age 18 and 4.70% of those age 65 or over.

== Economy ==
Warren County is home to the Mason Business Center, a 2-million-square-foot (0.19 km^{2}) research and development facility for Procter and Gamble (P&G), whose global headquarters are located in downtown Cincinnati. Originally built in 1995 after three years of construction, P&G recently completed expansion of a new 500,000-square-foot (46,000 m^{2}) Beauty and Innovation Center in 2019, adding an additional 1,000 jobs for a total of 2,800 employees at the site. Mason is also home to the corporate headquarters of LensCrafters.

=== Top employers ===
According to the county's 2019 Comprehensive Annual Financial Report, the top employers in the county are:

#	Employer	# of employees
1	Procter and Gamble	3,036
2	Macy's Credit and Customer Service	2,250
3	LensCrafters	1,853
4	Cintas	1,512
5	Wellpoint	1,300
6	Anthem Blue Cross and Blue Shield	1,300
7	Warren County	1,276
8	Atrium Medical Center	1,200
9	Mason City Schools	1,184
10	Huma Care	1,000

== Government and infrastructure ==
Warren County has a 3-member Board of County Commissioners that administer and oversee the various County departments, similar to all but 2 of the 88 Ohio counties. The original county commissioners in 1804 were Robert Benham, Matthias Corwin and William James. The elected commissioners now serve four-year terms. Warren County's current elected commissioners are:

- County Commissioners: Tom Grossmann (R), Shannon Jones (R), and David Young (R).

=== Hospitals ===
- Atrium Medical Center – Middletown (Formerly Middletown Regional Hospital)
- Bethesda Medical Center at Arrow Springs – Lebanon (Branch of Bethesda North Hospital)
- Mercy Health Kings Mills Hospital - Kings Mills

=== Post offices ===
The following post offices, with ZIP codes, serve Warren County:

- Blanchester, 45107
- Carlisle, 45005
- Cincinnati (Sharonville branch), 45241
- Cincinnati (Symmes branch), 45249
- Clarksville, 45113
- Dayton (Centerville/Washington Twp. branch), 45458
- Franklin, 45005
- Harveysburg, 45032
- Goshen, 45122
- Kings Mills, 45034
- Lebanon, 45036
- Loveland, 45140
- Maineville, 45039
- Mason, 45040
- Miamisburg, 45342
- Middletown, 45044
- Monroe, 45050
- Morrow, 45152
- Oregonia, 45054
- Pleasant Plain, 45162
- South Lebanon, 45065
- Springboro, 45066
- Waynesville, 45068

=== Telephone service ===
These are the telephone companies serving Warren County: CenturyLink (CL); FairPoint Communications (FP); Altafiber (AF); AT&T (AT&T); TDS Telecom (TDS); and Frontier Communications (F). Warren County is in the 513 and 937 area codes.

The following exchange areas serve Warren County, listed with the area code and incumbent local exchange carrier (ILEC) abbreviation from above serving that exchange (list may not be up-to-date):

- Bellbrook (937-AT&T): 310, 661, 848
- Blanchester (937-F): 783
- Butlerville (513-TDS): 877
- Centerville (937-AT&T): 350, 619, 885, 886
- Clarksville (937-F): 289, 501, 574, 577
- Franklin (937-AT&T): 514, 550, 557, 704, 743, 746, 748, 790, 806, 928
- Germantown (937-FP): 855
- Lebanon (513-CL): 228, 282, 331, 695, 696, 836, 850, 932, 933, 934
- Little Miami (513-Cin): 239, 248, 274, 334, 340, 444, 453, 575, 576, 583, 600, 677, 683, 697, 707, 716, 722, 774, 831, 833, 965
- Mason (513-CL): 336, 339, 398, 459, 492, 573, 622, 754, 229, 234, 701, 770
- Miamisburg-West Carrollton (937-AT&T): 247, 353, 384, 388, 530, 560, 847, 859, 865, 866, 914
- Middletown (513-AT&T): 217, 222, 224, 261, 267, 292, 306, 318, 320, 355, 392, 420, 422, 423, 424, 425, 433, 435, 464, 465, 571, 594, 649, 705, 727, 783, 804, 849, 890, 915
- Monroe (513-AT&T): 360, 539
- Morrow (513-CL): 899
- New Burlington (937-F): 488
- South Lebanon (513-CL): 268, 480, 494
- Spring Valley (937-AT&T): 317, 659, 862
- Springboro (937-AT&T): 743, 746, 748, 885, 886 - (513-CL): 902, 915, 956
- Waynesville (513-CL): 897

== Politics ==
Warren County has long been one of the most Republican counties in Ohio, and has been since the party was established in the 1850s. Since the first presidential election after its founding, 1856, Warren County has supported the Republican candidate for president all but once, the exception being 1964 when Warren County voted for Democrat Lyndon B. Johnson over Barry M. Goldwater. Jimmy Carter is the only other Democrat since Franklin D. Roosevelt to win as much as 40 percent of the county's vote. In 2008, Warren County cast the largest net vote for John McCain of any Ohio county. Before the Republican Party was formed, Warren County supported the Whigs.

The Republican trend is no less pronounced at the state level. Since 1869, Warren County has almost always supported the Republican candidate for Governor of Ohio, the exceptions being in 1924 when it supported Vic Donahey, 1932 (George White), 1952 (Frank Lausche), and 1958 (Michael V. DiSalle). However, other than DiSalle, each of these four Democrats, who were all victorious statewide, were conservative Democrats.

In local races, Warren County occasionally elected Democrats for much of the 20th century. In 1976, two of the three county commission seats were won by Democrats, and as late as the 1990s, local elections between Democrats and Republicans frequently remained competitive. However, with the massive expansion of Warren County's population in the 1990s, the county turned as solidly Republican at the local level as it already was at other levels, with Republicans typically running unopposed. In elections between 1996 and 2012, in which eight county offices were on the ballot, no Democrat even filed. In November 1999, the last elected Democrat to hold office in Warren County, a member of the Educational Service Center (county school board), lost her seat to a Republican.

United States presidential election results for Warren County, Ohio
Year	Republican		Democratic		Third party(ies)	
Year	No.	%	No.	%	No.	%
1856	2,688	55.91%	1,776	36.94%	344	7.15%
1860	3,316	60.62%	2,011	36.76%	143	2.61%
1864	3,911	70.84%	1,610	29.16%	0	0.00%
1868	3,917	67.63%	1,875	32.37%	0	0.00%
1872	3,763	63.38%	2,168	36.52%	6	0.10%
1876	4,146	61.79%	2,559	38.14%	5	0.07%
1880	4,565	63.86%	2,564	35.87%	19	0.27%
1884	4,318	62.73%	2,481	36.05%	84	1.22%
1888	4,173	59.78%	2,598	37.22%	210	3.01%
1892	3,807	59.00%	2,400	37.19%	246	3.81%
1896	4,379	60.53%	2,794	38.62%	61	0.84%
1900	4,311	60.59%	2,675	37.60%	129	1.81%
1904	4,381	67.11%	2,012	30.82%	135	2.07%
1908	4,233	60.51%	2,656	37.96%	107	1.53%
1912	2,788	44.49%	2,101	33.52%	1,378	21.99%
1916	3,610	54.35%	2,937	44.22%	95	1.43%
1920	7,464	64.96%	3,956	34.43%	71	0.62%
1924	6,729	69.02%	2,406	24.68%	614	6.30%
1928	8,708	77.62%	2,455	21.88%	56	0.50%
1932	7,421	56.37%	5,547	42.13%	197	1.50%
1936	7,359	50.04%	7,209	49.02%	139	0.95%
1940	8,722	55.85%	6,895	44.15%	0	0.00%
1944	8,598	59.86%	5,765	40.14%	0	0.00%
1948	7,584	56.56%	5,793	43.20%	32	0.24%
1952	11,529	62.04%	7,054	37.96%	0	0.00%
1956	13,673	65.53%	7,193	34.47%	0	0.00%
1960	14,505	64.61%	7,945	35.39%	0	0.00%
1964	10,982	46.96%	12,406	53.04%	0	0.00%
1968	12,663	48.68%	6,756	25.97%	6,595	25.35%
1972	20,210	72.45%	6,941	24.88%	746	2.67%
1976	16,115	53.83%	13,349	44.59%	471	1.57%
1980	22,430	63.14%	11,306	31.83%	1,786	5.03%
1984	29,848	76.40%	9,031	23.11%	191	0.49%
1988	31,419	73.38%	11,145	26.03%	254	0.59%
1992	27,998	53.02%	13,542	25.65%	11,262	21.33%
1996	33,210	59.94%	17,089	30.84%	5,110	9.22%
2000	48,318	69.95%	19,142	27.71%	1,618	2.34%
2004	68,037	72.06%	26,044	27.58%	341	0.36%
2008	71,691	67.36%	33,398	31.38%	1,337	1.26%
2012	76,564	68.85%	32,909	29.60%	1,724	1.55%
2016	77,643	65.63%	33,730	28.51%	6,936	5.86%
2020	87,988	64.49%	46,069	33.76%	2,384	1.75%
2024	91,132	64.74%	47,128	33.48%	2,499	1.78%

== Education ==
=== Public school districts ===
School districts include:

- Blanchester City School District (also in Brown, Clermont, and Clinton)
- Carlisle Local School District (also in Montgomery)
  - Carlisle High School, Carlisle (the Indians)
- Clinton-Massie Local School District (also in Clinton)
- Franklin City School District
  - Franklin High School, Franklin (the Wildcats)
- Goshen Local School District (also in Clermont)
  - Goshen High School
- Kings Local School District
  - Kings High School, Kings Mills (the Knights)
- Lebanon City School District
  - Lebanon High School, Lebanon (the Warriors)
- Little Miami Local School District (also in Clermont)
  - Little Miami High School, Morrow (the Panthers)
- Loveland City School District (also in Clermont and Hamilton)
- Mason City School District
  - William Mason High School (Mason, Ohio), Mason (the Comets)
- Middletown City School District (also in Butler)
- Monroe Local School District (also in Butler)
  - Monroe High School
- Princeton City School District (also in Butler and Hamilton)
- Springboro Community City School District (also in Montgomery)
  - Springboro High School, Springboro (the Panthers)
- Sugarcreek Local School District
- Wayne Local School District
  - Waynesville High School, Waynesville (the Spartans)
- Xenia City School District (also in Greene and Clinton)

Non-geographic districts include:

- Warren County Vocational School District
  - Warren County Career Center, Lebanon

=== Private schools ===
- Bishop Fenwick High School – Franklin
- Lebanon Christian School – Lebanon
- Mars Hill Academy - Mason
- Middletown Christian Schools – Franklin
- St. Margaret of York School – Loveland
- Liberty Bible Academy – Mason
- St. Susanna Parish School – Mason
- Royalmont Academy – Mason
- St. Francis de Sales – Lebanon
- CinDay Academy - Springboro

=== Virtual schools ===
- Warren County Virtual Community School

=== Vocational schools ===
- Warren County Career Center

=== Colleges and universities ===
Warren County has no native colleges or universities, but was the original site selected for Miami University which instead located in Oxford, Ohio in 1809. National Normal University, a teachers college, was in Lebanon from 1855 until 1917 when it closed. Several colleges offer classes in Warren County at various locations, including Sinclair Community College of Dayton, the University of Cincinnati, and Wilmington College. Sinclair opened a branch in the Mason area in 2007. The University of Cincinnati owns 398 acres (1.61 km^{2}) of land at the intersections of I-71 and Wilmington road, but no plans for development on the site have been announced.

=== Libraries ===
The county has six public libraries:

- Franklin Public Library - Franklin
- Lebanon Public Library - Lebanon
- Mary L. Cook Public Library – Waynesville
- Mason Public Library - Mason
- Salem Township Public Library - Morrow
- Springboro Public Library - Springboro

== Media ==
The Journal-News circulates in Franklin, Springboro, Lebanon, and Turtlecreek Township. The Dayton Daily News, circulates in the northern part of the county. The Cincinnati Enquirer circulates through most of the county while the Cincinnati Post abandoned all distribution in the county in 2004.

Among its weekly papers was The Western Star, the oldest weekly in the state and the oldest newspaper west of the Appalachians published under its original name. It was closed on January 17, 2013. The Star, like the Pulse-Journal in Mason and the Star-Press in Springboro, was owned by the parent of the Middletown Journal and the Dayton Daily News, Cox Media Group. Other weeklies include the Franklin Chronicle.

For a time in the mid-1990s, Lebanon was the home of commercial radio station WMMA-FM, begun by Mike and Marilyn McMurray in 1994. The McMurrays sold to what was then known as American Radio Systems License Corp. a Boston-based chain of stations which also owned Cincinnati stations WGRR-FM and WKRQ (both since sold to various other owners). The new owners moved the station to Hamilton County. In 2010, the only radio station in the county at the time was WLMH-FM, a student-run station at Little Miami High School in Hamilton Township. It went off the air around 2010, and in 2012, the FCC removed WLMH from their database and cancelled their license as a result of no broadcasts for over a year.

Warren County is assigned to the Cincinnati television market, but Dayton television stations treat it as part of their market as well.

== Transportation ==
=== Airports ===
The Lebanon-Warren County Airport is located three nautical miles (3.5 mi; 5.6 km) northwest of Lebanon's central business district. The runway is a 4502' x 65' paved and lighted north–south runway (01/19), and parallel taxiway. Navigation and communications equipment includes PAPI, AWOS, Pilot Controlled Lighting, and UNICOM. The airport runway, taxiway, and navigation equipment is owned by the county. The county leases a public terminal, but other facilities are privately owned and operated under contract by a Fixed-base operator. The airport serves general and business aviation, but has no commercial airlines.

There are also two privately owned operating airports in the county; Waynesville airport, also known as Red Stewart Airfield (40I), and Caesar Creek Gliderport (2OH9), both with grass runways. Operations have ceased at two former private paved runway airports, Brownie's Lebanon Airport (19I), and Lebanon San Mar Gale (OH79).

=== Major highways ===
- I-71
- I-75
- US 22
- US 42
- SR 3
- SR 28
- SR 48
- SR 63
- SR 73
- SR 122
- SR 123
- SR 132
- SR 133
- SR 350
- SR 741

=== Rail and Bus ===
Warren County does not have passenger train service except for a scenic train that runs between Lebanon and Mason. Freight trains still serve Carlisle, and on a limited basis, Monroe, Mason, and Lebanon. Historically, there have been several trains that ran through the county whose stops became cities and villages. These trains include the Cincinnati, Lebanon and Northern Railway, the Middletown and Cincinnati Railroad, and the Little Miami Railroad whose path is now replaced by the Little Miami Bike Trail. There have been proposals to run commuter trains from Cincinnati to the Kings Island area, but none have ever found sufficient support or funding.

There is no public bus transportation based in Warren County, but there is limited service from Cincinnati to Mason and Kings Island. Middletown also runs bus service to eastern portions of Middletown that are in Warren County.

=== Waterways ===
There are no commercially navigable waterways in Warren County, but the Warren County Canal did operate in the 19th century as a branch of the Miami and Erie Canal, bringing freight to Lebanon by canal boat. Recreationally, the Little Miami River can be traveled by canoe or kayak for its length through the county, and motorized boating can be done at Caesar's Creek Lake.

== Recreation and attractions ==
- Kings Island: Theme park
- Cincinnati Open: Professional tennis tournament
- Great Wolf Lodge: Indoor water park resort
- Ozone Zipline Adventures: Ziplines ranging from 250 feet to 1300 feet
- Lebanon Mason Monroe Railroad: Nostalgic, themed train rides
- Fort Ancient: American Indian earthen mounds
- Caesar Creek State Park and Caesar Creek Lake
- Caesar's Creek Pioneer Village
- Little Miami Scenic Trail: Scenic bike trail
- Lebanon Countryside Trail
- The Golden Lamb: Ohio's oldest continuously operating inn
- La Comedia Dinner Theatre: Professional dinner theater
- Morgan's Canoe Livery: Canoe rental on Little Miami National Scenic River
- Bella Balloons & Gentle Breeze Balloons: Balloon sightseeing tours
- Vertical Advantage Helicopters: Helicopter sightseeing tours
- Start Skydiving: Skydiving
- Red Stewart Airfield: Airplane sightseeing tours from a grass-strip airfield
- Cincinnati AVP Open: Professional beach volleyball tournament
- Warren County Historical Society Museum
- Glendower State Memorial
- Miami Valley Gaming
- Ohio Renaissance Festival
- Lebanon Horse-Drawn Carriage Parade & Festival
- The Christmas Ranch

== Communities ==
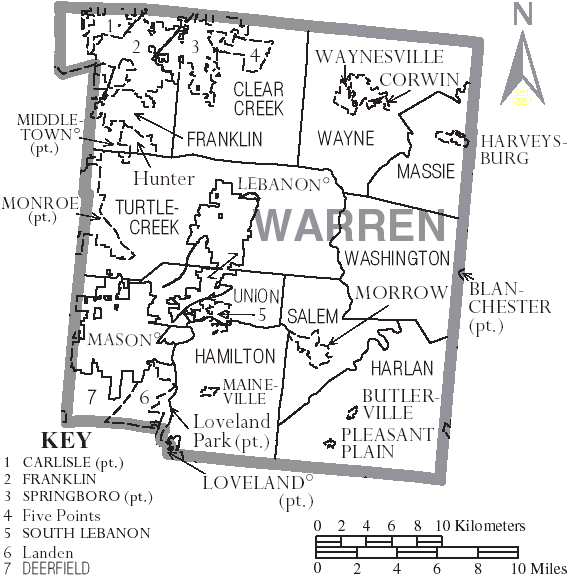
Map of Warren County, Ohio with municipal and township labels

=== Cities ===
- Carlisle (part)
- Franklin
- Lebanon (county seat)
- Loveland (part)
- Mason
- Middletown (part)
- Monroe (part)
- South Lebanon
- Springboro (part)

=== Villages ===
- Blanchester (part)
- Butlerville
- Corwin
- Harveysburg
- Maineville
- Morrow
- Pleasant Plain
- Waynesville

=== Townships ===
- Clearcreek
- Deerfield
- Franklin
- Hamilton
- Harlan
- Massie
- Salem
- Turtlecreek
- Union
- Washington
- Wayne

=== Census-designated places ===
- Five Points
- Hunter
- Kings Mills
- Landen
- Loveland Park
- Roachester

=== Unincorporated communities ===
- Beedles Station
- Blackhawk
- Blue Ball (a neighborhood of Middletown)
- Brown's Store
- Cozaddale
- Crosswick
- Dallasburg
- Dodds
- Edwardsville
- Fort Ancient
- Fosters
- Genn Town
- Greentree Corners
- Hagemans Crossing
- Hammel
- Hillcrest
- Henpeck
- Hicks
- Hopkinsville
- Kenricksville
- Level
- Mathers Mill
- Middleboro
- Mount Holly
- Murdoch
- Oregonia
- Pekin
- Red Lion
- Rossburg
- Ridgeville
- San Mar Gale
- Socialville
- Twenty Mile Stand
- Union Village
- Utica
- Zoar

== Notable people ==
- Neil Armstrong, Astronaut
- Robert Benham, Pioneer politician
- Clarence Brown, Jr., Congressman
- John Chivington, Civil War officer
- Thomas Corwin, Governor
- Brant Daugherty, Actor
- William H. P. Denny, Newspaper publisher
- Clifford B. Harmon, Aviator
- Woody Harrelson, Actor
- Cordell Hull, Secretary of State
- Bruce E. Ivins, Scientist
- Michael Larson, Game-show contestant
- Donald Lukens, Congressman
- William C. McClintock, Newspaper publisher
- John McLean, U.S. Supreme Court justice
- Jeremiah Morrow, Governor
- Marcus Mote, Early Ohio Artist
- Anthony Muñoz, NFL player
- Corwin M. Nixon, Ohio State Representative (1962-1992), Ohio House of Representatives Minority Leader (1979-1992)
- Dan Patrick, Sports broadcaster
- Marty Roe, Musician
- Thomas Ross, Congressman
- Larry Sparks, Musician
- Wilson E. Terry, Spanish–American War soldier
- Durbin Ward, Civil War general
- Mark Whitacre, FBI informant, Inspiration for the book and movie The Informant!
- Joseph Whitehill, Ohio state treasurer

== See also ==
=== Historical articles about Warren County ===
- Cincinnati, Lebanon and Northern Railway
- Little Miami Railroad
- Middletown and Cincinnati Railroad
- National Register of Historic Places listings in Warren County, Ohio
- Warren County Canal

=== State facilities in Warren County ===
- Lebanon Correctional Institution
- Warren Correctional Institution
- Ohio Department of Transportation District 8 headquarters
