= Dallasburg, Ohio =

Unincorporated community in Ohio, U.S.

Coordinates: 39°16′20″N 84°11′29″W

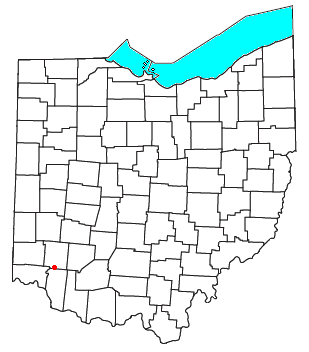
Location of Dallasburg, Ohio

Dallasburg is an unincorporated community in southern Hamilton Township, Warren County, Ohio, United States. It is located in Virginia Military Reserve Military Survey 3790, about one mile west of Cozaddale and two miles southeast of Murdoch.

A post office was established at Dallasburg in 1848, and remained in operation until 1871.
