= Zoar, Warren County, Ohio =

Unincorporated community in Ohio, U.S.

Coordinates: 39°21′03″N 84°11′30″W

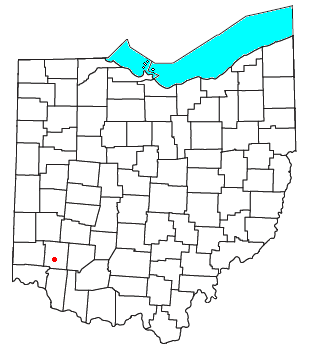
Location of Zoar in Warren County, Ohio

Zoar is an unincorporated community in northern Hamilton Township, Warren County, Ohio, United States. It is located on the 3C Highway about one mile east of Hopkinsville and three miles west of Morrow in Virginia Military District Military Survey 1546.

A large share of the first settlers of Zoar were Germans. By the 1840s, Zoar was a local commercial center. With the construction of the railroad, business activity shifted away from inland Zoar, and the town's population dwindled.
