= Deerfield Township, Warren County, Ohio =

Township in Ohio, US

- Township
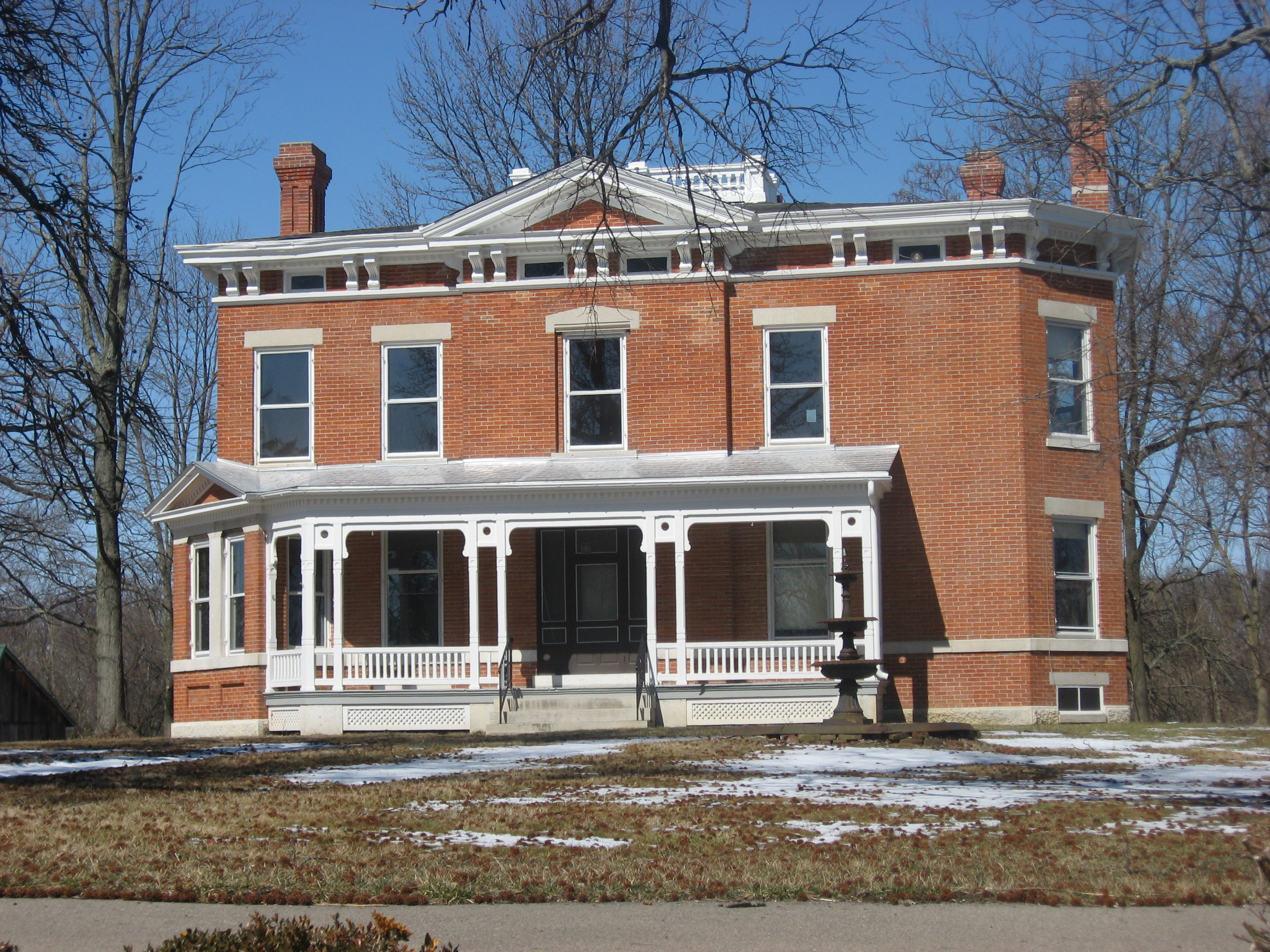
- Ahimaaz King House
- Motto: "Choose Deerfield"
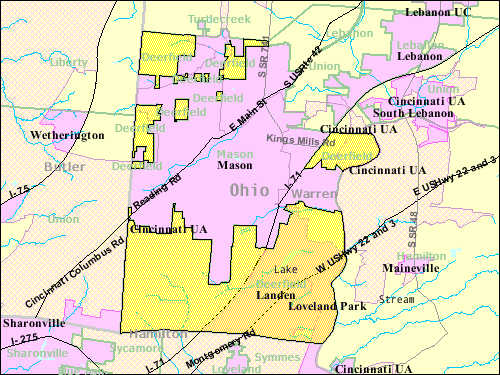
- Map of Deerfield Township in Warren County
- Coordinates: 39°18′52″N 84°17′34″W
- Country: United States
- State: Ohio
- County: Warren

Government
  - Type: Board of Trustees
  - President: Lelle Lutz Hedding

Area
  - Total: 16.8 sq mi (43.6 km^{2})
  - Land: 16.6 sq mi (43.1 km^{2})
  - Water: 0.19 sq mi (0.5 km^{2})
- Elevation: 840 ft (256 m)

Population (2020)
  - Total: 40,525
  - Density: 2,440/sq mi (940/km^{2})
- Time zone: UTC-5 (Eastern (EST))
  - Summer (DST): UTC-4 (EDT)
- Area code: 513
- FIPS code: 39-21238
- GNIS feature ID: 1087112
- Website: Choose Deerfield Township

Deerfield Township is one of the eleven townships of Warren County, Ohio, United States. The township is located in the southwest corner of the county and is part of the Cincinnati metropolitan area. The population was 40,525 as of the 2020 census.

== History ==
One of the original four townships of Warren County, Deerfield Township was organized on May 10, 1803. The township was named for mineral licks within its borders which attract deer.

== Geography ==
Located in the southwestern corner of the county, it borders the following townships:

- Turtlecreek Township - north
- Union Township - northeast
- Hamilton Township - east
- Symmes Township, Hamilton County - south
- Sycamore Township, Hamilton County - southwest
- West Chester Township, Butler County - west
- Liberty Township, Butler County - northwest

Communities within the township include Kings Mills, Snidercrest, Fosters, Socialville, Twenty Mile Stand, Loveland Park, and Landen.

== Demographics ==
=== 2020 census ===
Deerfield Township racial composition
| Race | Number | Percentage |
|---|---|---|
| White (NH) | 26,404 | 65.2% |
| Black or African American (NH) | 1,471 | 3.63% |
| Native American (NH) | 55 | 0.14% |
| Asian (NH) | 8,135 | 20.1% |
| Pacific Islander (NH) | 35 | 0.09% |
| Other/mixed | 2,876 | 7.10% |
| Hispanic or Latino | 1,549 | 3.82% |

== Government ==
The township is governed by a three-member board of trustees, who are elected in November of odd-numbered years to a four-year term beginning on the following January 1. Two are elected in the year after the presidential election and one is elected in the year before it. There is also an elected township fiscal officer, who serves a four-year term beginning on April 1 of the year after the election, which is held in November of the year before the presidential election. Vacancies in the fiscal officership or on the board of trustees are filled by the remaining trustees.

=== Education ===
Most of the township is in the Mason City and Kings Local school districts, but the extreme southwest corner of the township is in the Princeton City School District.
