= San Mar Gale, Ohio =

Unincorporated community in Ohio, U.S.

Coordinates: 39°27′N 84°8′W

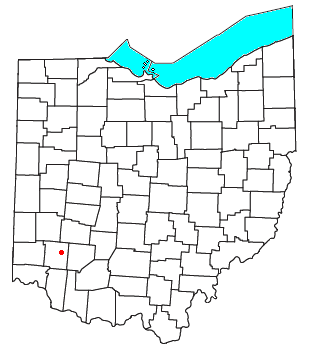
Location of San Mar Gale, Ohio

San Mar Gale is an unincorporated community and was a planned development by the Hines-Griffin Land Development Company in Turtlecreek of Warren County, Ohio, United States. This 2500+ home planned unit development was approved by the Warren County Commissioners in February 2006. Zoning approval included a central business district and multi-family housing near the center. A public referendum challenging the approval was placed on the ballot in November 2006, and the Commissioners approval was ratified by voters. Construction was to have begun in 2007, however the development was cancelled as of February 2011.

The development was to take place on a 3,329-acre (13 km^{2}) group of farms formerly owned by Ralph J. Stolle, a prominent inventor, businessman and philanthropist in Warren County. The name "San Mar Gale" came from the name of his farm, and was derived from combination of the names of Stolle's daughters, Sandy, Mary Jo, and Gail. Until Stolle's death in 1996, the farm was used as a research farm for milk production. A private airport called San Mar Gale (airport code OH79) existed on the farm until the late 1990s but has since been closed.

San Mar Gale was to occupy a large portion of the area between Lebanon and Oregonia. Its approximate boundaries were Wilmington Road to the south; North Nixon Camp Road, Emmons Road, and the Little Miami River to the east; the Wayne Township line with a small portion crossing into that township, and Shoemaker Road to the north; and Liberty-Keuter Road to the west. The planned business district was centered on the intersection of Oregonia, Emmons, and Waynesville Roads.

The planned community would have been in the Lebanon City School District. The eastern half would have been served by the Oregonia (45054) post office, and the western half served by the Lebanon (45036) post office. Telephone service would be in the Lebanon telephone exchange served by Embarq, public water was to be provided by Western Water Company, and sewer was to be constructed on site by the developers with plans for turning the operations over to Warren County or being operated as a private utility.

The community was to be partially financed by a little used program called "new community authority", which allowed cost of infrastructure to be added to the property taxes of the homeowners in the development.
