= Landen (disambiguation) =

Landen may refer to:

== Places ==
- Landen, a municipality in Belgium
- Landen, Ohio, a centre of population in the United States

== People ==
- Bill Landen (born 1956), member of the Wyoming Senate
- Dinsdale Landen (1932–2003), British television actor
- John Landen (1719–1790), English mathematician
- Ludwig Landen (1908–1985), German Olympic canoer
- Steve Landen (1952–2017), American bridge player

== See also ==
- London (disambiguation)
