= Rossburg (disambiguation) =

Rossburg may refer to:

- Rossburg, Indiana, an unincorporated community
- Rossburg, Minnesota, an unincorporated community
- Rossburg, Ohio, a village in Darke County
- Rossburg, Warren County, Ohio, an unincorporated community
