= Kenricksville, Ohio =

Unincorporated community in Ohio, U.S.

Kenricksville
- Unincorporated community
- Location within Ohio
- Coordinates: 39°33′04″N 84°09′56″W
- Country: United States
- State: Ohio
- County: Warren
- Township: Clearcreek

Kenricksville is an unincorporated community located at the intersection of Ohio State Routes 48 and 73 in Clearcreek Township, Warren County, Ohio, United States. The boundaries of this hamlet extend north on SR 48 to the homes located on Harlan Road and east on SR 73 to the location of the Fox Hollow Rodeo, including the Silver Spur Plaza.
