= Crosswicks =

Crosswicks or Crosswick may refer to:

In New Jersey

- Crosswicks, New Jersey, an unincorporated area within Chesterfield Township in Burlington County
- Crosswicks Creek, a tributary of the Delaware River in Burlington, Mercer and Monmouth counties

Elsewhere

- Crosswick, Ohio, an unincorporated place in central Wayne Township, Warren County
