= Pekin, Ohio =

There are several places in the U.S. state of Ohio named Pekin, including:

- Pekin, Carroll County, Ohio
- Pekin, Warren County, Ohio
