= Landen, Ohio =

- CDP
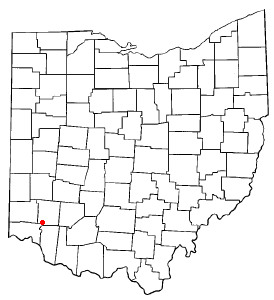
- Location of Landen, Ohio
- Coordinates: 39°18′56″N 84°16′36″W
- Country: United States
- State: Ohio
- County: Warren

Area
  - Total: 2.12 sq mi (5.49 km^{2})
  - Land: 2.03 sq mi (5.25 km^{2})
  - Water: 0.093 sq mi (0.24 km^{2})
- Elevation: 817 ft (249 m)

Population (2020)
  - Total: 6,995
  - Density: 3,449.5/sq mi (1,331.85/km^{2})
- Time zone: UTC-5 (Eastern (EST))
  - Summer (DST): UTC-4 (EDT)
- FIPS code: 39-41755
- GNIS feature ID: 2393093

Landen is a middle-class, real estate developer-created census-designated place (CDP) in Deerfield Township, Warren County, Ohio, United States. The population was 6,995 at the 2020 census. It is located around Columbia Road and Montgomery Road in the southeastern part of the township. It surrounds Twenty Mile Stand, near Fosters.

Landen was named after Theodophilus James Landen, an early Ohio settler who owned the farmland surrounding Twenty Mile Stand. The man-made “Landen Lake,” formed by creating a dam along Simpson’s Creek to create a flood retention area, is located within the residential area in a housing development. The formal place designation is "Landen Farm Drainage Lake". It is not a natural lake.

The reduction in farming activity in the immediate area of the water has reduced its importance as a water supply, although flood control is still important. The “lake” was created for flood control and to enhance the surrounding land for housing development. This water feature is sometimes used for limited, slow pontoon boat recreation, although the one-mile length limits recreational options.

It is now best described as a retention basin. The retention basin was dredged for improved flood protection with the completion in 2008 of a dredging operation that removed 184,000 cubic yards of sediment from the lake.

== Geography ==
According to the United States Census Bureau, the CDP has a total area of 4.8 square miles (12 km^{2}), of which 4.7 square miles (12 km^{2}) is land and 0.1 square miles (0.26 km^{2}) (1.68%) is water.

== Subdivisions in Landen ==
- BayWood
- BayView
- CarriageGate
- Chestnut Landing
- Cobblefield
- Creekwoods
- Gatsby Green
- Harbor Ridge
- Heatherstone
- Hickory View
- Hunter's Pointe
- The Islands
- Island Pines
- Landen Cove
- The Meadows
- Montgomery Hills
- North Cove
- North Shore
- The Orchards
- The Pointe of Landen
- Pond Woods
- RedBrick Court
- Sailboat Pointe
- South Cove
- The Trails
- Strawberry Hill
- Vineyard Court
- Woodfield

== Schools ==
- Pre-schools
  - Children's World
  - Lakeview
  - The Goddard School
- Elementary schools
  - J.F. Burns Elementary (Kings Local School District, K-4th grades)
  - Columbia Elementary (Kings Local School District, 5th-6th grades)
- Jr. High school
  - Kings Jr. High School (Kings Local School District, 7th-8th grades)
- High school
  - Kings High School
- Driving
  - Landen Driving Academy

== Landen Deerfield Park ==
Landen Deerfield Park is a 95-acre park located off U.S. Route 22 in Landen, OH. The park is home to 8 baseball fields, two playgrounds, a large lake for fishing, numerous hiking trails and a large area for soccer and football fields. The park also offers an outdoor basketball court, two tennis courts, a concession stand, restrooms and shelters, along with picnic areas and grills. The park also features and open air amphitheater for plays and concerts.

== Demographics ==
Historical population
Census	Pop.	Note	%±
2020	6,995		—
U.S. Decennial Census

As of the census of 2000, there were 12,766 people, 4,905 households, and 3,448 families residing in the CDP. The population density was 2,729.7 inhabitants per square mile (1,053.9/km^{2}). There were 5,162 housing units at an average density of 1,103.8 per square mile (426.2/km^{2}). The racial makeup of the CDP was 93.86% White, 1.48% African American, 0.09% Native American, 2.70% Asian, 0.10% Pacific Islander, 0.78% from other races, and 0.99% from two or more races. Hispanic or Latino of any race were 2.18% of the population.

There were 4,905 households, out of which 40.1% had children under the age of 18 living with them, 61.1% were married couples living together, 6.7% had a female householder with no husband present, and 29.7% were non-families. 23.5% of all households were made up of individuals, and 3.3% had someone living alone who was 65 years of age or older. The average household size was 2.60 and the average family size was 3.14.

In the CDP, the population was spread out, with 29.3% under the age of 18, 6.5% from 18 to 24, 38.7% from 25 to 44, 20.4% from 45 to 64, and 5.1% who were 65 years of age or older. The median age was 34 years. For every 100 females, there were 99.3 males. For every 100 females age 18 and over, there were 96.1 males.

The median income for a household in the CDP was $67,562, and the median income for a family was $78,236. Males had a median income of $52,446 versus $35,264 for females. The per capita income for the CDP was $32,861. About 1.2% of families and 2.5% of the population were below the poverty line, including 2.3% of those under age 18 and 1.9% of those age 65 or over.
