= Five Points, Warren County, Ohio =

Five Points, Ohio
- CDP
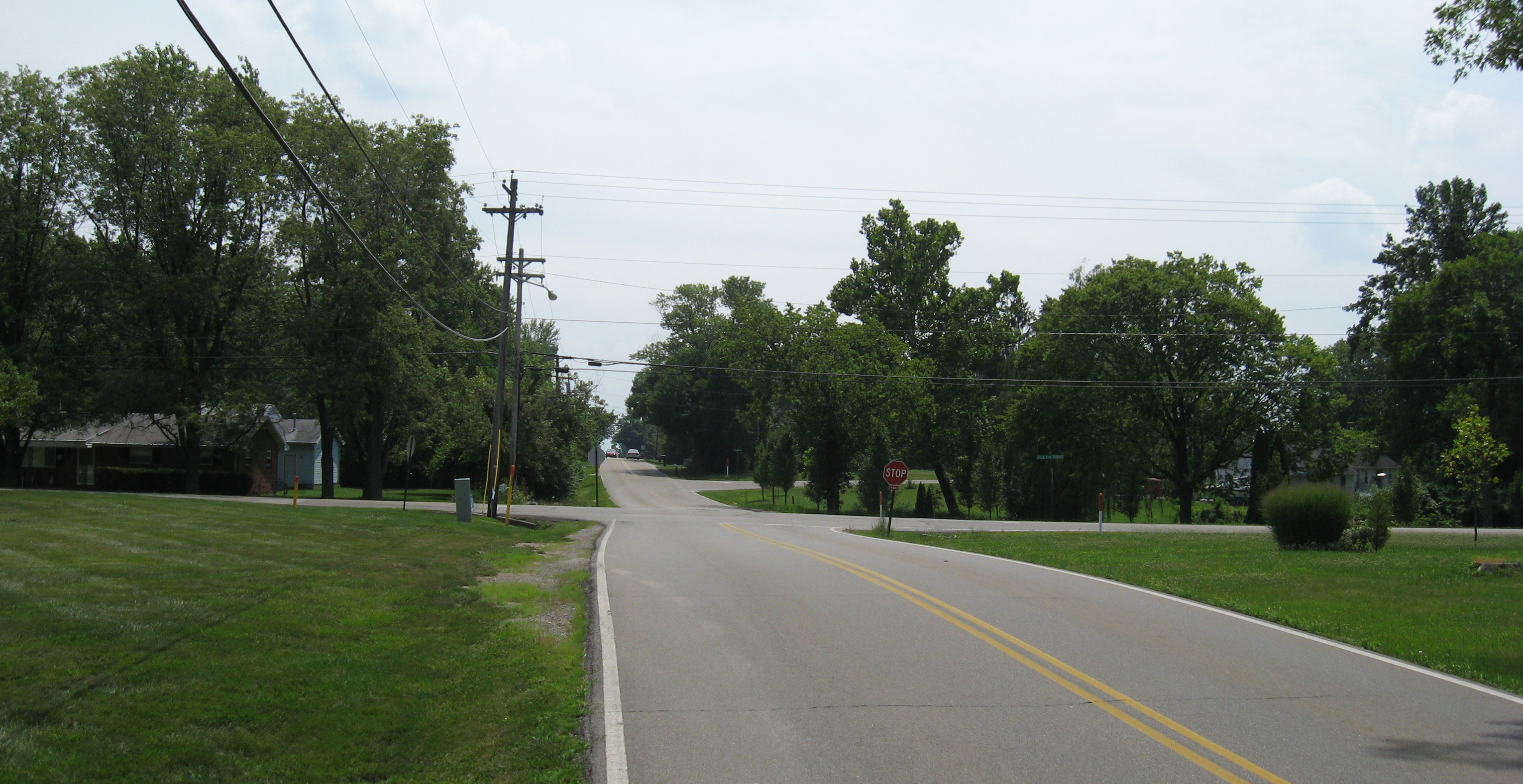
- Five Points takes its name from the near-five way intersection on the western edge of the area

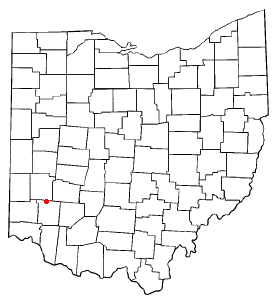
- Location of Five Points, Ohio
- Coordinates: 39°33′34″N 84°11′12″W
- Country: United States
- State: Ohio
- County: Warren

Area
  - Total: 2.06 sq mi (5.33 km^{2})
  - Land: 2.06 sq mi (5.33 km^{2})
  - Water: 0 sq mi (0.00 km^{2})
- Elevation: 991 ft (302 m)

Population (2020)
  - Total: 2,247
  - Density: 1,091.5/sq mi (421.42/km^{2})
- Time zone: UTC-5 (Eastern (EST))
  - Summer (DST): UTC-4 (EDT)
- FIPS code: 39-27303
- GNIS feature ID: 2392998

Five Points is a census-designated place (CDP) in Clearcreek Township, Warren County, Ohio, United States. The population was 2,247 at the 2020 census.

Five Points was named for the five-way crossroads at the center of the original town site.

== Geography ==
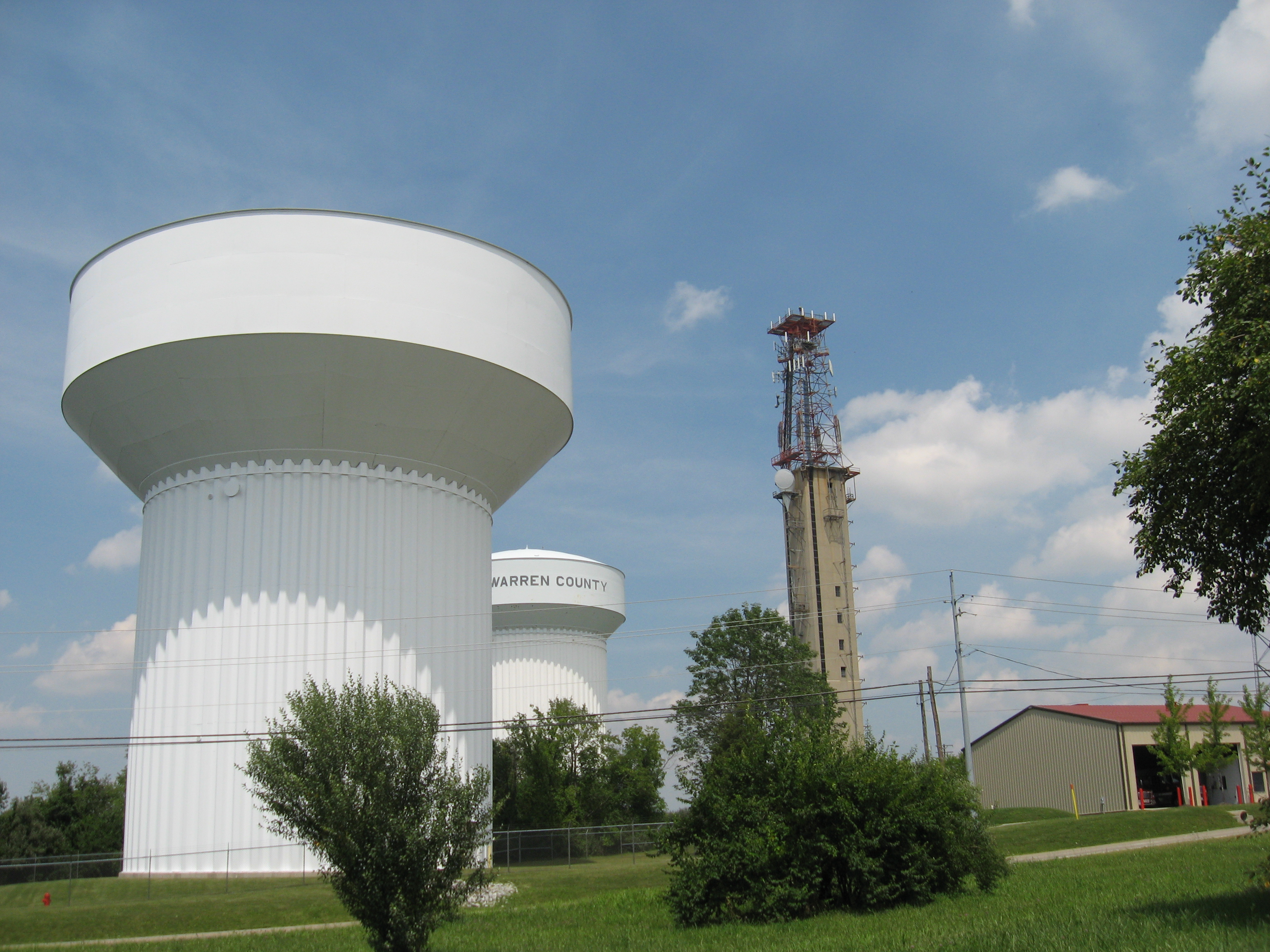
Five Points is dominated by two large water towers at the highest point in Warren County.

According to the United States Census Bureau, the CDP has a total area of 2.9 square miles (7.5 km^{2}), of which 2.9 square miles (7.5 km^{2}) is land and 0.34% is water.

== Demographics ==
Historical population
Census	Pop.	Note	%±
2020	2,247		—
U.S. Decennial Census

As of the census of 2000, there were 2,191 people, 740 households, and 660 families residing in the CDP. The population density was 759.1 inhabitants per square mile (293.1/km^{2}). There were 751 housing units at an average density of 260.2 per square mile (100.5/km^{2}). The racial makeup of the CDP was 97.76% White, 0.55% African American, 0.14% Native American, 1.19% Asian, 0.18% from other races, and 0.18% from two or more races. Hispanic or Latino of any race were 1.14% of the population.

There were 740 households, out of which 45.3% had children under the age of 18 living with them, 84.7% were married couples living together, 3.5% had a female householder with no husband present, and 10.8% were non-families. 8.0% of all households were made up of individuals, and 2.3% had someone living alone who was 65 years of age or older. The average household size was 2.96 and the average family size was 3.14.

In the CDP, the population was spread out, with 30.0% under the age of 18, 4.8% from 18 to 24, 27.6% from 25 to 44, 31.4% from 45 to 64, and 6.2% who were 65 years of age or older. The median age was 39 years. For every 100 females, there were 109.3 males. For every 100 females age 18 and over, there were 105.4 males.

The median income for a household in the CDP was $107,925, and the median income for a family was $111,888. Males had a median income of $81,092 versus $50,700 for females. The per capita income for the CDP was $38,505. None of the families and 0.3% of the population were living below the poverty line, including no under eighteens and none of those over 64.
