= Corwin, Ohio =

- Village
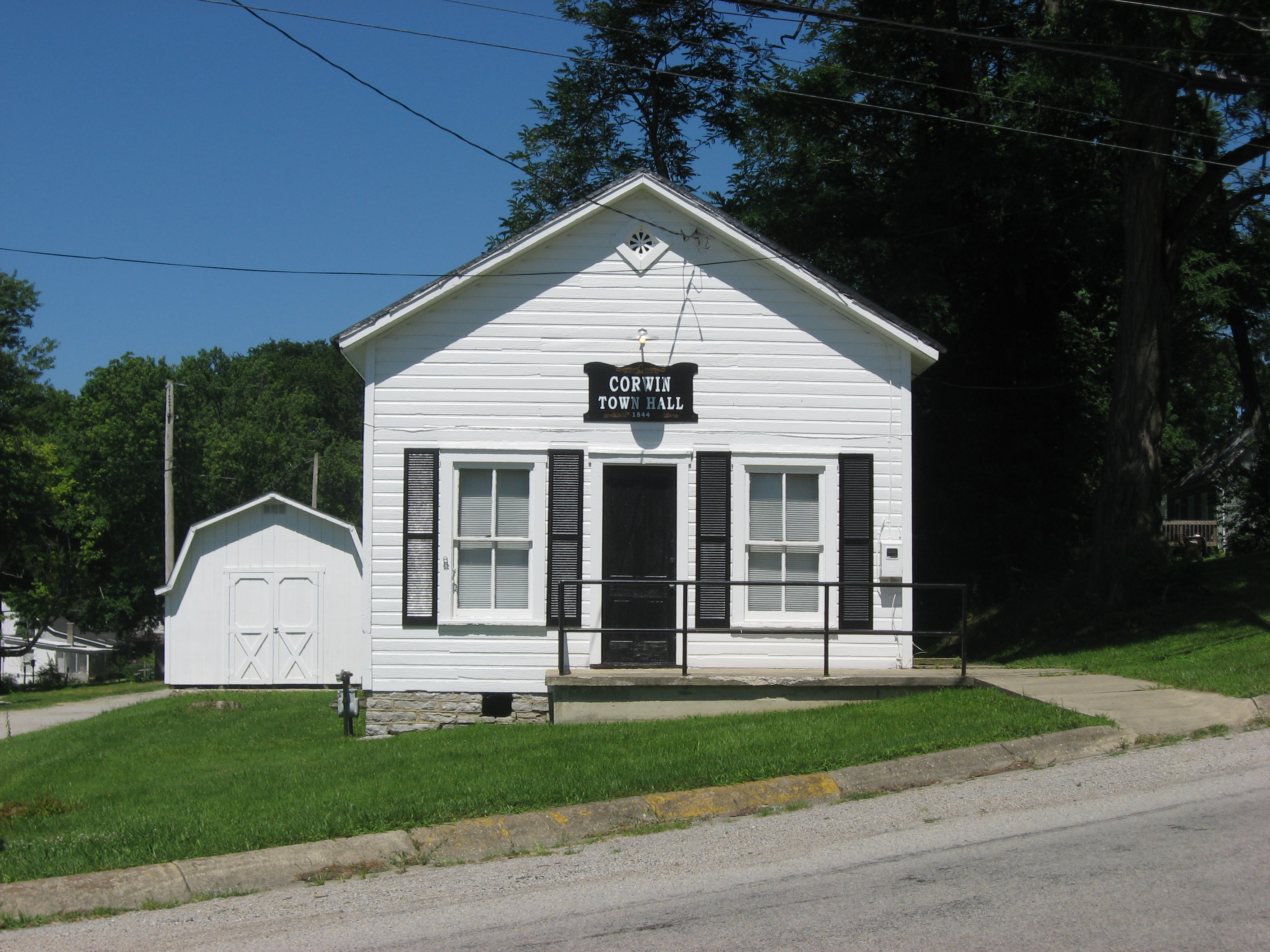
- Corwin Council House and Jail

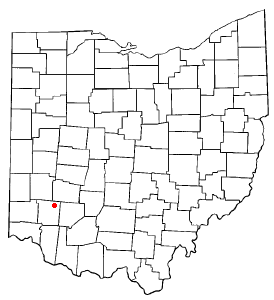
- Location of Corwin, Ohio

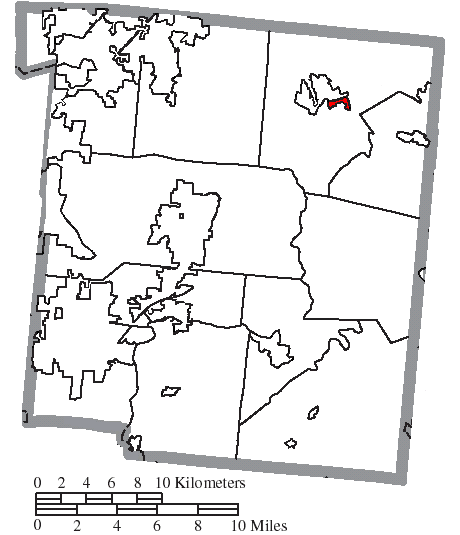
- Location of Corwin in Warren County
- Coordinates: 39°31′32″N 84°03′56″W
- Country: United States
- State: Ohio
- County: Warren

Area
  - Total: 0.33 sq mi (0.85 km^{2})
  - Land: 0.33 sq mi (0.85 km^{2})
  - Water: 0 sq mi (0.00 km^{2})
- Elevation: 840 ft (260 m)

Population (2020)
  - Total: 484
  - Estimate (2023): 516
  - Density: 1,470.0/sq mi (567.57/km^{2})
- Time zone: UTC-5 (Eastern (EST))
  - Summer (DST): UTC-4 (EDT)
- ZIP code: 45068
- Area code: 513
- FIPS code: 39-18840
- GNIS feature ID: 2398632
- Website: https://corwinohio.us/

Corwin is a village in Wayne Township, Warren County, Ohio, United States. The population was 484 at the 2020 census.

== History ==
Corwin began as a depot on the Little Miami Railroad. A post office called Corwin was established in 1898, and remained in operation until 1918. The village is named for Thomas Corwin, 15th Governor of Ohio.

== Geography ==
According to the United States Census Bureau, the village has a total area of 0.35 square miles (0.91 km^{2}), all land.

== Demographics ==
Historical population
Census	Pop.	Note	%±
1870	135		—
1880	188		39.3%
1900	131		—
1910	146		11.5%
1920	136		−6.8%
1930	138		1.5%
1940	163		18.1%
1950	326		100.0%
1960	447		37.1%
1970	346		−22.6%
1980	276		−20.2%
1990	225		−18.5%
2000	256		13.8%
2010	421		64.5%
2020	484		15.0%
2023 (est.)	516	▲	6.6%
U.S. Decennial Census

=== 2010 census ===
As of the census of 2010, there were 421 people, 177 households, and 131 families living in the village. The population density was 1,202.9 inhabitants per square mile (464.4/km^{2}). There were 190 housing units at an average density of 542.9 per square mile (209.6/km^{2}). The racial makeup of the village was 98.8% White and 1.2% from other races. Hispanic or Latino of any race were 1.9% of the population.

There were 177 households, of which 31.1% had children under the age of 18 living with them, 62.7% were married couples living together, 6.8% had a female householder with no husband present, 4.5% had a male householder with no wife present, and 26.0% were non-families. 20.9% of all households were made up of individuals, and 8.5% had someone living alone who was 65 years of age or older. The average household size was 2.38 and the average family size was 2.76.

The median age in the village was 42.6 years. 21.1% of residents were under the age of 18; 6% were between the ages of 18 and 24; 27.2% were from 25 to 44; 28.1% were from 45 to 64; and 17.8% were 65 years of age or older. The gender makeup of the village was 53.9% male and 46.1% female.

=== 2000 census ===
As of the census of 2000, there were 256 people, 100 households, and 83 families living in the village. The population density was 855.6 inhabitants per square mile (330.3/km^{2}). There were 111 housing units at an average density of 371.0 per square mile (143.2/km^{2}). The racial makeup of the village was 99.61% White and 0.39% Asian.

There were 100 households, out of which 30.0% had children under the age of 18 living with them, 70.0% were married couples living together, 7.0% had a female householder with no husband present, and 17.0% were non-families. 16.0% of all households were made up of individuals, and 4.0% had someone living alone who was 65 years of age or older. The average household size was 2.56 and the average family size was 2.81.

In the village, the population was spread out, with 20.7% under the age of 18, 6.3% from 18 to 24, 35.5% from 25 to 44, 25.0% from 45 to 64, and 12.5% who were 65 years of age or older. The median age was 37 years. For every 100 females there were 100.0 males. For every 100 females age 18 and over, there were 99.0 males.

The median income for a household in the village was $51,875, and the median income for a family was $50,000. Males had a median income of $28,625 versus $20,833 for females. The per capita income for the village was $18,414. About 6.8% of families and 11.2% of the population were below the poverty line, including 16.3% of those under the age of eighteen and none of those 65 or over.

== Public services ==
All of the village is in the Wayne Local School District. Mail is delivered through the Waynesville post office and telephone service is provided through the Waynesville exchange.
