= Harveysburg, Ohio =

- Village
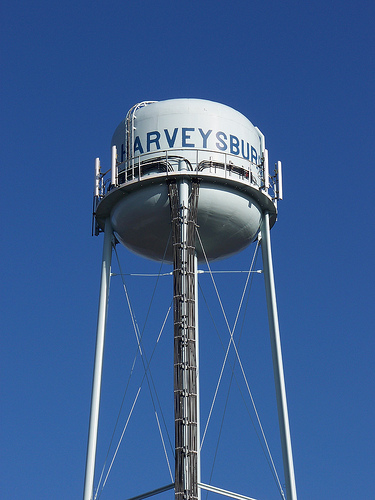
- Water tower
- Nickname: Village on the lake
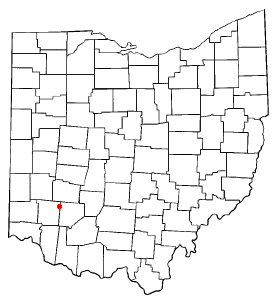
- Location of Harveysburg, Ohio

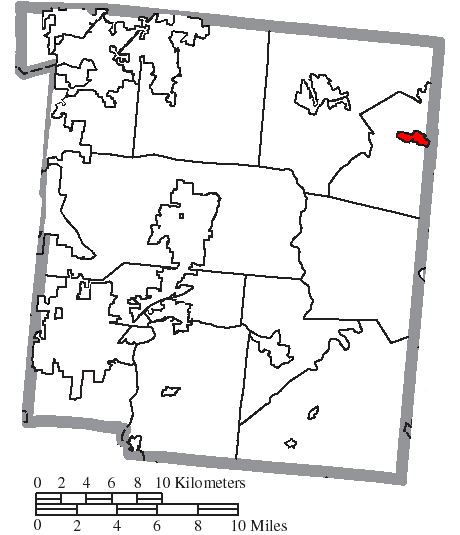
- Location of Harveysburg in Warren County
- Coordinates: 39°30′04″N 84°00′23″W
- Country: United States
- State: Ohio
- County: Warren
- Founded: 1829
- Established: 1831
- Village: 1844

Government
  - Type: Council-city manager
  - Mayor: Jonathan Funk

Area
  - Total: 1.02 sq mi (2.64 km^{2})
  - Land: 0.99 sq mi (2.57 km^{2})
  - Water: 0.023 sq mi (0.06 km^{2})
- Elevation: 912 ft (278 m)

Population (2020)
  - Total: 554
  - Estimate (2023): 569
  - Density: 557.3/sq mi (215.19/km^{2})
- Time zone: UTC-5 (Eastern (EST))
  - Summer (DST): UTC-4 (EDT)
- ZIP code: 45032
- Area code: 513
- FIPS code: 39-34384
- GNIS feature ID: 2398262
- Website: www.villageofharveysburg.org

Harveysburg is a village in Massie Township, Warren County, Ohio, United States. The population was 554 at the 2020 census. It is best known as the home of the Ohio Renaissance Festival.

== History ==
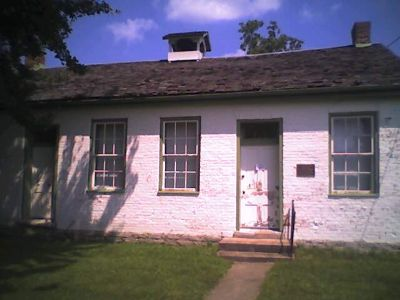
Harveysburg Free Negro School

Harveysburg was platted in 1829 by William Harvey, and named for him. Ardent abolitionists, the Harvey family established the Harvey Free Negro School in 1831. A post office has been in operation at Harveysburg since 1839.

== Geography ==
According to the United States Census Bureau, the village has a total area of 1.01 square miles (2.62 km^{2}), of which 0.99 square miles (2.56 km^{2}) is land and 0.02 square miles (0.05 km^{2}) is water. It is located along part of the eastern shore of Caesar Creek Lake.

== Demographics ==
Historical population
Census	Pop.	Note	%±
1830	99		—
1850	329		—
1860	445		35.3%
1870	388		−12.8%
1880	539		38.9%
1890	402		−25.4%
1900	435		8.2%
1910	359		−17.5%
1920	355		−1.1%
1930	361		1.7%
1940	354		−1.9%
1950	477		34.7%
1960	514		7.8%
1970	486		−5.4%
1980	425		−12.6%
1990	437		2.8%
2000	563		28.8%
2010	546		−3.0%
2020	554		1.5%
2023 (est.)	569	▲	2.7%
U.S. Decennial Census

=== 2010 census ===
As of the census of 2010, there were 546 people, 204 households, and 147 families living in the village. The population density was 551.5 inhabitants per square mile (212.9/km^{2}). There were 237 housing units at an average density of 239.4 per square mile (92.4/km^{2}). The racial makeup of the village was 95.1% White, 1.5% African American, 0.4% Asian, 0.2% from other races, and 2.9% from two or more races. Hispanic or Latino of any race were 0.2% of the population.

There were 204 households, of which 37.3% had children under the age of 18 living with them, 57.8% were married couples living together, 7.4% had a female householder with no husband present, 6.9% had a male householder with no wife present, and 27.9% were non-families. 20.6% of all households were made up of individuals, and 5.9% had someone living alone who was 65 years of age or older. The average household size was 2.68 and the average family size was 3.08.

The median age in the village was 37.3 years. 26.4% of residents were under the age of 18; 5.9% were between the ages of 18 and 24; 27.1% were from 25 to 44; 31.4% were from 45 to 64; and 9.3% were 65 years of age or older. The gender makeup of the village was 51.1% male and 48.9% female.

=== 2000 census ===
As of the census of 2000, there were 563 people, 191 households, and 152 families living in the village. The population density was 857.1 inhabitants per square mile (330.9/km^{2}). There were 208 housing units at an average density of 316.7 per square mile (122.3/km^{2}). The racial makeup of the village was 96.45% White, 2.13% African American, 0.18% Asian, 0.18% from other races, and 1.07% from two or more races. Hispanic or Latino of any race were 1.95% of the population.

There were 191 households, out of which 45.5% had children under the age of 18 living with them, 62.8% were married couples living together, 13.1% had a female householder with no husband present, and 19.9% were non-families. 14.7% of all households were made up of individuals, and 4.7% had someone living alone who was 65 years of age or older. The average household size was 2.95 and the average family size was 3.29.

In the village, the population was spread out, with 32.3% under the age of 18, 7.8% from 18 to 24, 32.7% from 25 to 44, 19.4% from 45 to 64, and 7.8% who were 65 years of age or older. The median age was 31 years. For every 100 females there were 94.1 males. For every 100 females age 18 and over, there were 92.4 males.

The median income for a household in the village was $44,750, and the median income for a family was $49,063. Males had a median income of $31,923 versus $23,333 for females. The per capita income for the village was $16,918. About 7.7% of families and 8.6% of the population were below the poverty line, including 8.4% of those under age 18 and none of those age 65 or over.

== Notable people ==
- Kersey Graves - skeptic, atheist, spiritualist, theological reformist, and writer
- Donald Edgar "Buz" Lukens - Republican member of the U.S. House of Representatives from Ohio
- Jennie McCowen - physician, writer, lecturer, medical journal editor, suffragist

== Gallery ==
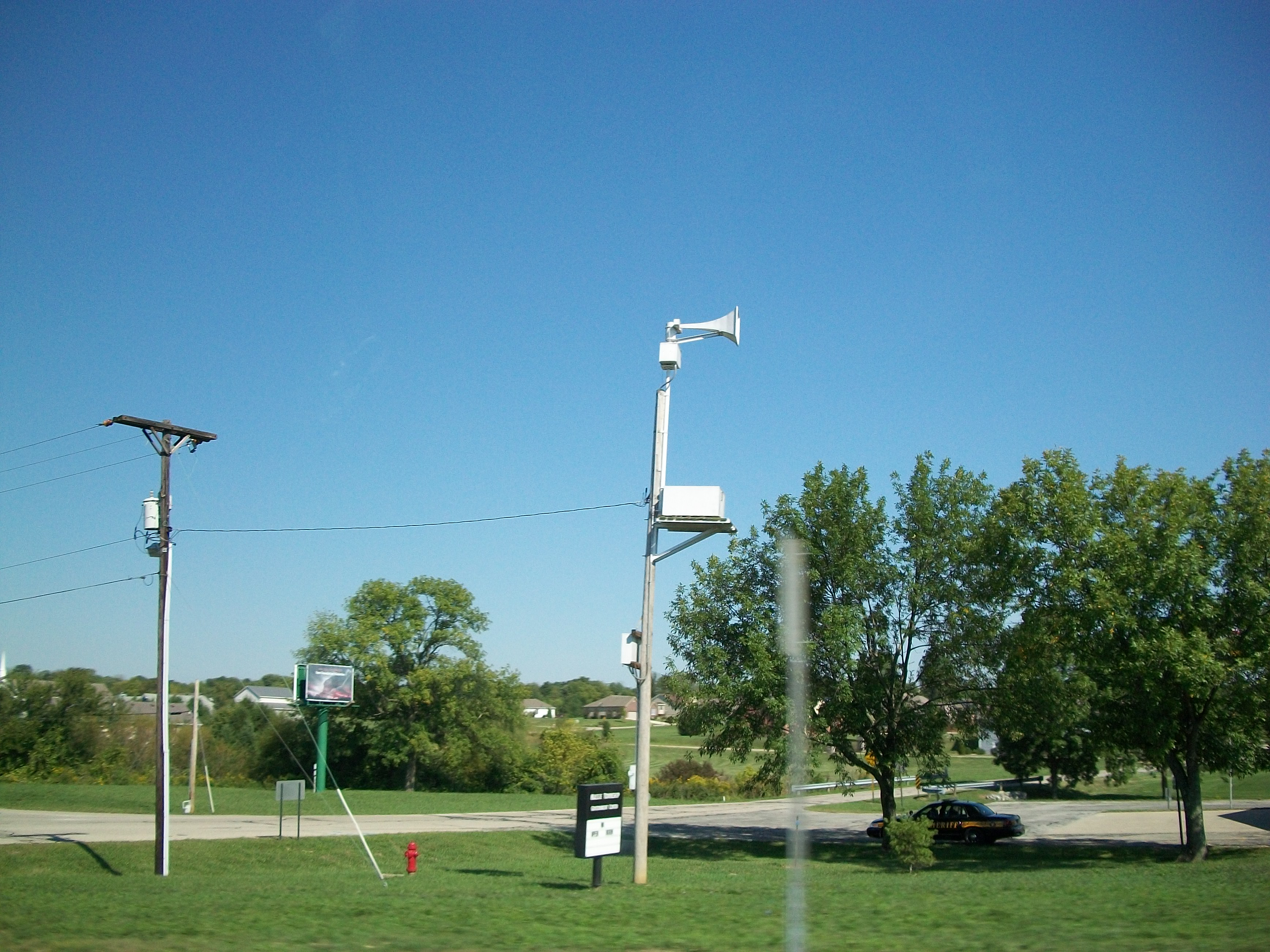
Federal Thunderbolt 1003 Tornado siren located at the Massie Township fire department in Harveysburg, Ohio.

== See also ==
- Thunderbolt siren
