= Beedles Station, Ohio =

Ghost town in Ohio, United States

Coordinates: 39.4384°N 84.2798°W

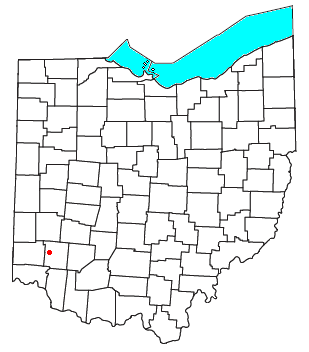
Location of Beedles Station, Ohio

Beedles Station is an extinct town in Warren County, Ohio, United States.

== History ==
It was the first settlement in the county, before Warren County was established. A blockhouse was established there in 1795 in what is now Section 28, Town 4, Range 3 of the Between the Miami Rivers Survey in western Turtlecreek Township. This is on the west side of State Route 741 about a mile south of Otterbein. The settlement was named for William Beedle, an early settler. A historical plaque marks the site.
