= Twenty Mile Stand, Ohio =

Unincorporated community in Ohio, U.S.

Coordinates: 39°18′23″N 84°16′48″W

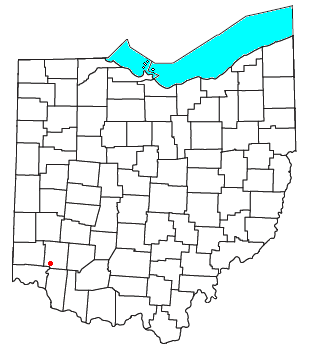
Location of Twenty Mile Stand, Ohio

Twenty Mile Stand is an unincorporated community in southeastern Deerfield Township, Warren County, Ohio, United States. It lies on the old 3C Highway in Town 4 East, Range 2 North, Section 21 of the Symmes Purchase and in the center of the area known as "Landen". It is about three miles south-south west of Kings Mills, two miles southwest of Fosters, and twenty miles northeast of Cincinnati.

A post office called Twenty Mile Stand was established in 1819, the name was changed to Twentymile Stand in 1895, and the post office closed in 1904. In the 19th century, the town was a stagecoach stop 20 miles (32 km) from downtown Cincinnati, hence the name. In April 2013, the original stagecoach stop, known as the Twenty Mile House, was demolished and replaced with a modern strip mall and gas station. The house had been a fine and casual restaurant, bar and tavern for generations.
