= Clear Creek (Great Miami River tributary) =

Creek in Ohio, United States

Coordinates: 39°32′59″N 84°19′50″W

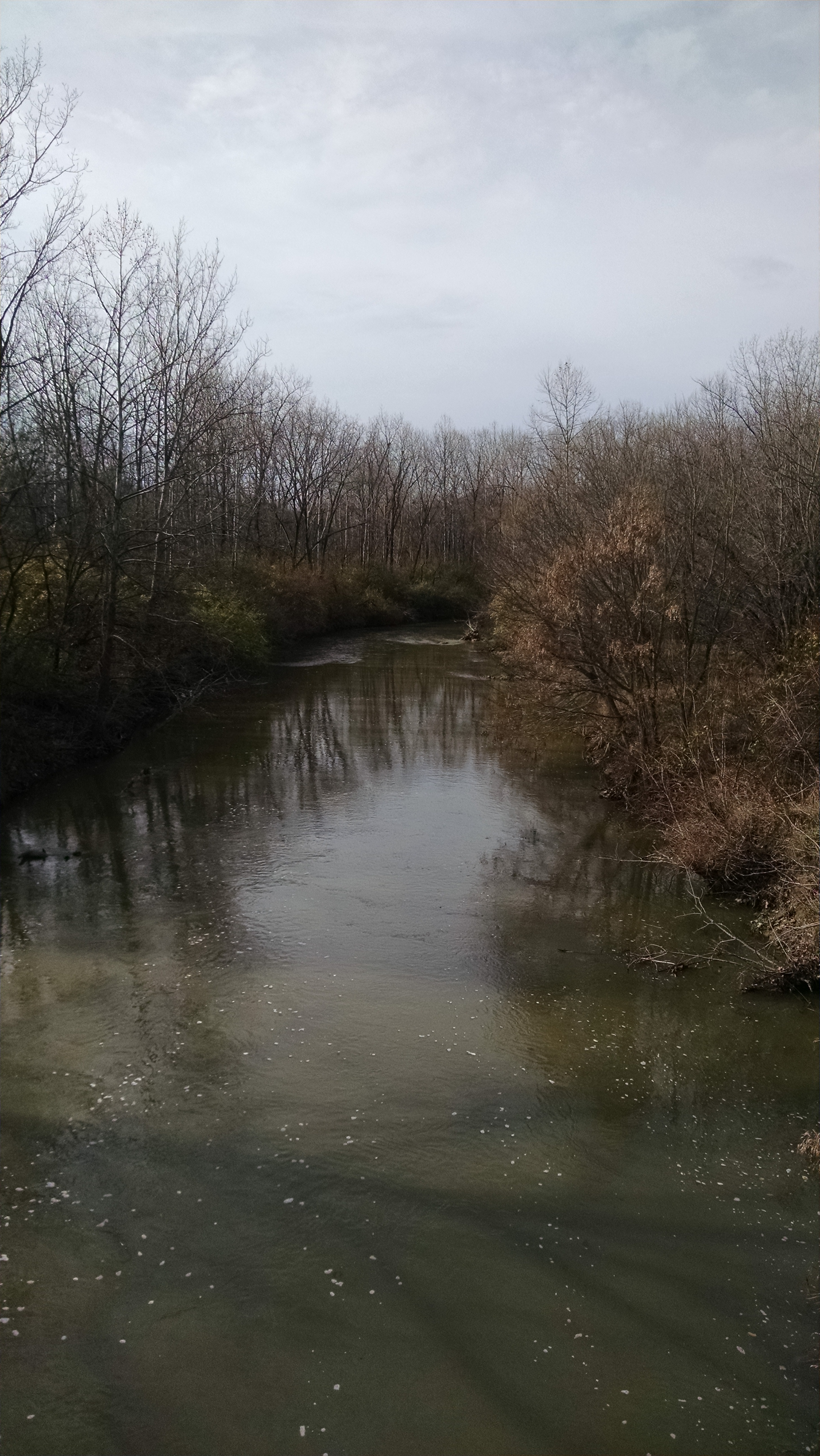
Clear Creek, about 100 meters before its confluence with the Great Miami River in Franklin, Ohio.

Clear Creek is a tributary of the Great Miami River in southwestern Ohio. The creek forms in the southeastern portion of Clearcreek Township (Near Old 122 Rd), with major tributaries including (from east to west) Mad Run, Beech Run, Bull Run, Richards Run, Twin Creek, Gander Run, Goose Run, and Dearth Run. The watershed includes the highest point in Warren County east of Five Points (elevation 1,055 feet). It drains most of Clearcreek Township, Springboro, Ohio, much of Franklin Township, and then discharges into the Great Miami River in Franklin, Ohio.

Clear Creek was so named on account of the clear quality of its water. The creek lends its name to Clearcreek Township in Warren County.

Clear creek passes under East Pekin Rd, East Lower Springboro Road, Red Lion 5 Points Rd, Weidner Rd, Shaker Rd, Dixie Hwy, Ohio State Route 741, (South Main street in Springboro) Ohio State Route 48 (In Clearcreek Township) Interstate 75, and Ohio State Route 73. (In Franklin as Riley Blvd)
