= Jennie McCowen =

American physician, writer, lecturer, medical journal editor, suffragist

Jennie McCowen M.D.
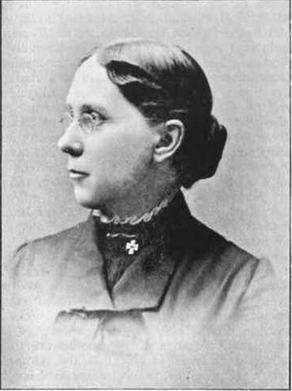
- Photo in Physicians and Surgeons of America, 1896
- Born: June 15, 1845; Harveysburg, Ohio, U.S.
- Died: July 28, 1924 (aged 79)
- Education: University of Iowa
- Occupations: Physician, writer, editor
- Medical career
- Sub-specialties: nervous diseases and diseases of women

Jennie McCowen (June 15, 1845 – July 28, 1924) was an American physician, writer, and medical journal editor. She lectured on and supported woman's suffrage.

== Early life and education ==
Jennie C. McCowen was born on June 15, 1845 in Harveysburg, Ohio. She was the daughter of Dr. John and Maria (Taylor) McCowen.

McCowen was educated in the public schools of her native town and the normal school. She earned a Master of Arts degree from the Ohio Normal School, in 1883, having taught school for twelve years, beginning at the age of sixteen.

In 1869, McCowen was nominated for county superintendent of schools in Audubon County, Iowa, and lacked but fifteen votes in an election. In 1873, having accumulated enough money to pursue a professional education, she began to study medicine under the preceptorship of William Stephenson Robertson, M.D., at the State University of Iowa in Iowa City. There, she attended three courses of lectures, and graduated with honors on March 4, 1876, receiving a prize for her thesis on puerperal fever. While an undergraduate, McCowen was offered the position of assistant physician on the staff of the State Hospital for the Insane in Mt. Pleasant, Iowa, and assumed the position immediately after graduation.

== Career ==
=== Physician ===
In 1880, McCowen resigned from her role at the State Hospital for the Insane and moved to Davenport, Iowa, where she began specializing in nervous diseases and diseases of women. The same year, she became an attending physician at the Cook Home for Aged Women. In 1892, McCowen became chief of staff of the Woman's Hospital in Davenport, and served on the adjunct staff of Mercy Hospital from 1893 to 1894. In 1894, she became president of the medical board of the Iowa State Nursery of the Children's Home Society, located in Davenport. McCowen ran the Hadlai Heights Women's Hospital with Eliza "Lile" Bickford.

At the 1893 World's Columbian Exposition in Chicago, McCowen represented Iowa in the Congress on Woman's Progress, in May; delivered an address on “Progress in Child-Saving Work” in the Congress on Social and Moral Reform, in June; she spoke on “Prevention of Impurity among Children”, in August; and was a member of the executive committee on the International Congress of Medical Jurisprudence. She also spoke on “The Postal Rights of the Insane” in the same month. At the World's Congress on Geology, she read a paper on “Crinoids,” illustrated with specimens from the Davenport Academy of Sciences, which address attracted much attention and a copy of it was requested by the British Museum, London, and Johns Hopkins University, Baltimore, Maryland. At the congresses in the Woman's Building, in October, she spoke upon “The Child Problem of To-day.” McCowen was also a member of the jury of awards of the World's Columbian Exposition, in the department of medical and surgical appliances, artificial limbs, sanitary exhibits, and others.

=== Society memberships ===
McCowen was a Scott County, Iowa Medical Society member, serving as its secretary from 1880 to 1882, president from 1883 to 1884, and treasurer beginning in 1885. She was also a member of the Iowa and Illinois District Medical Society, the Iowa State Medical Society, the American Medical Association, the Pan-American Medical Congress, and the Iowa Public Health Association. She became the third woman to be elected a member of the Medico-Legal Society of New York in 1885, and became vice president of the society in 1888; was a vice president of the International Congress of Medical Jurisprudence, New York, 1889; represented the state of Iowa at the annual meetings of the National Conference of Charities and Correction since 1882, and was secretary for Iowa, 1882–92; was a member of the Davenport Academy of Natural Sciences, twice president, 1889–90, and a member of its publication committee beginning in 1890; of the American Association for the Advancement of Science; of the National Science Club; and of the American Association for the Extension of University Teaching. In 1889, she was made a fellow of the Society of Science, Letters, and Art.

=== Author and editor ===
McCowen wrote for various publications as follows: “Prevention of Insanity"; “Relations and Duties of the General Profession toward Insanity"; “Psychiatry in Iowa"; “Suicide"; “Plan for State Care of Chronic Insane", which was, by request of the Iowa State Medical Society, embodied in a memorial to the legislature; “Insanity in Women"; “Inebriety: Is It a Disease?”; “Heredity"; “Women Physicians in Hospitals for Insane"; “Classification of Mental Diseases as a Basis of International Statistics"; as well as “Shinbone Alley", an appeal for preventive work among children. She was also the author of papers on “Vis Medicatrix Naturae"; “Puerperal Fever"; “Heredity and Intemperance"; “Hospital Treatment for Insane Women"; “Physiology and Hygiene of Womanhood", (a course of six lectures to women, 1865) “Dr. Johnson: a Psychological Study"; “Women's Work in Iowa"; “The Relations of Intemperance to Insanity"; “Relations of Intemperance to Heredity"; “Inebriety in Women", in two series; “Contributions to the Study of Epilepsy"; “The Use and Abuse of Narcotics"; “Heredity in Its Relation to Charity Work"; “Overcoming Evil Inheritance"; “The Press as a Factor in Reformatory Movements"; “Legal Protection For Girls"; “Earthquakes"; “The Relation of Academies of Science to the Community"; “Early History of the Iowa Orphan's Home"; “Occupations and Amusements for Insane Women"; “Provision for Feeble-Minded Children"; "Suicide in Its Relation to Mental Unsoundness"; “Child-Saving Work in the United States"; “Child-Saving Work in Foreign Fields", a series of twelve papers; "The Child and the State"; “The Utility of State Boards of Charity"; “Charity Organization in Cities"; “Health Talks", being a series of six annual talks to working girls and women of Davenport, under the auspices of the Lend-a-Hand Club, 1888–94; and “Emergency Lectures", two series of five lectures each to women on accidents or “What to Do Until the Doctor Comes", 1890.

McCowen was a collaborator in obstetrics of the Iowa Medical Journal, beginning April 1, 1895, and was associate editor of the Iowa State Medical Recorder, 1886–90. By 1905, she served as State Medicine editor of the Woman's Medical Journal.

== Personal life ==
McCowen was a suffragist, and devoted much time to the study of preventive work in social science. She aided in the organization of cooperative working girls' clubs; was a member of the Association for Advancement of Women since 1881, and its vice-president for Iowa, 1883–85; and took an active part in the Woman's Congress, Des Moines, Iowa, 1885. She was chairman of the executive committee, and from 1893, was president of the Woman's Alliance, which secured for Davenport a police matron, in 1890. She was a co-founder of Lend-a-Hand Club and helped establish the Charitable Alliance of Women.

Bickford was McCowen's longtime companion. Later, McCowen lived with Clara Craine, who was the head of the Visiting Nurse Association. McCowen died on July 28, 1924, and was buried in Davenport's Oakdale Cemetery.

== Selected works ==
- Relations and Duties of the General Profession Toward Insanity, 1883
- Insanity in women, 1886
- Women physicians in hospitals for the insane : an historical retrospect, 1886
