= Murdoch, Ohio =

Unincorporated community in Ohio, U.S.

Coordinates: 39°17′31″N 84°12′22″W

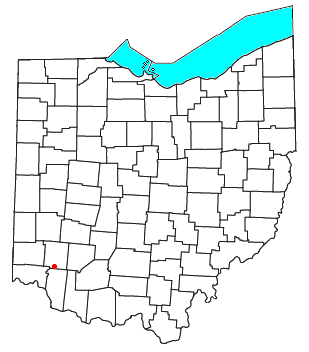
Location of Murdoch, Ohio

Murdoch (sometimes spelled Murdock) is an unincorporated community in southern Hamilton Township, Warren County, Ohio, United States. It is located about two miles southeast of Maineville and two miles northwest of Cozaddale.

A post office called Murdock was established in 1866, the name was changed to Murdoch in 1898, and the post office closed in 1902. The community was named for Professor James E. Murdoch, an early settler.
