= Wayne Township, Warren County, Ohio =

Township in Ohio, US

- Township
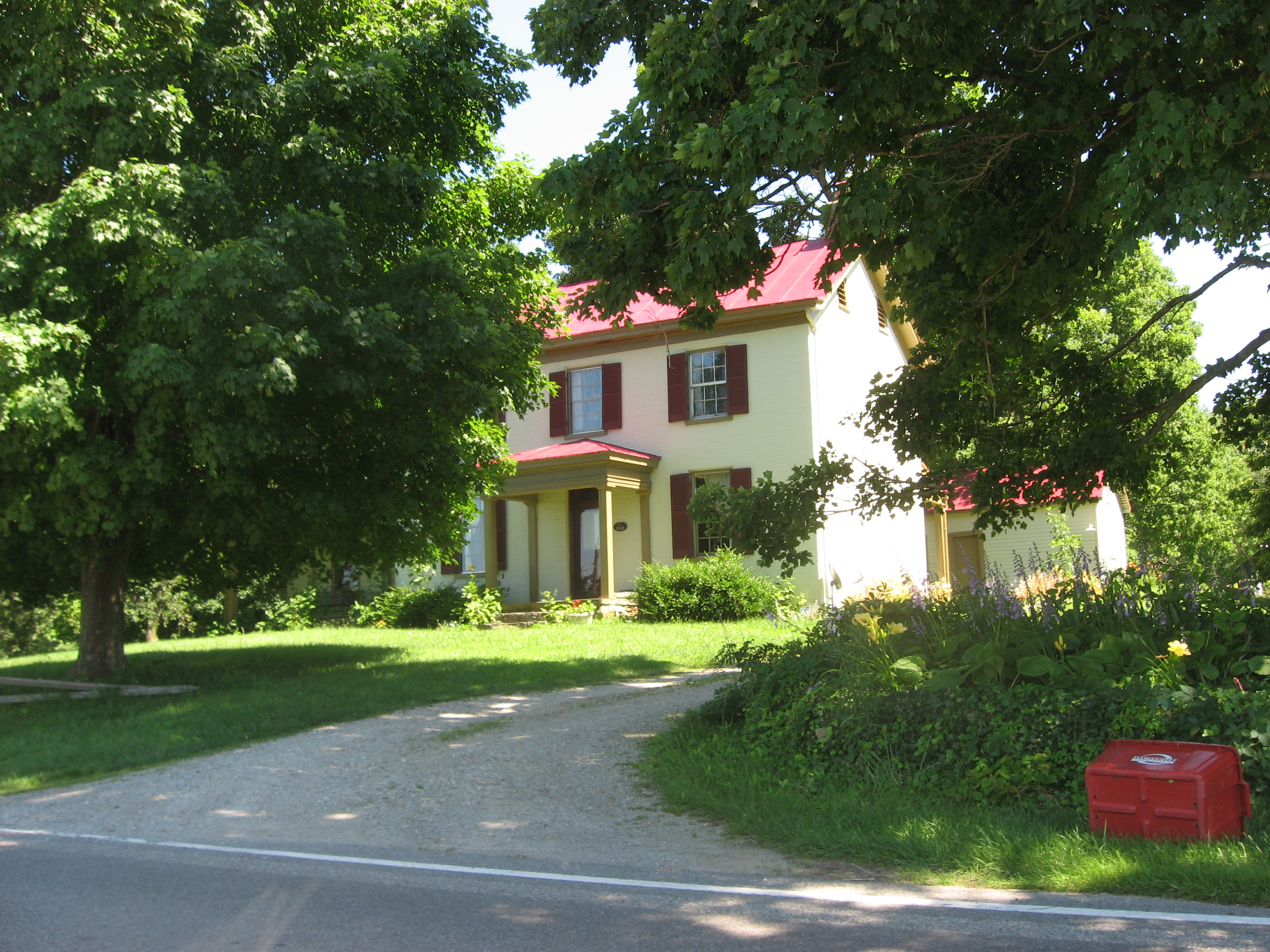
- Moses McKay House, built 1818

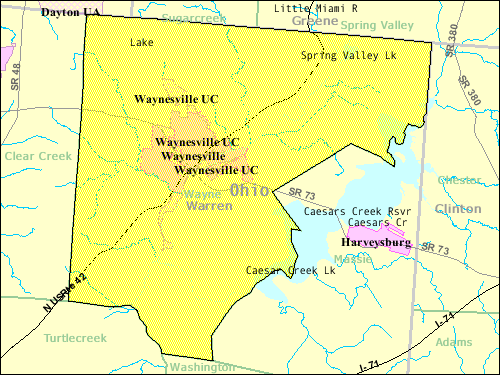
- Detailed map of Wayne Township
- Coordinates: 39°31′46″N 84°4′55″W
- Country: United States
- State: Ohio
- County: Warren

Area
  - Total: 46.3 sq mi (120.0 km^{2})
  - Land: 44.8 sq mi (116.1 km^{2})
  - Water: 1.5 sq mi (3.9 km^{2})
- Elevation: 720 ft (220 m)

Population (2020)
  - Total: 8,658
  - Density: 162/sq mi (62.4/km^{2})
- Time zone: UTC-5 (Eastern (EST))
  - Summer (DST): UTC-4 (EDT)
- FIPS code: 39-82306
- GNIS feature ID: 1087123
- Website: https://www.waynetownship.us/

Wayne Township is one of the eleven townships of Warren County, Ohio, United States. It is located in the northeast part of the county and includes the village of Waynesville, Ohio. The population was 8,658 at the 2020 census. Caesar Creek State Park is located in the township.

== Geography ==
Located in the northeastern corner of the county, it borders the following townships:

- Sugarcreek Township, Greene County - north
- Spring Valley Township, Greene County - northeast
- Chester Township, Clinton County - east
- Massie Township - southeast
- Washington Township - south
- Turtlecreek Township - southwest
- Clearcreek Township - west
- Washington Township, Montgomery County - northwest

The villages of Corwin and Waynesville in the township, as are the communities of Dodds, Mount Holly and Crosswick. The Little Miami River, which forms a portion of the township's boundary, flows through the middle of the township. The Little Miami Bike Trail, along the route of the former Little Miami Railroad, also passes through the township.

The portion of Wayne Township east of the Little Miami is in the Virginia Military District and was surveyed with the metes and bounds system, while the area west of the Little Miami was surveyed on the same plan as used in the Symmes Purchase.

== Name and history ==
Named for General "Mad" Anthony Wayne, it is one of twenty Wayne Townships in Ohio.

One of the original townships of Warren County, Wayne Township was organized on May 10, 1803.

== Government ==
The township is governed by a three-member board of trustees, who are elected in November of odd-numbered years to a four-year term beginning on the following January 1. Two are elected in the year after the presidential election and one is elected in the year before it. There is also an elected township fiscal officer, who serves a four-year term beginning on April 1 of the year after the election, which is held in November of the year before the presidential election. Vacancies in the fiscal officership or on the board of trustees are filled by the remaining trustees.

== Public services ==
Most of the township is in the Wayne Local School District, but parts are in the Lebanon, Spring Valley, Clinton Massie and Xenia districts.

The township is mainly in the Waynesville telephone exchange, but parts are in the Spring Valley, Bellbrook, Lebanon, and Centerville exchanges.
