= Ohio Renaissance Festival =

Annual festival in Warren County, Ohio

Coordinates: 39°30′0″N 83°59′15″W

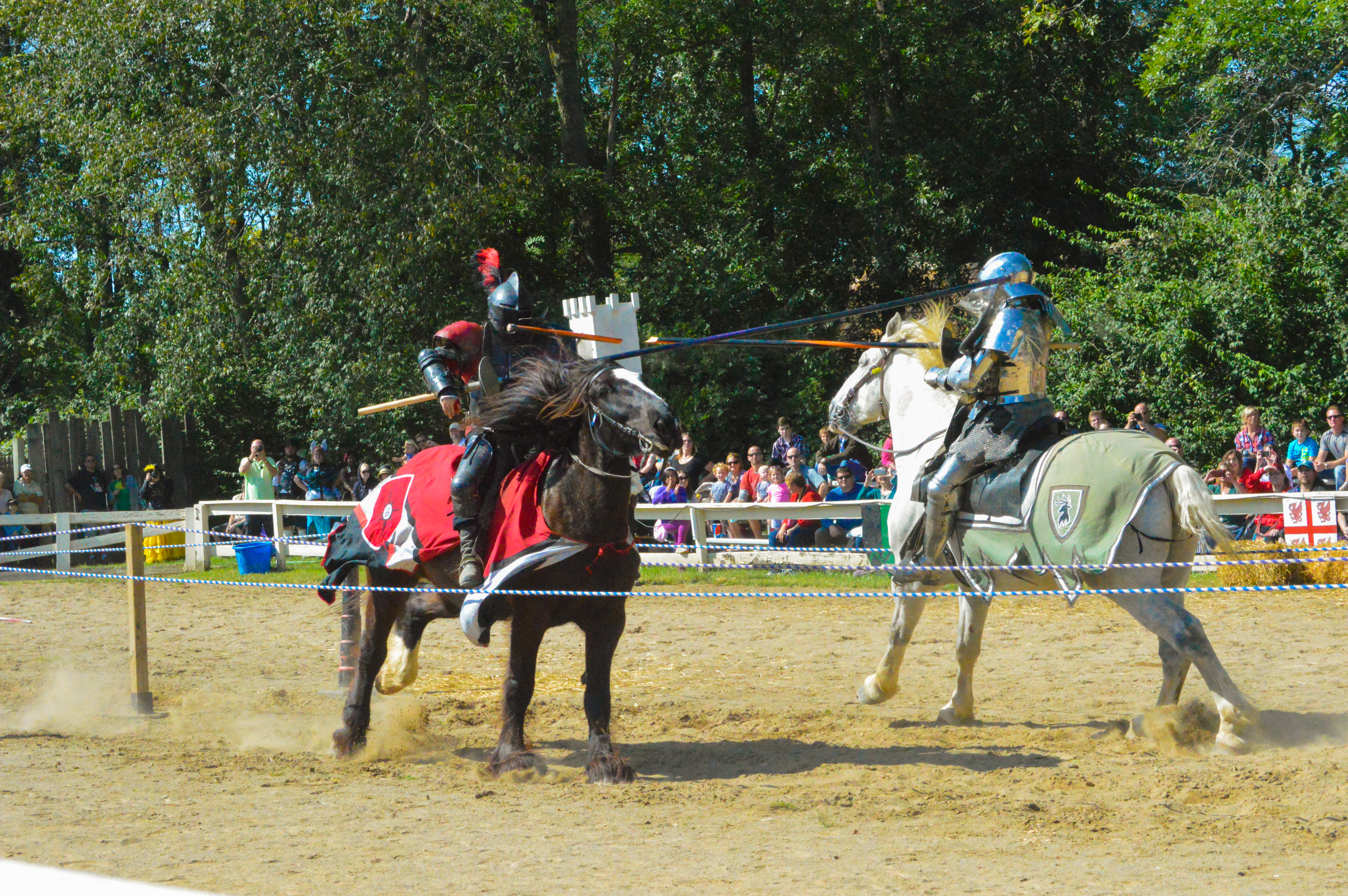
- Ohio Renaissance Festival in 2014
- Genre: Renaissance fair
- Dates: August - October
- Locations: Harveysburg, Ohio
- Inaugurated: 1990
- Attendance: 165,000 (average)
- Area: 30 acres (120,000 m^{2})
- Stages: 12
- Website: www.renfestival.com

The Ohio Renaissance Festival is an annual event that takes place each weekend from Labor Day weekend through the end of October. This Renaissance festival is held at a permanent site located near Harveysburg in Warren County, Ohio. It was voted Best Festival in Warren County in 2011.

The Ohio Renaissance Festival was started by Peter Carroll, and was bought in 2015 by Brimstone and Fire LLC. It has grown into a 30-acre (120,000 m^{2}) permanent village with over 166 shops and 17 outdoor stages. The festival is set in the fictional 16th-century English village of "Willy Nilly-on-the-Wash," during the reign of Elizabeth I. Historical figures like Sir Walter Raleigh, Sir Francis Drake, Sir John Hawkins and John Dee are depicted in the village, along with fictional characters.

The festival features costumed performers on stages and in the streets, jousting, craft shops selling and demonstrating period themed handcrafted goods and artwork, renaissance themed food, and regularly scheduled comedy, music, and acrobatic shows. Featured shows include Theatre in the Ground, Washing Well Wenches, Dirk and Guido: The Swordsmen! and the Kamikaze Fireflies (the vaudeville comedy duo that were featured on America's Got Talent in 2014). Each weekend of the event has a different theme, including Fantasy Weekend, Romance Weekend, Time Traveler's Weekend, Highland Weekend, and Trick-Or-Treat Weekend.

== See also ==
- List of Renaissance fairs
- Historical reenactment
- Jousting
- Society for Creative Anachronism
- List of open air and living history museums in the United States
