= Socialville, Ohio =

Unincorporated community in Ohio, U.S.

Coordinates: 39°19′10″N 84°19′54″W

Socialville is an unincorporated community in Warren County, in the U.S. state of Ohio.

== History ==
Socialville was originally called Mormontown, and under the latter name was built up by Mormons in the 1840s. A post office called Socialville was established in 1878, and remained in operation until 1913. By 1882, Socialville had a population of sixty.
