= Red Stewart Airfield =

Public use airport near Waynesville, Ohio

- IATA: none; ICAO: none; FAA LID: 40I

Summary
- Airport type: Public
- Owner: Emerson C. Stewart, Jr.
- Location: Waynesville, Ohio
- Time zone: UTC−05:00 (-5)
  - Summer (DST): UTC−04:00 (-4)
- Elevation AMSL: 955 ft / 291 m
- Coordinates: 39°30′19″N 084°07′18″W

Map
- Location of airport in Ohio 40I (the United States)

Runways
Direction	Length		Surface
Direction	ft	m	Surface
08/26	3,142	958	Turf

Statistics (2021)
- Aircraft Operations: 10,000
- Based aircraft: 49
- Sources: Federal Aviation Administration, AirNav, SkyVector

Red Stewart Airfield (FAA LID: 40I) is a public use airport located 2 nautical miles southwest of Waynesville, Ohio.

== History ==
The 40 acres (16 ha) airfield was founded by Emerson "Red" Stewart in 1946. (Note: Red first rode in an airplane at a military base in Dayton, Ohio in 1927.) After Red retired from flying, management of the field was assumed by his son, Emerson "Cub" Stewart II.

Skydiving at the airport began in the early 1970s.

== Facilities and aircraft ==
=== Facilities ===
Red Stewart Airfield has one runway, designated 08/26 with a turf surface measuring 3,142 by 150 feet (958 × 46 m).

The airport has a fixed-base operator that offers limited services. Parking includes hangars and tie-downs for visiting aircraft. Fuel service offers 100LL.

=== Aircraft ===
Based on the 12-month period ending 4 August 2021, the airport had 10,000 aircraft operations, an average of 27 per day. All were general aviation.

For the same time period, 49 aircraft are based on the field: 46 single-engine airplanes and 3 gliders.

== See also ==
- List of airports in Ohio
