= Crosswick, Ohio =

Unincorporated community in Ohio, U.S.

Coordinates: 39°32′38″N 84°04′44″W

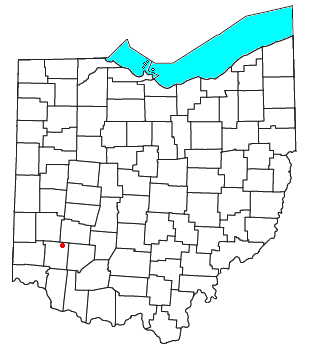
Location of Crosswick, Ohio

Crosswick is an unincorporated community in central Wayne Township, Warren County, Ohio, United States, located just outside Waynesville where Bellbrook Rd. meets Old Stage Rd.

== History ==
Crosswick (also known historically as Crosswicks) was platted by James Jennings in July 1821.
