= Fosters, Ohio =

Unincorporated community in Ohio, U.S.

Coordinates: 39°19′09″N 84°15′11″W

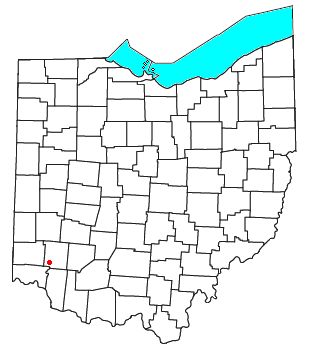
Location of Fosters, Ohio

Fosters (sometimes given as Foster) is an unincorporated community in southern Warren County, Ohio, United States. It straddles the Little Miami River in Deerfield and Hamilton Townships. It is located about two miles southwest of Hopkinsville, two miles west of Maineville, and two miles northeast of Twenty Mile Stand just off U.S. Route 22/State Route 3, the 3C Highway. (In the 1930s, the State of Ohio erected a new high bridge over the river that bypassed the community.) The community is in the Kings Local School District and is served by the Maineville post office. The settlement was originally called Foster's Crossing. The community was named after the local Foster family.

The Little Miami Bike Trail, which runs from Milford to Spring Valley, runs through the community on the eastern shore of the Little Miami River. And also someone

== Arts and culture ==
The Monkey Bar and Grille, also known as the Train Stop Inn, is located on the east side of the Little Miami River and was once a three-story hotel called The Blue Danube. It stood next to the Little Miami Railroad, which is now a bike trail. The hotel was located at Foster's train stop and covered bridge. Train passengers traveled north and south while horse and wagons passed east and west, hence the reason "Foster's Crossing" got its name. Years later, around 1975, the hotel became a tavern and a local favorite "watering hole" which featured a cigarette-smoking, beer-drinking chimp named Sam.

Fosters Earthworks (private property) is located on a wooded hilltop site on the west side of the river across from the Monkey Bar and Grille. In 1890, archaeologist Frederick Ward Putnam investigated here. He called it “a singular ancient work” of the Hopewell culture, because he found that the walls were loaded with heavily burned stone, earth, and clay. Evidence collected from this site post dates earthworks at Fort Ancient located twelve miles up river.

   During the 1940's, 50's, 60's and 70's there were many taverns: Miami Inn (owned by Herb Michael), Fish Fry, and Dick's Inn, just to name a few. Dillard's grocery and gas, the Catholic church, along with God's church, and the German/Lutheran church were within the riverside town. The Post Office was also present (Postmaster Cole). And there was Hoppe's Island (changed to Glen's Island)[7]
