= Rossburg, Warren County, Ohio =

Unincorporated community in Ohio, U.S.

Coordinates: 39°18′35″N 84°07′04″W

Rossburg is an unincorporated community in Warren County, in the U.S. state of Ohio.

== History ==
Rossburg was not officially platted. The community was named after Enoch A. Ross, the proprietor of a local tannery. A post office was established in the early 1830s as "Rossburg", and the name of the post office was changed in 1838 to "Butlerville".
