= Clearcreek Township, Warren County, Ohio =

Township in Ohio, US

Coordinates: 39°33′N 84°15′W

- Township
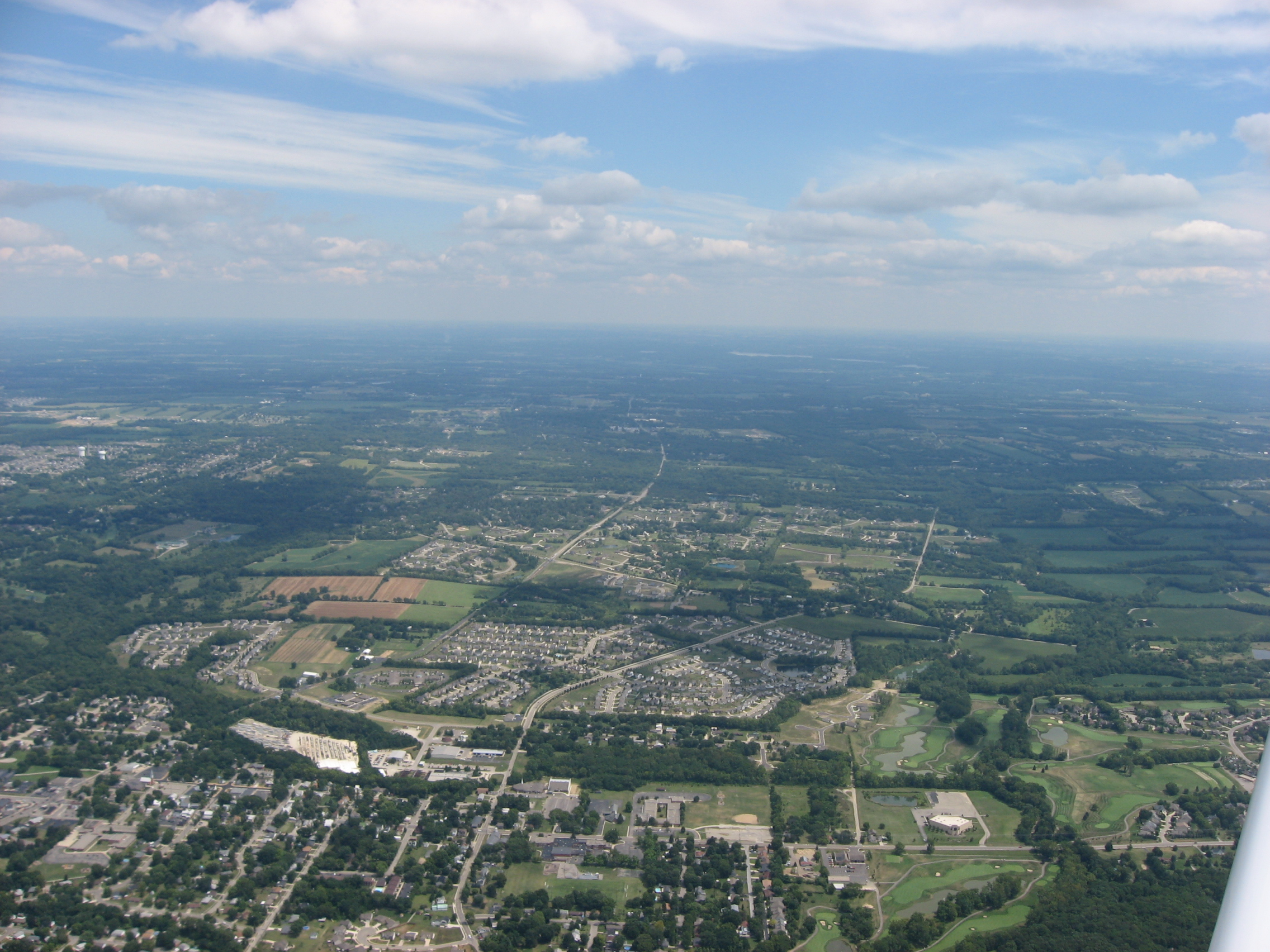
- Springboro, with unincorporated parts of Clearcreek Township visible in the distance

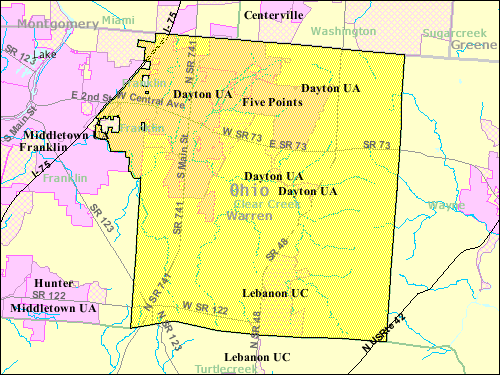
- Map of Clearcreek Township in Warren County
- Country: United States
- State: Ohio
- County: Warren

Government
  - Type: Board of Trustees
  - President: Ed Wade

Area
  - Land: 45.8 sq mi (119 km^{2})
- Elevation: 958 ft (292 m)

Population (2020)
  - Total: 36,238
  - Density: 791/sq mi (305/km^{2})
- Time zone: UTC-5 (Eastern (EST))
  - Summer (DST): UTC-4 (EDT)
- Area code: 513
- Website: https://www.clearcreektownship.com/

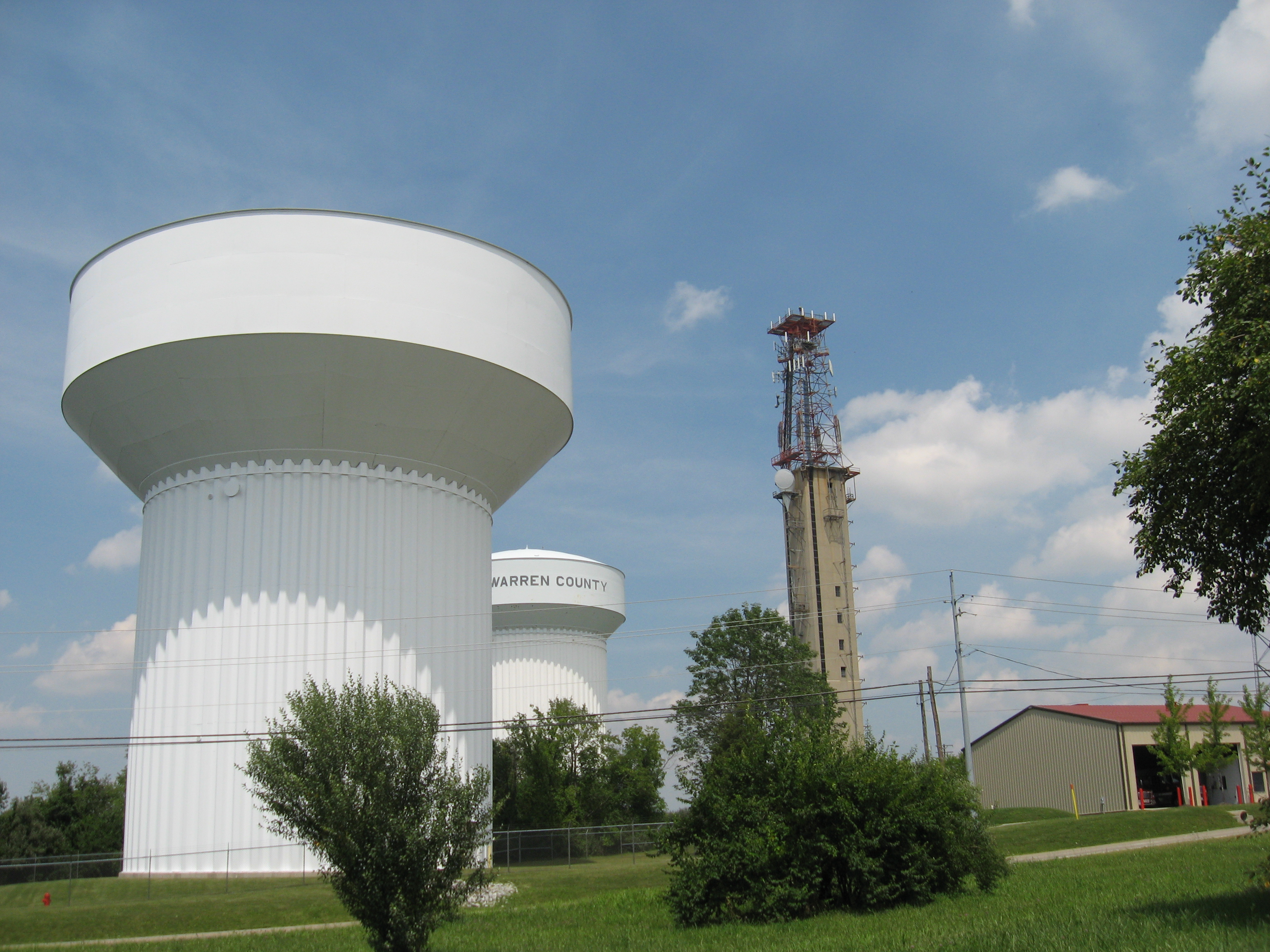
The two water towers at Five Points, the highest point in Warren County

Clearcreek Township is one of the eleven townships of Warren County, Ohio, United States, located in the north central portion of the county. It had a population of 36,238 in 2020. It was originally about forty-two square miles in area. The highest point in the county is in Clearcreek Township, near the community of Five Points. Statewide, the only other Clearcreek Townships are located in Fairfield County and in Ashland County.

== History ==
Clearcreek Township was organized in 1817, and named after its principal stream, Clear Creek.

== Geography ==
Located in the northern part of the county, it borders the following townships:

- Washington Township, Montgomery County - northeast
- Wayne Township - east
- Turtlecreek Township - south
- Franklin Township - west
- Miami Township, Montgomery County - northwest

Much of the western portion of the township has been annexed by the city of Springboro.

Communities within Clearcreek Township include Five Points, Pekin, Red Lion, Ridgeville, Springboro, and Utica (near the intersection of Utica Road and Old Route 122).

== Government ==
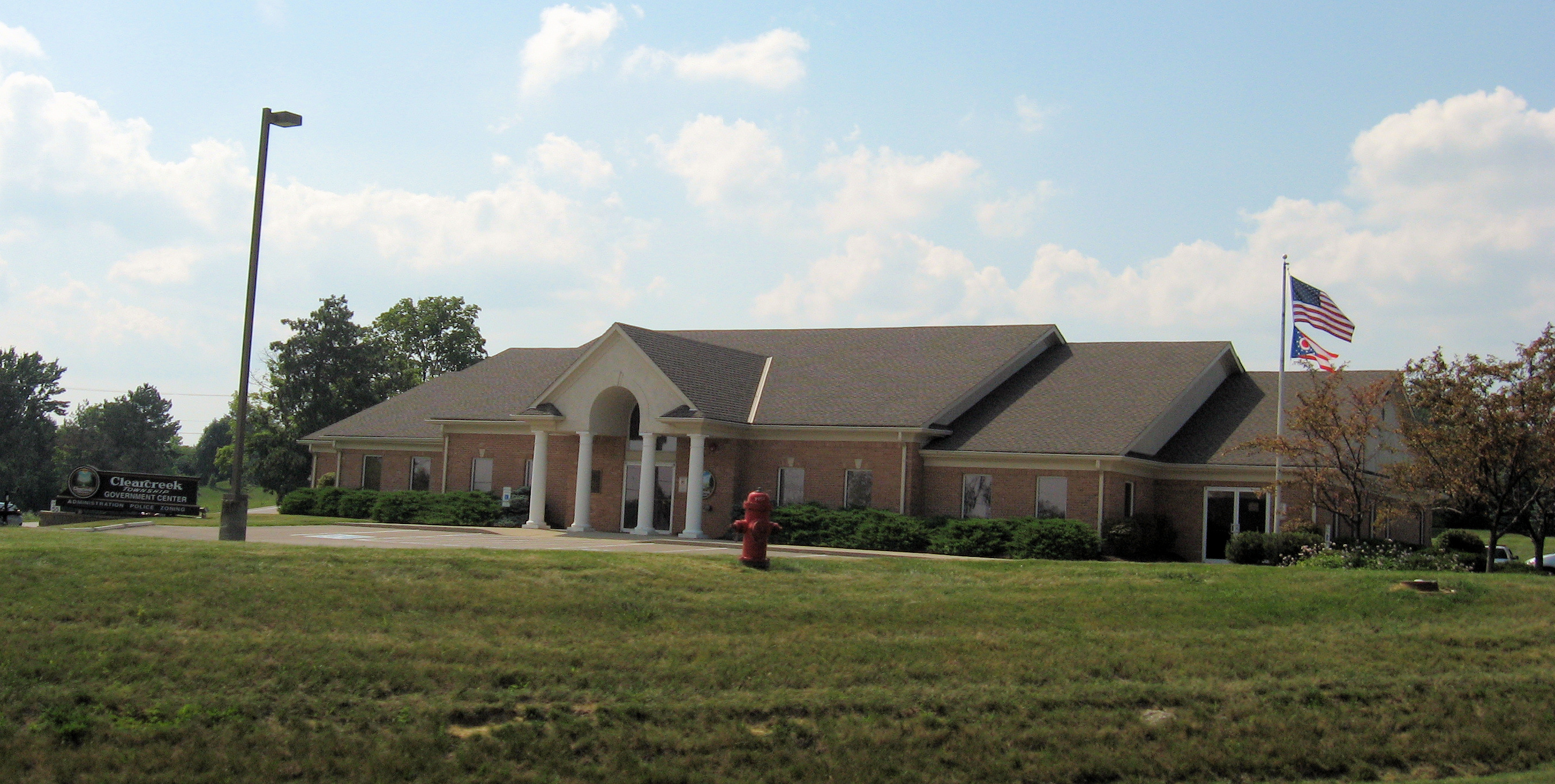
Clearcreek Township building in Springboro

The township is governed by a three-member board of trustees, who are elected in November of odd-numbered years to a four-year term beginning on the following January 1. Two are elected in the year after the presidential election and one is elected in the year before it. There is also an elected township fiscal officer, who serves a four-year term beginning on April 1 of the year after the election, which is held in November of the year before the presidential election. Vacancies in the fiscal officership or on the board of trustees are filled by the remaining trustees.

== Public services ==
Most of the township is in the Springboro Community City School District, but a large portion in the south central section is in the Lebanon City School District. Portions are also in the Franklin and Wayne school districts. The Springboro, Lebanon, Centerville and Waynesville post offices serve the township and it lies in the Franklin, Lebanon, Waynesville, Miamisburg, and Centerville telephone exchanges.

Interstate 75 runs through Clearcreek Township, as do State Routes 48, 73, and 741. A small portion of the City of Dayton's Wright Brothers Airport is in Clearcreek Township.
