= Pekin, Warren County, Ohio =

Community in Ohio, United States

Coordinates: 39.503°N 84.199°W

Pekin is an unincorporated community in Clearcreek Township, Warren County, Ohio, United States, at the intersection of State Route 48 and Pekin Road. Pekin is approximately 3 miles south of Springboro and 7 miles northwest of Lebanon.

A post office called Pekin was established in 1874, and remained in operation until 1901.
