= Hopkinsville, Ohio =

Unincorporated community in Ohio, U.S.

Coordinates: 39°20′20″N 84°13′11″W

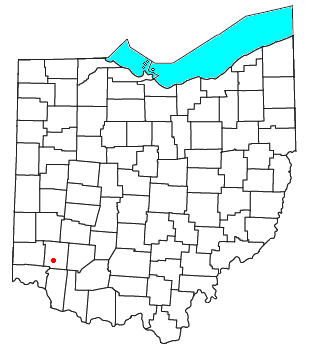
Location of Hopkinsville, Ohio

Hopkinsville is an unincorporated community in northern Hamilton Township, Warren County, Ohio, United States. It lies about one mile north of Maineville, two miles south of South Lebanon, and three miles northwest of Fosters at the crossroads of State Route 48 and the 3C Highway.

A post office called Hopkinsville was established in 1820, and remained in operation until 1903. James Hopkins, the first postmaster, gave the community his family's name.
