= 2008 United States House of Representatives elections in Ohio =

- November 4, 2008

All 18 Ohio seats to the United States House of Representatives
	Majority party	Minority party
Party	Democratic	Republican
Last election	7	11
Seats won	10	8
Seat change	▲3	▼3
Popular vote	2,752,111	2,491,498
Percentage	51.21%	46.36%
Swing	▼1.34%	▼0.86%

Democratic
40–50%
50–60%
60–70%
70–80%
80–90%
Republican
30–40%
40–50%
50–60%
60–70%
70–80%

The 2008 congressional elections in Ohio were held on November 4, 2008, and determined who would represent the state of Ohio in the United States House of Representatives. The primary election was held on March 4, 2008.

Ohio had eighteen seats in the House, apportioned according to the 2000 United States census. Representatives are elected for two-year terms; those elected in November 2008 served in the 111th Congress from January 3, 2009, until January 3, 2011. The election coincided with the 2008 U.S. presidential election.

Districts 1, 15, and 16 changed party (from Republican to Democratic), although CQ Politics had forecasted districts 1, 2, 14, 15, 16 and 18 to be at some risk for the incumbent party. District 15 was not decided until December 8, 2008. Until 2026, this is the last time that Democrats won both a majority of congressional districts and the House popular vote in the state.

== Overview ==
United States House of Representatives elections in Ohio, 2008
Party	Votes	Percentage	Seats before	Seats after	+/–
Democratic	2,752,111	51.21%	7	10	+3
Republican	2,491,498	46.36%	11	8	-3
Libertarian	44,902	0.84%	0	0	-
Green	13,812	0.26%	0	0	-
Independent	72,017	1.34%	0	0	-
Totals	5,374,340	100%	18	18	—

=== Match-up summary ===
District	Incumbent	2008 status	Democratic	Republican	Green	Libertarian	Ind	Ind	Ind
1	Steve Chabot	Re-election	Steve Driehaus	Steve Chabot			Rich Stevenson (WI)	Eric Wilson (WI)	
2	Jean Schmidt	Re-election	Victoria Wulsin	Jean Schmidt			David Krikorian	James Condit (WI)	
3	Mike Turner	Re-election	Jane Mitakides	Mike Turner					
4	Jim Jordan	Re-election	Mike Carroll	Jim Jordan					
5	Bob Latta	Re-election	George Mays	Bob Latta					
6	Charlie Wilson	Re-election	Charlie Wilson	Richard Stobbs	Dennis Spisak				
7	David Hobson	Open	Sharen Neuhardt	Steve Austria					
8	John Boehner	Re-election	Nicholas Von Stein	John Boehner					
9	Marcy Kaptur	Re-election	Marcy Kaptur	Bradley Leavitt					
10	Dennis Kucinich	Re-election	Dennis Kucinich	Jim Trakas		Paul Conroy			
11	Marcia L. Fudge	Re-election	Marcia L. Fudge	Thomas Pekarek			Craig Willis (WI)	Eric Johnson (WI)	Robert Reed (WI)
12	Pat Tiberi	Re-election	David Robinson	Pat Tiberi		Steve Linnabary			
13	Betty Sutton	Re-election	Betty Sutton	David Potter			Robert Crow (WI)		
14	Steve LaTourette	Re-election	Bill O'Neill	Steve LaTourette		David Macko			
15	Deborah Pryce	Open	Mary Jo Kilroy	Steve Stivers		Mark M. Noble	Don Elijah Eckhart	Travis Casper	
16	Ralph Regula	Open	John Boccieri	Kirk Schuring					
17	Tim Ryan	Re-election	Tim Ryan	Duane Grassell					
18	Zack Space	Re-election	Zack Space	Fred Dailey					

== District 1 ==
2008 Ohio's 1st congressional district election
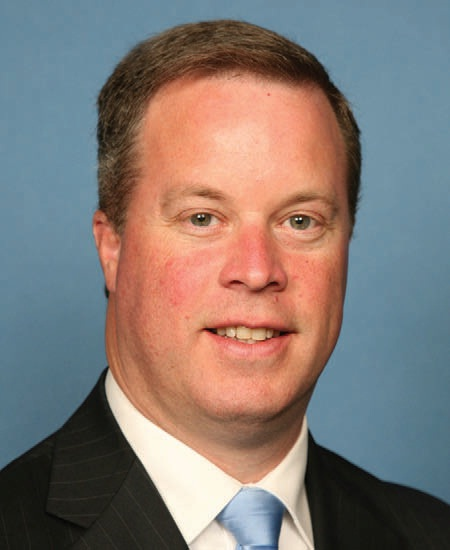

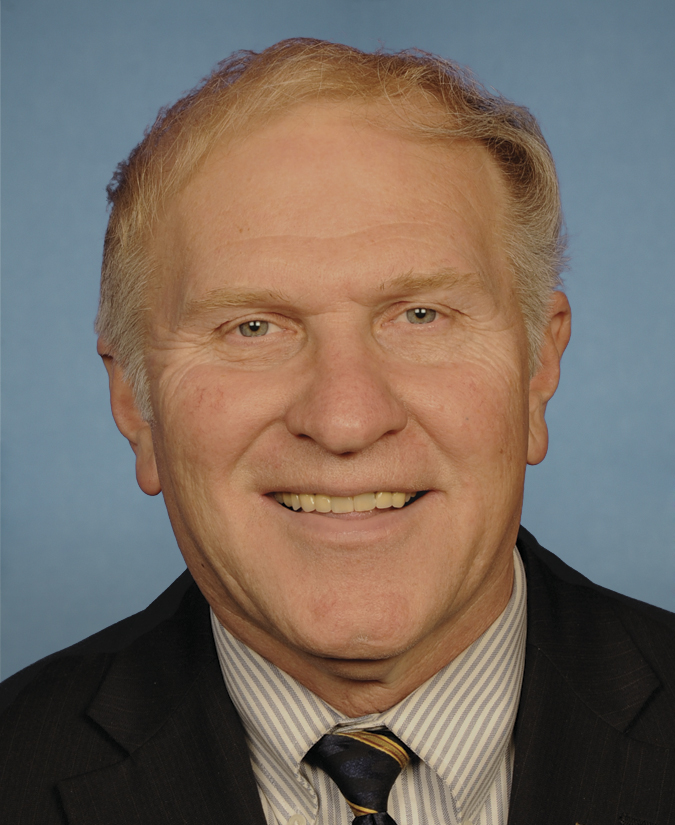
Nominee	Steve Driehaus	Steve Chabot
Party	Democratic	Republican
Popular vote	155,089	140,469
Percentage	52.5%	47.5%
- County results Driehaus: 50–60% Chabot: 70–80%
U.S. Representative before election
Steve Chabot
Republican
Elected U.S. Representative
Steve Driehaus
Democratic

Democratic nominee Steve Driehaus won against Republican incumbent Steve Chabot. Driehaus lost re-election to Chabot in 2010, who was re-elected 5 more times before losing re-election again in 2022.

=== Predictions ===
Source	Ranking	As of
The Cook Political Report	Tossup	November 6, 2008
Rothenberg	Tossup	November 2, 2008
Sabato's Crystal Ball	Lean D (flip)	November 6, 2008
Real Clear Politics	Tossup	November 7, 2008
CQ Politics	Tossup	November 6, 2008

=== Results ===
Ohio's 1st Congressional District election, 2008
Party	Candidate	Votes	%
Democratic	Steve Driehaus	155,089	52.5
Republican	Steve Chabot (Incumbent)	140,469	47.5
Total votes		295,558	100
Democratic gain from Republican			

- Race ranking and details from CQ Politics
- Campaign contributions from OpenSecrets
- Chabot (R-i) vs Driehaus (D) graph of collected poll results from Pollster.com

== District 2 ==
2008 Ohio's 2nd congressional district election
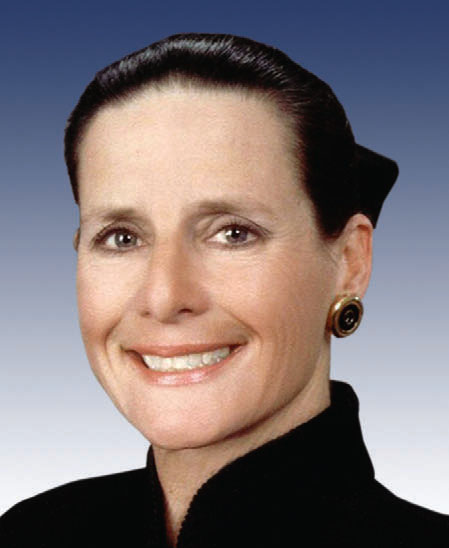

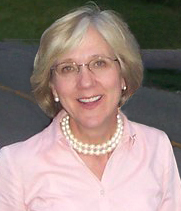

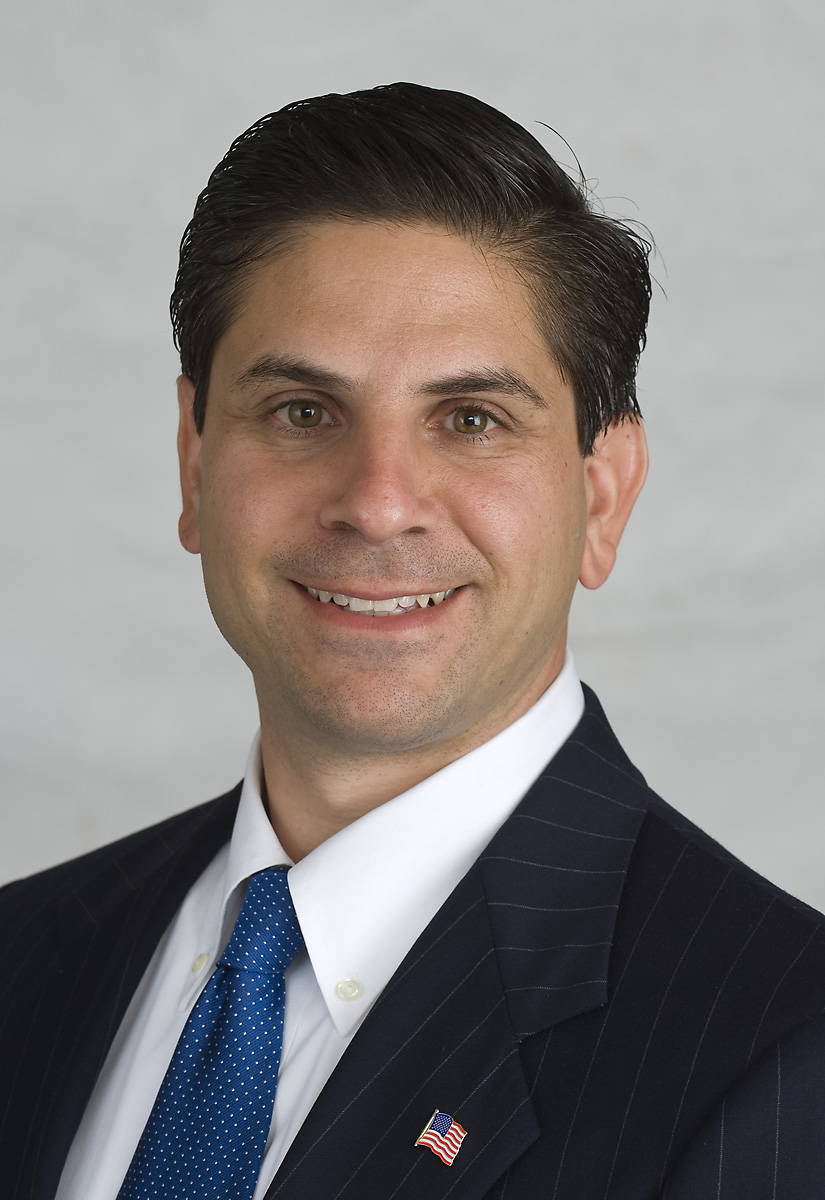
	Majority party	Minority party	Third party
Candidate	Jean Schmidt	Victoria Wulsin	David Krikorian
Party	Republican	Democratic	Independent
Popular vote	148,671	124,213	58,710
Percentage	44.8%	37.4%	17.7%
- County results Schmidt: 30–40% 40–50% 50–60% Wulsin: 40–50% 50–60%
U.S. Representative before election
Jean Schmidt
Republican
Elected U.S. Representative
Jean Schmidt
Republican

Republican incumbent Jean Schmidt won against Democratic nominee Victoria Wulsin and Independent candidate David Krikorian.

2008 Republican primary results by county Schmidt 50–60% Schmidt 60–70%

=== Predictions ===
Source	Ranking	As of
The Cook Political Report	Lean R	November 6, 2008
Rothenberg	Lean R	November 2, 2008
Sabato's Crystal Ball	Lean R	November 6, 2008
Real Clear Politics	Lean R	November 7, 2008
CQ Politics	Lean R	November 6, 2008

=== Results ===
Ohio's 2nd Congressional District election, 2008
Party	Candidate	Votes	%
Republican	Jean Schmidt (Incumbent)	148,671	44.8
Democratic	Victoria Wells Wulsin	124,213	37.4
Independent	David Krikorian	58,710	17.7
Total votes		331,594	100
Republican hold			

- Race ranking and details from CQ Politics
- Campaign contributions from OpenSecrets
- Schmidt (R-i) vs Wulsin (D) graph of collected poll results from Pollster.com

== District 3 ==
2008 Ohio's 3rd congressional district election
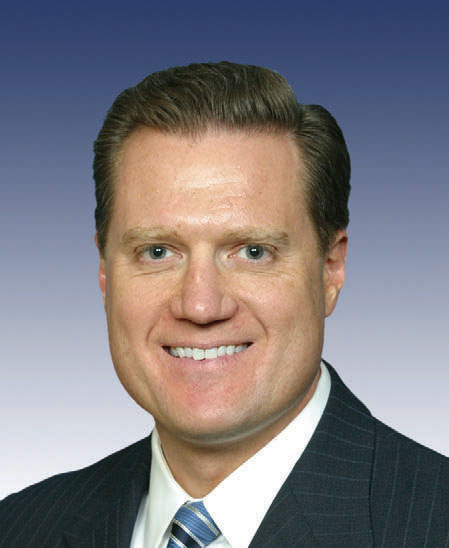

Nominee	Mike Turner	Jane Mitakides
Party	Republican	Democratic
Popular vote	200,204	115,976
Percentage	63.3%	36.7%
- County results Turner: 50–60% 60–70% 70–80%
U.S. Representative before election
Mike Turner
Republican
Elected U.S. Representative
Mike Turner
Republican

Republican incumbent Mike Turner won against Democratic nominee Jane Mitakides.

=== Predictions ===
Source	Ranking	As of
The Cook Political Report	Safe R	November 6, 2008
Rothenberg	Safe R	November 2, 2008
Sabato's Crystal Ball	Safe R	November 6, 2008
Real Clear Politics	Safe R	November 7, 2008
CQ Politics	Safe R	November 6, 2008

=== Results ===
Ohio's 3rd Congressional District election, 2008
Party	Candidate	Votes	%
Republican	Mike Turner (Incumbent)	200,204	63.3
Democratic	Jane Mitakides	115,976	36.7
Total votes		316,180	100
Republican hold			

- Race ranking and details from CQ Politics
- Campaign contributions from OpenSecrets

== District 4 ==
2008 Ohio's 4th congressional district election
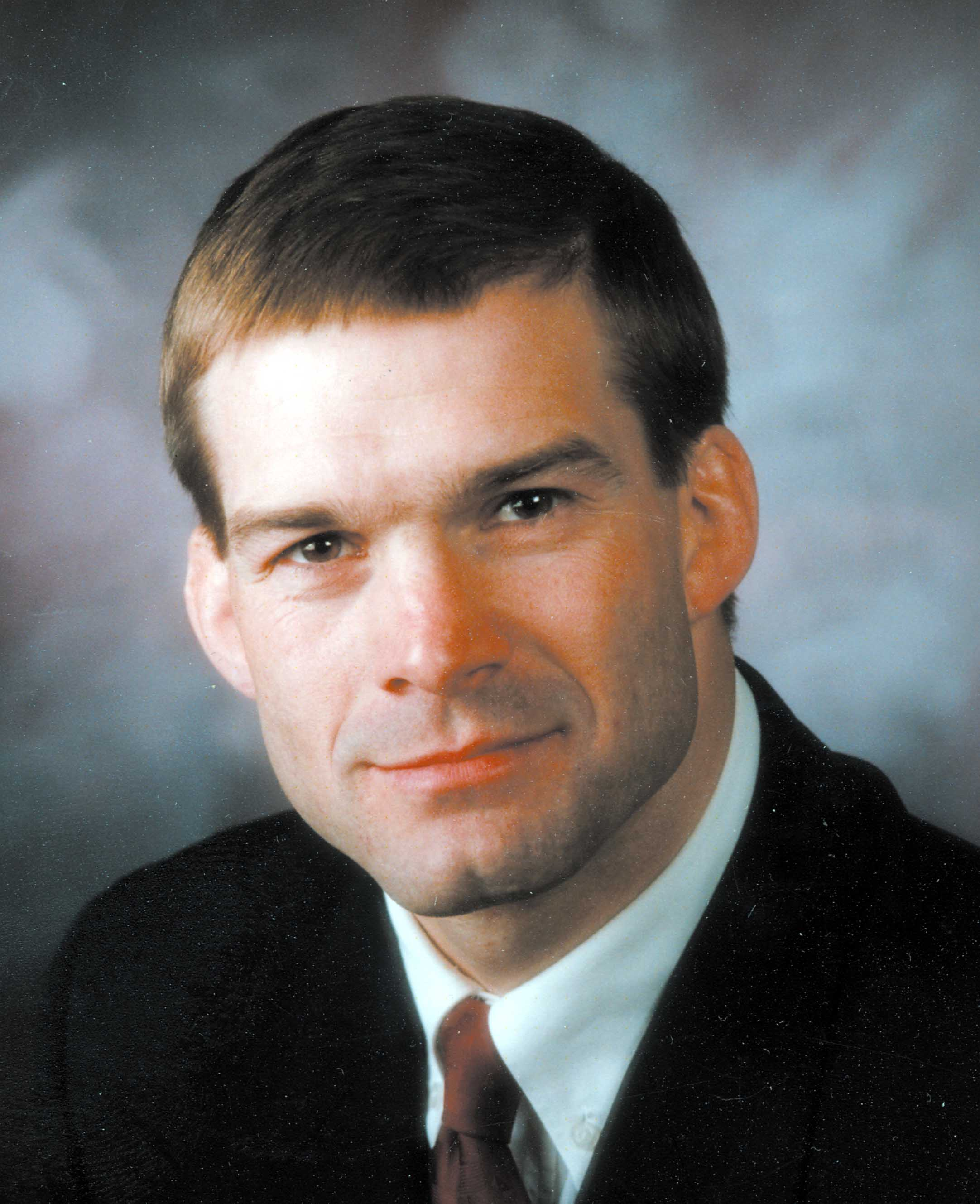

Nominee	Jim Jordan	Mike Carroll
Party	Republican	Democratic
Popular vote	186,140	99,491
Percentage	65.2%	34.8%
- County results Jordan: 50–60% 60–70% 70–80%
U.S. Representative before election
Jim Jordan
Republican
Elected U.S. Representative
Jim Jordan
Republican

Republican incumbent Jim Jordan won against Democratic nominee Mike Carroll.

=== Predictions ===
Source	Ranking	As of
The Cook Political Report	Safe R	November 6, 2008
Rothenberg	Safe R	November 2, 2008
Sabato's Crystal Ball	Safe R	November 6, 2008
Real Clear Politics	Safe R	November 7, 2008
CQ Politics	Safe R	November 6, 2008

=== Results ===
Ohio's 4th Congressional District election, 2008
Party	Candidate	Votes	%
Republican	Jim Jordan	186,140	65.2
Democratic	Mike Carroll	99,491	34.8
Total votes		216,636	100
Republican hold			

- Race ranking and details from CQ Politics
- Campaign contributions from OpenSecrets

== District 5 ==
2008 Ohio's 5th congressional district election
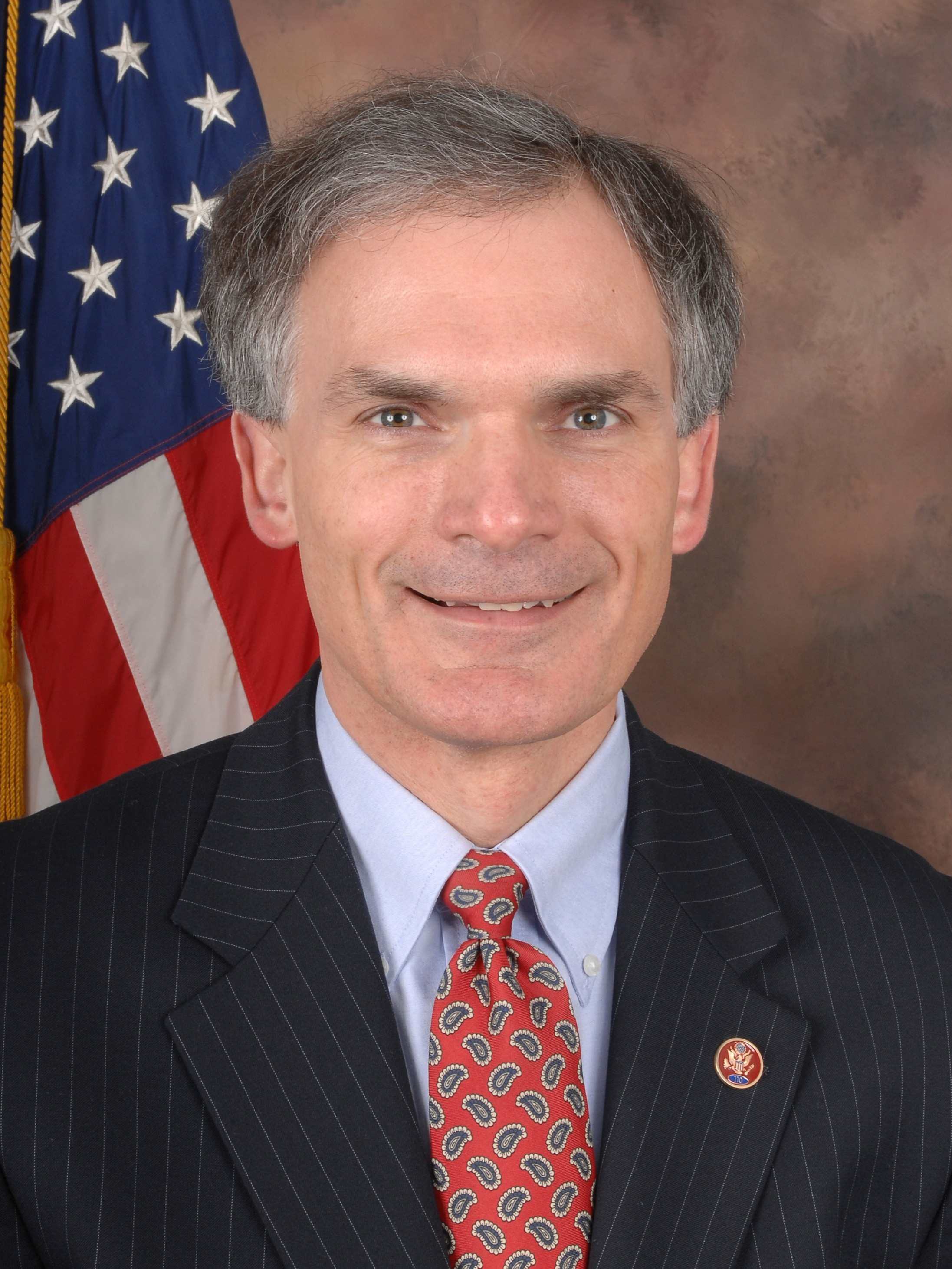

Nominee	Bob Latta	George Mays
Party	Republican	Democratic
Popular vote	188,905	105,840
Percentage	64.1%	35.9%
- County results Latta: 50–60% 60–70% 70–80%
U.S. Representative before election
Bob Latta
Republican
Elected U.S. Representative
Bob Latta
Republican

Republican incumbent Bob Latta won against Democratic nominee George Mays.

=== Predictions ===
Source	Ranking	As of
The Cook Political Report	Safe R	November 6, 2008
Rothenberg	Safe R	November 2, 2008
Sabato's Crystal Ball	Safe R	November 6, 2008
Real Clear Politics	Safe R	November 7, 2008
CQ Politics	Safe R	November 6, 2008

=== Results ===
Ohio's 5th Congressional District election, 2008
Party	Candidate	Votes	%
Republican	Bob Latta	188,905	64.1
Democratic	George Mays	105,840	35.9
Total votes		294,745	100
Republican hold			

- Race ranking and details from CQ Politics
- Campaign contributions from OpenSecrets

== District 6 ==
2008 Ohio's 6th congressional district election
- November 4, 2008
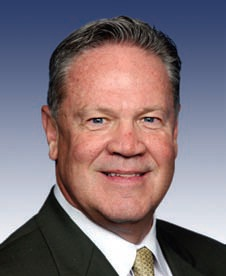

Nominee	Charlie Wilson	Richard Stobbs
Party	Democratic	Republican
Popular vote	188,905	92,968
Percentage	62.3%	32.8%
- Wilson: 40–50% 50–60% 60–70% 70–80% 80–90% >90% Stobbs: 40–50% 50–60% 70–80%
U.S. Representative before election
Charlie Wilson
Democratic
Elected U.S. Representative
Charlie Wilson
Democratic

Democratic incumbent Charlie Wilson won against Republican nominee Richard Stobbs.

=== Predictions ===
Source	Ranking	As of
The Cook Political Report	Safe D	November 6, 2008
Rothenberg	Safe D	November 2, 2008
Sabato's Crystal Ball	Safe D	November 6, 2008
Real Clear Politics	Safe D	November 7, 2008
CQ Politics	Safe D	November 6, 2008

=== Results ===
Ohio's 5th Congressional District election, 2008
Party	Candidate	Votes	%
Democratic	Charlie Wilson (incumbent)	188,905	62.3
Republican	Richard Stobbs	92,968	32.8
Green	Dennis Spisak	13,812	4.9
Total votes		295,685	100
Democratic hold			

- Race ranking and details from CQ Politics
- Campaign contributions from OpenSecrets

== District 7 ==
2008 Ohio's 7th congressional district election
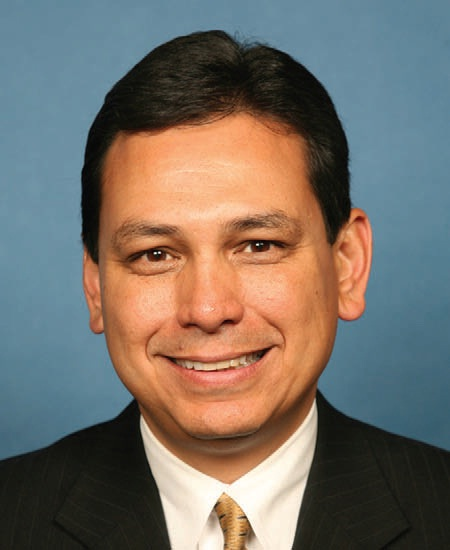

Nominee	Steve Austria	Sharen Swartz Neuhardt
Party	Republican	Democratic
Popular vote	174,915	125,547
Percentage	58.2%	41.8%
- County results Austria: 50–60% 60–70% Neuhardt: 50–60%
U.S. Representative before election
David Hobson
Republican
Elected U.S. Representative
Steve Austria
Republican

Republican incumbent David Hobson did not run for re-election in 2008. Republican nominee Steve Austria won against Democratic nominee Sharen Neuhardt.

=== Predictions ===
Source	Ranking	As of
The Cook Political Report	Likely R	November 6, 2008
Rothenberg	Safe R	November 2, 2008
Sabato's Crystal Ball	Safe R	November 6, 2008
Real Clear Politics	Safe R	November 7, 2008
CQ Politics	Likely R	November 6, 2008

=== Results ===
Ohio's 7th Congressional District election, 2008
Party	Candidate	Votes	%
Republican	Steve Austria	174,915	58.2
Democratic	Sharen Swartz Neuhardt	125,547	41.8
Total votes		300,462	100
Republican hold			

- Race ranking and details from CQ Politics
- Campaign contributions from OpenSecrets
- Austria (R) vs Neuhardt (D) graph of collected poll results from Pollster.com

== District 8 ==
2008 Ohio's 8th congressional district election
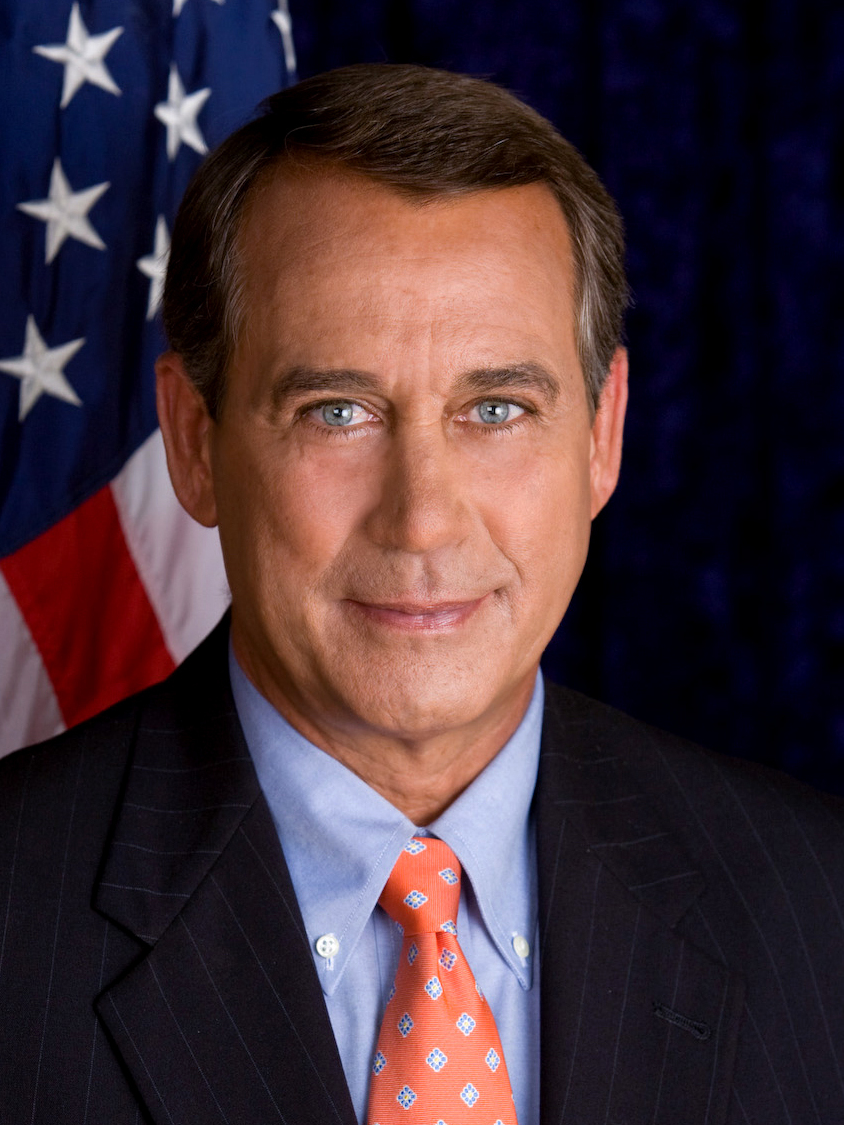

Nominee	John Boehner	Nicholas Von Stein
Party	Republican	Democratic
Popular vote	202,063	95,510
Percentage	67.9%	32.1%
- County results Boehner: 50–60% 60–70% 70–80%
U.S. Representative before election
John Boehner
Republican
Elected U.S. Representative
John Boehner
Republican

Republican incumbent John Boehner won against Democratic nominee Nicholas Von Stein.

=== Predictions ===
Source	Ranking	As of
The Cook Political Report	Safe R	November 6, 2008
Rothenberg	Safe R	November 2, 2008
Sabato's Crystal Ball	Safe R	November 6, 2008
Real Clear Politics	Safe R	November 7, 2008
CQ Politics	Safe R	November 6, 2008

=== Results ===
Ohio's 8th Congressional District election, 2008
Party	Candidate	Votes	%
Republican	John Boehner (incumbent)	202,063	67.9
Democratic	Nicholas Von Stein	95,510	32.1
Total votes		297,573	100
Republican hold			

- Race ranking and details from CQ Politics
- Campaign contributions from OpenSecrets

== District 9 ==
2008 Ohio's 9th congressional district election
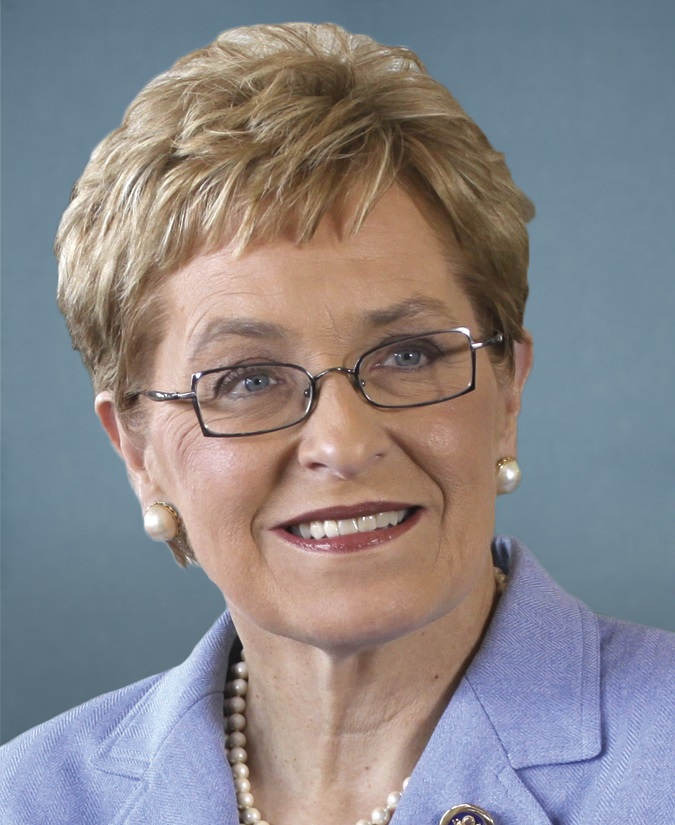

Nominee	Marcy Kaptur	Bradley S. Leavitt
Party	Democratic	Republican
Popular vote	222,054	76,512
Percentage	74.4%	25.6%
- County results Kaptur: 60–70% 70–80%
U.S. Representative before election
Marcy Kaptur
Republican
Elected U.S. Representative
Marcy Kaptur
Democratic

Democratic incumbent Marcy Kaptur won against Republican nominee Bradley S. Leavitt.

=== Predictions ===
Source	Ranking	As of
The Cook Political Report	Safe D	November 6, 2008
Rothenberg	Safe D	November 2, 2008
Sabato's Crystal Ball	Safe D	November 6, 2008
Real Clear Politics	Safe D	November 7, 2008
CQ Politics	Safe D	November 6, 2008

=== Results ===
Ohio's 9th Congressional District election, 2008
Party	Candidate	Votes	%
Democratic	Marcy Kaptur (incumbent)	222,054	74.4
Republican	Bradley S. Leavitt	76,512	25.6
Total votes		298,566	100
Democratic hold			

- Race ranking and details from CQ Politics
- Campaign contributions from OpenSecrets

== District 10 ==
2008 Ohio's 10th congressional district election
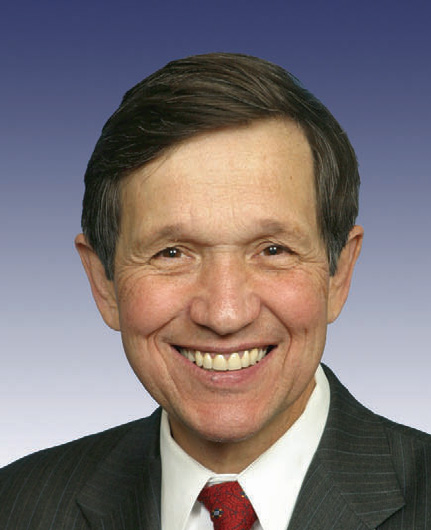

Nominee	Dennis Kucinich	Jim Trakas
Party	Democratic	Republican
Popular vote	157,268	107,918
Percentage	57.0%	39.1%
- County results Kucinich: 50–60%
U.S. Representative before election
Dennis Kucinich
Democratic
Elected U.S. Representative
Dennis Kucinich
Democratic

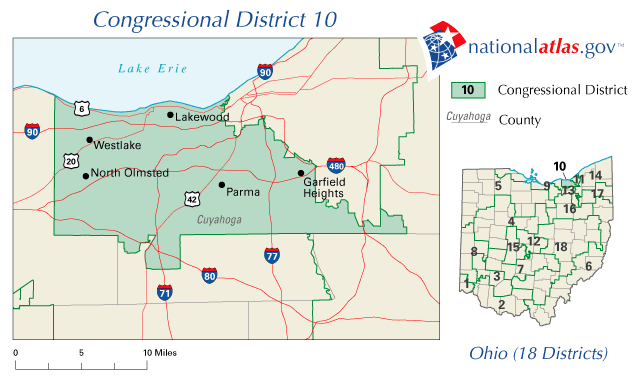

The Democratic primary was held March 4, 2008, the same day as the Texas and Ohio presidential primaries. The candidates were Cleveland city councilman Joe Cimperman, North Olmsted mayor Thomas O'Grady, Barbra Ferris and Rosemary Palmer.

Kucinich previously stated that he would run again for Congress in 2008 if his bid for president were unsuccessful.

For 2008, however, Kucinich was facing four challengers in the Democratic primary scheduled for March 4, which prompted him to abandon his run for president. Opponents included Cleveland City Councilman Joe Cimperman and North Olmsted Mayor Thomas O'Grady. Having only raised around $50,000 so far compared to Cimperman's $228,000, Kucinich put out appeals for campaign funding on YouTube. He managed to raise $700,000, surpassing Cimperman's $487,000.

Cimperman, who was endorsed by the Mayor of Cleveland and the Cleveland Plain Dealer, criticized Kucinich for focusing too much on campaigning for president and not on the district. Kucinich accused Cimperman of representing corporate and real estate interests. Cimperman described Kucinich as an absentee congressman who failed to pass any major legislative initiatives in his 12-year House career. In an interview, Cimperman said he was tired of Kucinich and Cleveland being joke fodder for late-night talk-show hosts, saying, "It's time for him to go home". An ad paid for by Cimperman's campaign claimed that Kucinich had missed over 300 votes, but by checking the ad's source, the actual number was 139.

A report suggested that representatives of Nancy Pelosi and American Israel Public Affairs Committee would "guarantee" Kucinich's re-election if he dropped his bid to impeach Cheney and Bush, though Kucinich denied the meeting happened. It was also suggested that Kucinich's calls for universal health care and an immediate withdrawal from Iraq made him a thorn in the side of the Democrats' congressional leadership, as well as his refusal to pledge to support the eventual presidential nominee.

At the last minute, Kucinich took part in a debate with the other primary challengers. Barbara Ferris criticized him for not bringing as much money back to the district as other area legislators and authoring just one bill that passed during his 12 years in Congress. Kucinich responded:

"It was a Republican Congress and there weren't many Democrats passing meaningful legislation during a Republican Congress."

Kucinich easily won the primary by a 15-point-margin over his nearest opponent, Joe Cimperman.

2008 10th district democratic primary election, Ohio
Party	Candidate	Votes	%	±%
Democratic	Dennis J. Kucinich (Incumbent)	68,156	50.27%	
Democratic	Joe Cimperman	47,891	35.32%	−
Democratic	Barbara Ferris	8,780	6.48%	−
Democratic	Thomas O'Grady	6,780	5%	−
Democratic	Rosemary Palmer	3,982	2.94%	−
Majority		20,265	14.95%	
Turnout				

=== Predictions ===
Source	Ranking	As of
The Cook Political Report	Safe D	November 6, 2008
Rothenberg	Safe D	November 2, 2008
Sabato's Crystal Ball	Safe D	November 6, 2008
Real Clear Politics	Safe D	November 7, 2008
CQ Politics	Safe D	November 6, 2008

=== Results ===
Kucinich then beat Republican nominee Jim Trakas.

Ohio's 10th Congressional District election, 2008
Party	Candidate	Votes	%
Democratic	Dennis Kucinich (incumbent)	157,268	57.0
Republican	Jim Trakas	107,918	39.1
Libertarian	Paul Conroy	10,623	3.9
Total votes		275,809	100
Democratic hold			

- Race ranking and details from CQ Politics
- Campaign contributions from OpenSecrets

== District 11 ==
2008 Ohio's 11th congressional district election
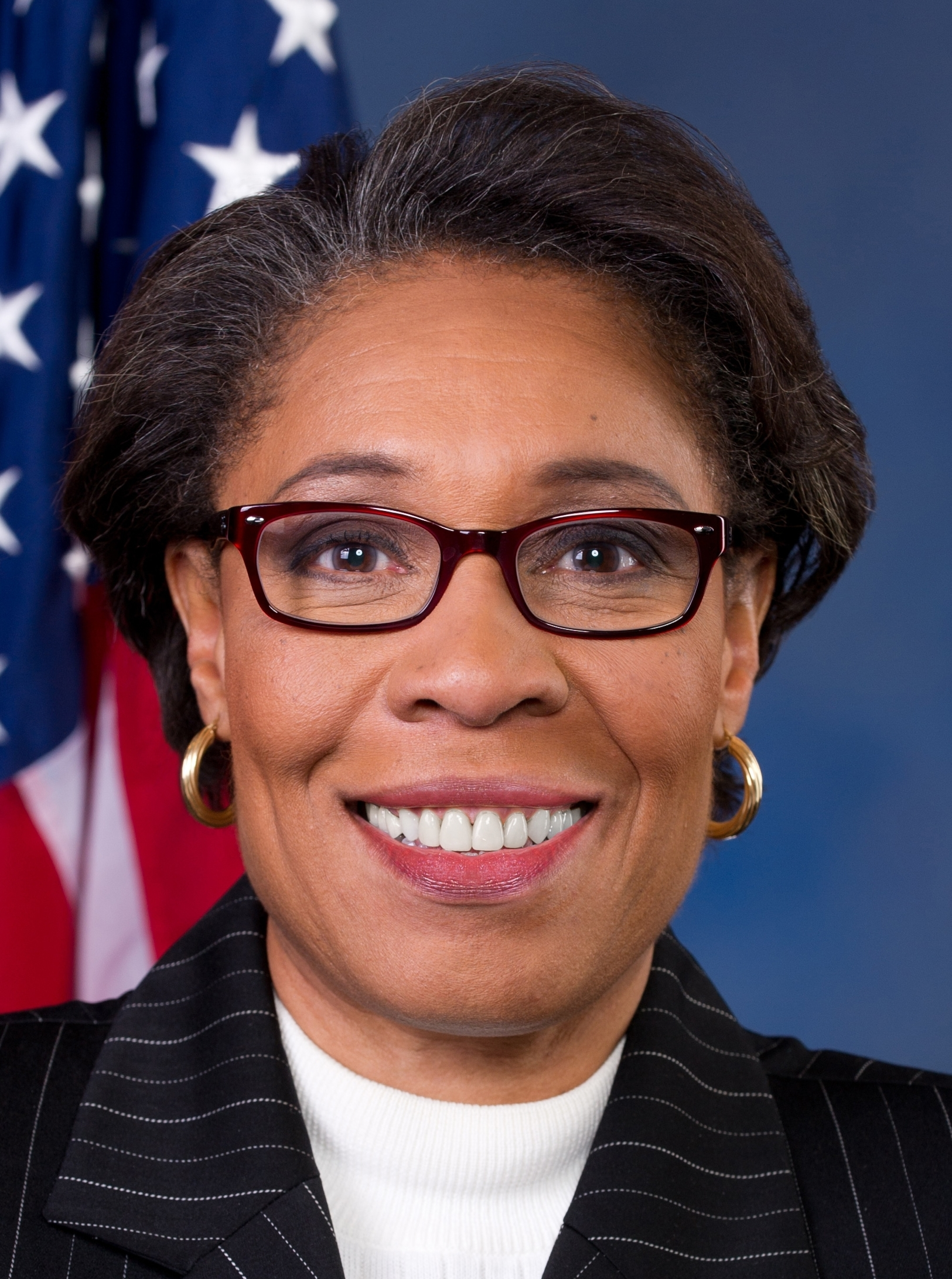

Nominee	Marcia L. Fudge	Thomas Pekarek
Party	Democratic	Republican
Popular vote	146,840	36,705
Percentage	83.4%	14.7%
U.S. Representative before election
Stephanie Tubbs Jones
Democratic
Elected U.S. Representative
Marcia L. Fudge
Democratic

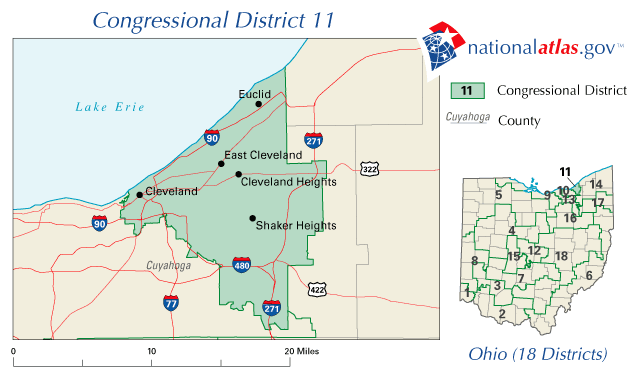

Democratic nominee Marcia Fudge won against Republican nominee Thomas Pekarek.

=== Predictions ===
Source	Ranking	As of
The Cook Political Report	Safe D	November 6, 2008
Rothenberg	Safe D	November 2, 2008
Sabato's Crystal Ball	Safe D	November 6, 2008
Real Clear Politics	Safe D	November 7, 2008
CQ Politics	Safe D	November 6, 2008

Ohio's 11th Congressional District election, 2008
Party	Candidate	Votes	%
Democratic	Marcia L. Fudge	146,840	83.4
Republican	Thomas Pekarek	36,705	14.7
Independent	Write-Ins	144	1
Total votes		175,973	100
Democratic hold			

- Race ranking and details from CQ Politics
- Campaign contributions from OpenSecrets

A special election was held on November 18, 2008, to fill Jones's seat for the remainder of the 110th Congress, until January 3, 2009, which Fudge won with 100% of the vote. See Ohio's 11th congressional district special election, 2008.

== District 12 ==
2008 Ohio's 12th congressional district election
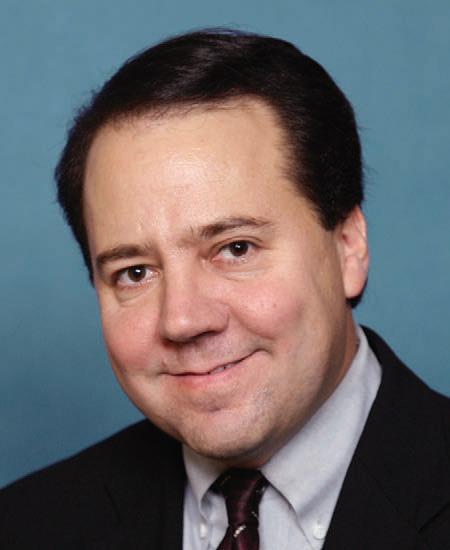

Nominee	Pat Tiberi	David Robinson
Party	Republican	Democratic
Popular vote	197,447	152,234
Percentage	54.8%	42.2%
- County results Tiberi: 60–70% Robinson: 50–60%
U.S. Representative before election
Pat Tiberi
Republican
Elected U.S. Representative
Pat Tiberi
Republican

Republican incumbent Pat Tiberi won against Democratic nominee David Robinson.

=== Predictions ===
Source	Ranking	As of
The Cook Political Report	Likely R	November 6, 2008
Rothenberg	Safe R	November 2, 2008
Sabato's Crystal Ball	Safe R	November 6, 2008
Real Clear Politics	Safe R	November 7, 2008
CQ Politics	Likely R	November 6, 2008

=== Results ===
Ohio's 12th Congressional District election, 2008
Party	Candidate	Votes	%
Republican	Pat Tiberi (Incumbent)	197,447	54.8
Democratic	David Robinson	152,234	42.2
Libertarian	Steve Linnabary	10,707	3
Total votes		360,388	100
Republican hold			

- Race ranking and details from CQ Politics
- Campaign contributions from OpenSecrets

== District 13 ==
2008 Ohio's 13th congressional district election
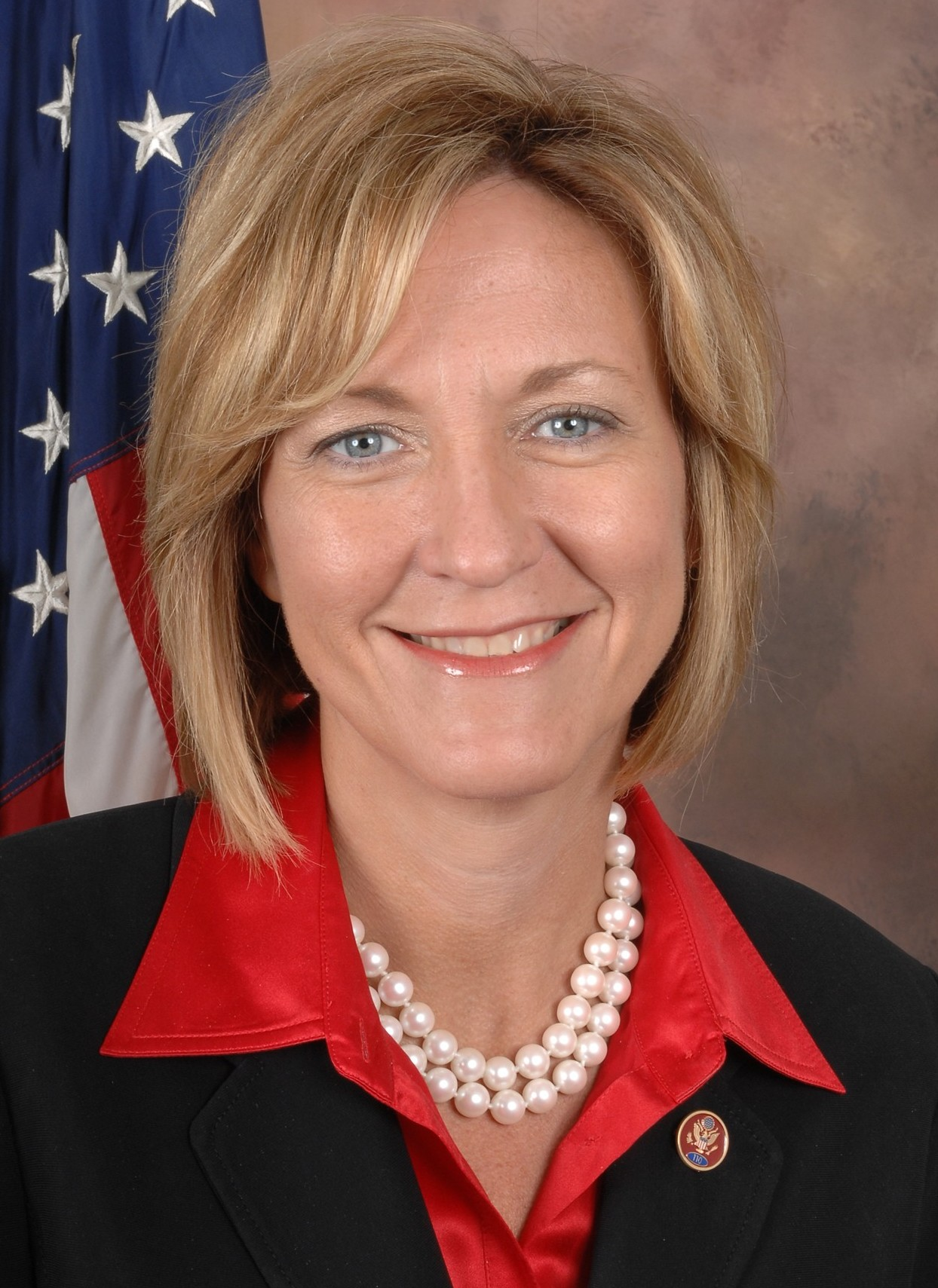

Nominee	Betty Sutton	David Potter
Party	Democratic	Republican
Popular vote	189,542	104,066
Percentage	64.6%	35.4%
- County results Sutton: 50–60% 60–70%
U.S. Representative before election
Betty Sutton
Democratic
Elected U.S. Representative
Betty Sutton
Democratic

Democratic incumbent Betty Sutton won against Republican nominee David Potter.

=== Predictions ===
Source	Ranking	As of
The Cook Political Report	Safe D	November 6, 2008
Rothenberg	Safe D	November 2, 2008
Sabato's Crystal Ball	Safe D	November 6, 2008
Real Clear Politics	Safe D	November 7, 2008
CQ Politics	Safe D	November 6, 2008

=== Results ===
Ohio's 13th Congressional District election, 2008
Party	Candidate	Votes	%
Democratic	Betty Sutton (incumbent)	189,542	64.6
Republican	David Potter	104,066	35.4
Total votes		293,608	100
Democratic hold			

- Race ranking and details from CQ Politics
- Campaign contributions from OpenSecrets

== District 14 ==
2008 Ohio's 14th congressional district election
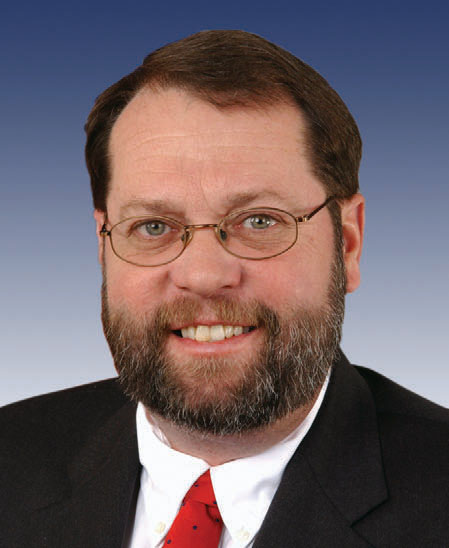

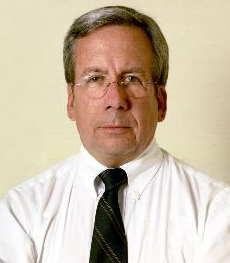
Nominee	Steve LaTourette	Bill O'Neill
Party	Republican	Democratic
Popular vote	188,488	125,214
Percentage	58.3%	38.7%
- County results LaTourette: 50–60% 60–70%
U.S. Representative before election
Steve LaTourette
Republican
Elected U.S. Representative
Steve LaTourette
Republican

Republican incumbent Steve LaTourette won against Democratic nominee Bill O'Neill.

=== Predictions ===
Source	Ranking	As of
The Cook Political Report	Likely R	November 6, 2008
Rothenberg	Safe R	November 2, 2008
Sabato's Crystal Ball	Safe R	November 6, 2008
Real Clear Politics	Safe R	November 7, 2008
CQ Politics	Likely R	November 6, 2008

=== Results ===
Ohio's 14th Congressional District election, 2006
Party	Candidate	Votes	%
Republican	Steve LaTourette (incumbent)	188,488	58.3
Democratic	Bill O'Neill	125,214	38.7
Libertarian	Werner J. Lange	9,511	3
Total votes		323,213	100
Republican hold			

- Race ranking and details from CQ Politics
- Campaign contributions from OpenSecrets

== District 15 ==
2008 Ohio's 15th congressional district election
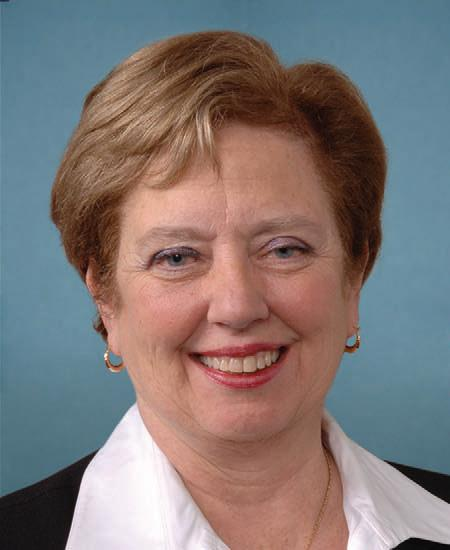

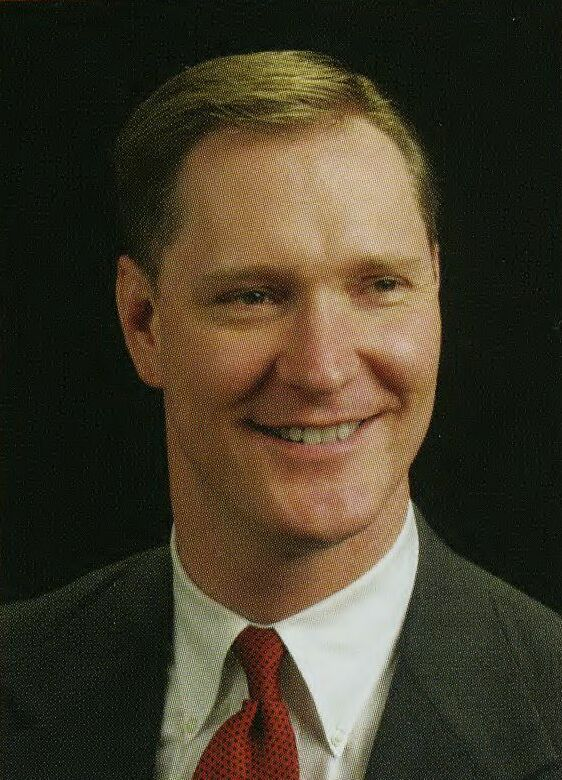
Nominee	Mary Jo Kilroy	Steve Stivers
Party	Democratic	Republican
Popular vote	139,584	137,272
Percentage	45.9%	45.2%
- County results Kilroy: 40–50% Stivers: 50–60% 60–70%
U.S. Representative before election
Deborah Pryce
Republican
Elected U.S. Representative
Mary Jo Kilroy
Democratic

The election results were essentially tied, requiring an automatic recount. Republican incumbent Deborah Pryce did not run for re-election in 2008, leaving this an open seat. Kilroy defeated Stivers by 2,311 votes in a race not decided until the final ballots were counted on December 7, 2008.

=== Predictions ===
Source	Ranking	As of
The Cook Political Report	Lean D (flip)	November 6, 2008
Rothenberg	Tilt D (flip)	November 2, 2008
Sabato's Crystal Ball	Lean D (flip)	November 6, 2008
Real Clear Politics	Tossup	November 7, 2008
CQ Politics	Lean D (flip)	November 6, 2008

=== Results ===
Ohio's 15th Congressional District election, 2008
Party	Candidate	Votes	%
Democratic	Mary Jo Kilroy	139,584	45.9
Republican	Steve Stivers	137,272	45.2
Libertarian	Mark M. Noble	14,061	4.6
Independent	Don Elijah Eckhart	12,915	4.3
Total votes		304,978	100
Democratic gain from Republican			

- Race ranking and details from CQ Politics
- Campaign contributions from OpenSecrets
- Stivers (R) vs Kilroy (D) graph of collected poll results from Pollster.com

== District 16 ==
2008 Ohio's 16th congressional district election
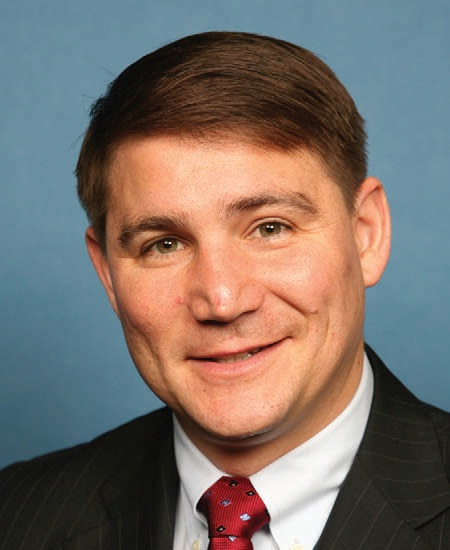

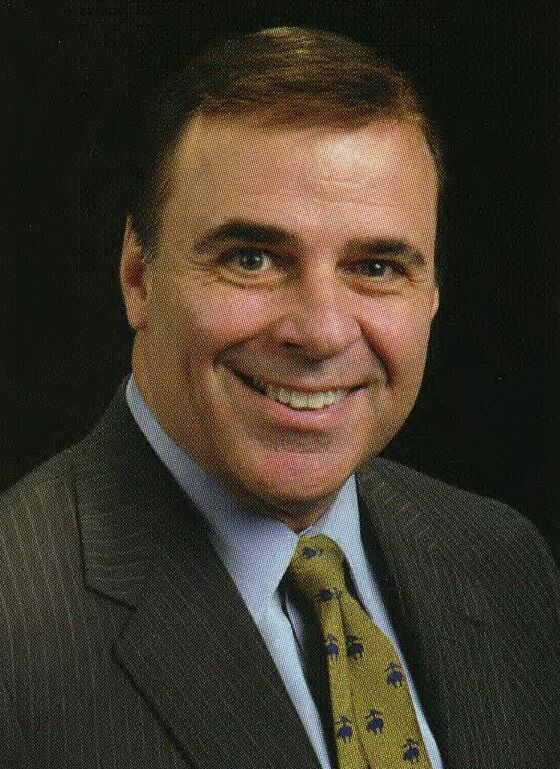
Nominee	John Boccieri	Kirk Schuring
Party	Democratic	Republican
Popular vote	169,044	136,293
Percentage	55.4%	44.6%
- County results Boccieri: 50–60% Schuring: 50–60%
U.S. Representative before election
Ralph Regula
Republican
Elected U.S. Representative
John Boccieri
Democratic

Democratic nominee John Boccieri won against Republican nominee Kirk Schuring. Republican incumbent Ralph Regula did not run for re-election.

=== Predictions ===
Source	Ranking	As of
The Cook Political Report	Lean D (flip)	November 6, 2008
Rothenberg	Likely D (flip)	November 2, 2008
Sabato's Crystal Ball	Lean D (flip)	November 6, 2008
Real Clear Politics	Lean D (flip)	November 7, 2008
CQ Politics	Lean D (flip)	November 6, 2008

=== Results ===
Ohio's 16th Congressional District election, 2008
Party	Candidate	Votes	%
Democratic	John Boccieri	169,044	55.4
Republican	Kirk Schuring	136,293	44.6
Total votes		305,337	100
Democratic gain from Republican			

- Race ranking and details from CQ Politics
- Campaign contributions from OpenSecrets

== District 17 ==
2008 Ohio's 17th congressional district election
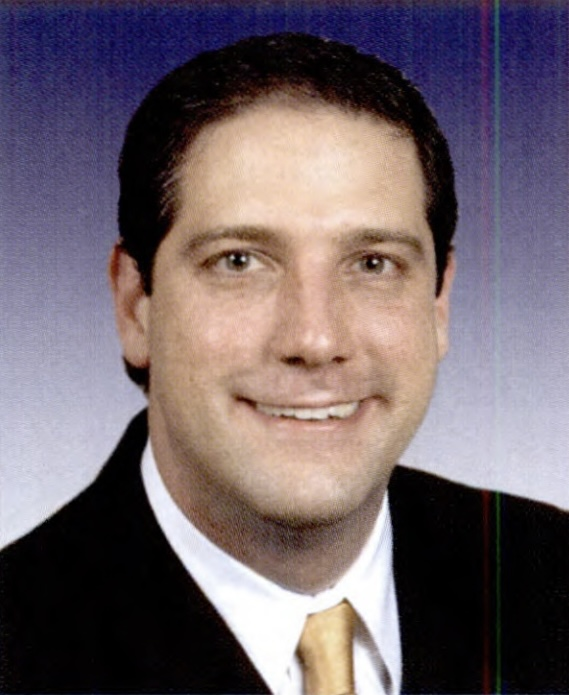

Nominee	Tim Ryan	Duane Grassell
Party	Democratic	Republican
Popular vote	217,556	60,760
Percentage	78.2%	21.8%
- County results Ryan: 70–80% 80–90%
U.S. Representative before election
Tim Ryan
Democratic
Elected U.S. Representative
Tim Ryan
Democratic

Democratic incumbent Tim Ryan won against Republican nominee Duane Grassell.

=== Predictions ===
Source	Ranking	As of
The Cook Political Report	Safe D	November 6, 2008
Rothenberg	Safe D	November 2, 2008
Sabato's Crystal Ball	Safe D	November 6, 2008
Real Clear Politics	Safe D	November 7, 2008
CQ Politics	Safe D	November 6, 2008

=== Results ===
Ohio's 13th Congressional District election, 2008
Party	Candidate	Votes	%
Democratic	Tim Ryan (incumbent)	217,556	78.2
Republican	Duane Grassell	60,760	21.8
Total votes		278,316	100
Democratic hold			

- Race ranking and details from CQ Politics
- Campaign contributions from OpenSecrets

== District 18 ==
2008 Ohio's 18th congressional district election
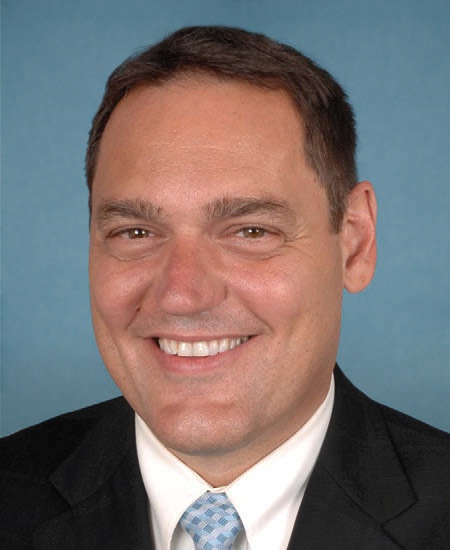

Nominee	Zack Space	Fred Dailey
Party	Democratic	Republican
Popular vote	164,150	110,001
Percentage	59.9%	40.1%
- County results Space: 50–60% 60–70% 70–80% Dailey: 50–60% 60–70%
U.S. Representative before election
Zack Space
Democratic
Elected U.S. Representative
Zack Space
Democratic

Democratic incumbent Zack Space won against Republican nominee Fred Dailey.

=== Predictions ===
Source	Ranking	As of
The Cook Political Report	Likely D	November 6, 2008
Rothenberg	Safe D	November 2, 2008
Sabato's Crystal Ball	Lean D	November 6, 2008
Real Clear Politics	Safe D	November 7, 2008
CQ Politics	Likely D	November 6, 2008

=== Results ===
Ohio's 18th Congressional District election, 2008
Party	Candidate	Votes	%
Democratic	Zack Space (incumbent)	164,150	59.9
Republican	Fred Dailey	110,001	40.1
Total votes		278,316	100
Democratic hold			

- Race ranking and details from CQ Politics
- Campaign contributions from OpenSecrets

Preceded by 2006 elections	United States House of Representatives elections in Ohio; 2008	Succeeded by 2010 elections
