= 2006 Ohio's 2nd congressional district election =

- November 7, 2006
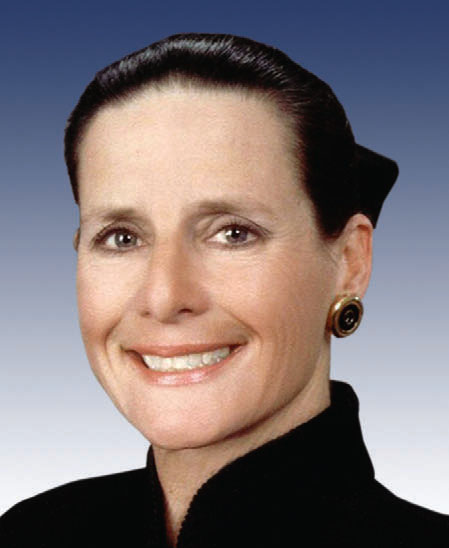

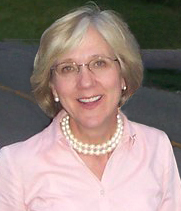
Nominee	Jean Schmidt	Victoria Wells Wulsin
Party	Republican	Democratic
Popular vote	120,112	117,595
Percentage	50.5%	49.4%
- County results Schmidt: 50–60% Wulsin: 50–60% 60–70%
U.S. Representative before election
Jean Schmidt
Republican
Elected U.S. Representative
Jean Schmidt
Republican

The 2006 Ohio's 2nd congressional district election was an election for the United States House of Representatives that took place on November 7, 2006. Incumbent Jean Schmidt, who won the seat in a special election in 2005, ran for reelection. She faced Democrat Victoria Wells Wulsin, a doctor from Indian Hill, in the general election. Results showed that Schmidt won reelection by 1.26%, and Wulsin conceded the race.

== Republican primary ==
=== Challenge from McEwen ===
Schmidt faced a challenge in the May 2 primary from Bob McEwen, the former congressman who finished second in the special primary in 2005. McEwen announced his candidacy on January 18, 2006. Schmidt received help from the national Republican leadership. Dennis Hastert, the Speaker of the House; John Boehner, the House Majority Leader; and Eric Cantor, the House Deputy Majority Whip, participated in fund-raisers for her. Tom Brinkman, the third-place Republican from the 2005 primary, did not run and instead endorsed McEwen.

Schmidt ran commercials claiming McEwen had voted "illegally" in Ohio and was actually a resident of Virginia, while stating McEwen had bounced 160 checks on the House bank. "McEwen ought to be ashamed," the commercial declared. Schmidt filed suit against McEwen seeking to bar him from voting in the primary claiming he was not actually a resident of Ohio. McEwen's commercials against Schmidt noted she had voted in support of Governor Bob Taft's increase in the sales tax and its extension to many services previously untaxed and questioned Schmidt's use of prominent Democratic attorney Stan Chesley to bring her lawsuit against McEwen.

=== False claims by Schmidt ===
==== Endorsements ====
On March 8, The Cincinnati Enquirer reported Representatives Tom Tancredo of Colorado and Steve Chabot of Ohio stated they had not endorsed Schmidt even though Schmidt's campaign site claimed they had. Chabot later said he had endorsed both Schmidt and her primary opponent. Schmidt also claimed an endorsement from the Family Research Council which was repudiated by the organization. After a review, the Ohio Elections Commission found that the Tancredo and Family Research Council endorsement claims were false but did not warrant any reprimand.

==== Second degree ====
WLW-AM reported on March 28 that Schmidt had for years claimed a B.A. in secondary education from the University of Cincinnati awarded in 1986. Schmidt had previously listed two degrees on past campaign websites, but neither her current official or campaign website had the second degree posted. Schmidt's chief of staff, Barry Bennett, told The Plain Dealer Schmidt had completed the requirements for the degree but never filed the paperwork to be awarded a diploma. "I think it's fair to say that she earned it and never collected it," Bennett said.

==== Reprimand ====
On April 27, five days before the May 2 primary against McEwen, the Ohio Elections Commission voted 7–0 to issue Schmidt a public reprimand for "false statements" for her claiming to have a second undergraduate degree from the University of Cincinnati that she was not awarded. The Commission wrote in its letter of reprimand that Schmidt had "reckless disregard for truth.".

Even after her reprimand, Schmidt insisted the error regarding her degrees was a mistake by her staff. On May 1, the day before the election, Schmidt appeared on Bill Cunninham's show on WLW-AM in Cincinnati and was asked by a caller about the OEC reprimand. Schmidt repeated her insistence the error was caused by the designer of her web-site incorrectly listing her teaching certificate as a degree in secondary education and social studies. However Schmidt had been claiming the second bachelor's degree since she first ran for public office in 1989. The Clermont Sun newspaper, in a candidate guide from its November 2, 1989, issue, stated "all candidates were mailed a questionnaire; their responses appear inside [the newspaper]." In her response, Schmidt wrote she possessed "bachelor's degrees in political science and secondary education."

=== Reprimand to McEwen ===
By a 6–1 vote on March 16, the Ohio Elections Commission issued a public reprimand to McEwen for making a false statement when he used the title "Congressman" before his name in the 2005 primary for Rob Portman's unexpired term. No fines or prosecution resulted from the reprimand. Two other complaints against McEwen were dismissed by the commission.

=== Results of the Republican primary ===
Schmidt won with 33,938 votes to 30,297 for McEwen, with two other candidates receiving slightly less than 7,000 votes; her winning margin was thus about 5%.

== Democratic primary ==
In the Democratic primary, Wulsin faced health care administrator James John Parker and civil engineer Jeff Sinnard, who both ran in 2005, and newcomers Gabrielle Downey, a high school teacher, and Thor Jacobs, a building contractor.

The vote results were more widely split than in the Republican primary, with five candidates running and four receiving a double-digit percentage share of the vote. Wulsin won the primary with 36.7% of the vote. Wulsin's vote total in the Democratic primary was 10,455 votes; Jacobs was second with 6,535 votes and Parker got 6,376 votes.

Notable for not running was Paul Hackett, the Democratic candidate for the seat in 2005, who had entered and then withdrawn from the 2006 U.S. Senate race in Ohio. In the 2005 Democratic primary (part of a special election), Wulsin had finished second to Hackett, receiving 3,800 votes (27%).

== November general election ==
The district is heavily Republican, as illustrated by the total Democratic primary vote amounting to only about 40% of the total Republican primary vote. Schmidt had the advantages of a Republican majority in the district, her incumbency, and her opponent's political inexperience. Schmidt won in the general election with 115,817 votes (50.58%) to Wulsin's 112,952 votes (49.32%), with two write-in candidates receiving the remaining tenth of a percent. Schmidt won due to strong showings in Clermont and Warren Counties while Wulsin did well in Scioto, Pike, and Hamilton Counties.

=== Marathon photograph ===
A photo on Schmidt's web site from the 1993 Columbus Marathon showed Schmidt near the marathon finish line with a time clock showing 3:19:06. Nathan J. Noy, a write-in candidate, contended that the photo was fake, saying Schmidt did not cast a shadow while other runners did, and complained to state election officials. A four-member commission panel ruled on August 24, 2006, that there was enough evidence to look into the complaint. A time clock shows 3:19:06 – 3 hours, 19 minutes, 6 seconds — which would have made her one of the top finishers in her age group (she was 42 at the time of the race). Schmidt's website said that as of August 2006 she has completed 60 marathons.

Joseph Braun, Schmidt's attorney, denied that the photograph was fake. He produced what he said was an official race results book, listing Schmidt as the fifth-place finisher in her age group with a time of 3:19:09 — three seconds slower than the time depicted in the photograph. The time clock reflects when the photo was taken, not her official time, Braun said. A spokeswoman for the Columbus Marathon backed Braun, saying later that Schmidt finished fifth among women age 40 to 44 and 930th overall.

On September 7, 2006, a unanimous Ohio Elections Commission tossed out the complaint. Commission members, responding to Noy's lack of evidence and failure to present a single witness, asked Schmidt's Cincinnati attorney, Joseph J. Braun, to prepare a motion detailing his legal fees and other costs. They said they'd consider sanctioning Noy at a future hearing, possibly ordering him to pay all legal fees and costs as well as an unspecified fine. Noy said that until he saw a new, original photo of the finish line, taken one second earlier than the one on Schmidt's website, he was not convinced Schmidt ran the race in 1993.

=== Debates and running challenges ===
In late August, the Columbus Dispatch and the Cincinnati Enquirer both reported that Wulsin had challenged Schmidt to a race: the 5K charity run of the Susan G. Komen Race for the Cure for breast cancer research. In exchange for that race, Wulsin wanted Schmidt—a veteran marathon runner—to agree to hold at least two debates out of the seven Wulsin has been trying to arrange for several weeks. Schmidt replied she was unavailable to run in the Komen event because she is training that day for the upcoming Columbus marathon. Instead, Schmidt counter-challenged Wulsin to compete against her in a 13-mile half marathon race. Wulsin accepted, provided that Schmidt agree to all seven proposed debates. Schmidt's campaign said the incumbent is willing to participate in several debates in October with Wulsin.

On September 6, 2006, the Cincinnati Community Press and Recorder reported that Wulsin and Schmidt would both run the 5K Susan Komen Breast Cancer Foundation Race for the Cure on September 10, 2006, and that the Schmidt campaign has only agreed, so far, to one debate—a 30-minute program scheduled to run on Cincinnati's Channel 12 Newsmakers show on October 15, 2006.

=== Plagiarism accusation ===
On September 22, 2006, the Democratic Congressional Campaign Committee (DCCC) reported Schmidt published "an op-ed about Medicare Part D in the Community Press and Recorder that is almost identical to a press release issued by Congresswoman Deborah Pryce (R-Columbus) on July 10, 2006." For example, the first paragraph of Pryce's press release states: "Two and a half years ago, Congress delivered on a promise we made to the American people by passing sweeping Medicare reform, including a comprehensive Medicare prescription drug benefit to, for the first time, give America’s seniors access to affordable prescription drugs. As we have now passed the May 15 deadline, the evidence is in and we have much to celebrate: the Medicare prescription drug benefit is working, and seniors are saving money."

In comparison, the first paragraph of Schmidt's op-ed states that: " Two-and-a-half years ago, Republicans delivered on a promise we made to the American people by passing sweeping Medicare reform, including a comprehensive Medicare prescription drug benefit to give America's seniors access to affordable prescription drugs. Now that the program is off the ground, the evidence is in and we have much to celebrate: the Medicare prescription drug benefit is working, and seniors are saving money. Over 90 percent of all Medicare beneficiaries now have drug coverage - that's 38 million seniors. As of this summer in Ohio, 1.4 million more seniors have prescription drug coverage than before the benefit began."

=== Wulsin's "cowards" ad ===
Wulsin ran a television advertisement using the widely broadcast footage of Schmidt criticizing Democratic Representative John Murtha, a Marine Corps veteran, by telling him that "cowards cut and run, Marines never do." Schmidt's remark, in a 2005 debate about the Iraq War, had been widely criticized at the time, and she later apologized to Murtha. (See Jean Schmidt#"Cowards" controversy.) Schmidt protested that Wulsin's use of her speech violated a House rule against the incorporation of a broadcast of House proceedings in a campaign ad. Wulsin's campaign responded that Wulsin, as a nonmember, was not bound by the rule. Wulsin's spokesman also said of Schmidt, "If she didn't want people to see this ad, then she shouldn't have given that speech."

=== Projections ===
On September 21, 2006, the Cincinnati Enquirer reported: "A SurveyUSA poll out today shows Republican Rep. Jean Schmidt tied with her Democratic challenger." The actual percentages were 45 percent for Schmidt, 42 percent for Wulsin and 12 percent undecided; with a margin of error of 4.5 points in the poll of 497 likely voters, the result was a statistical tie. A June 2006 poll by the Momentum Analysis polling organization, which says it "helps forward Democratic and progressive causes", found challenger Wulsin tied at 44 percent with incumbent Schmidt and 11 percent undecided. The June 2006 poll found that Wulsin led Schmidt 50 percent to 37 percent in Hamilton County. (Hamilton County is divided between the Ohio's 1st congressional district and Ohio's 2nd congressional district.)

== Polls ==
Source	Date	Wulsin (D)	Schmidt (R)	Undecided	Margin of error
SurveyUSA	November 1, 2006	48%	45%		-/+ 4
SurveyUSA	October 17, 2006	40%	48%	12%	-/+ 4
Majority Watch	October 10, 2006	48%	45%	6%	-/+ 3
SurveyUSA	September 21, 2006	42%	45%	12%	-/+ 4
Momentum Analysis	June 2006	44%	44%	11%	-/+ 4
