= Lawson Wulsin =

Lawson Wulsin

Lawson Reed Wulsin (born June 17, 1951) is a professor emeritus of psychiatry and family medicine at the University of Cincinnati College of Medicine. Wulsin specializes in psychosomatic medicine and from 1995-2019 was the training director for the University of Cincinnati Family Medicine Psychiatry Residency Program.

Wulsin is the author of two books: 1) "Toxic Stress: How Stress Is Making Us Ill and What We Can Do About It" (Cambridge University Press 2024), which explores the fascinating medical and social mysteries of our stress response system and how stress affects illness, and 2) "Treating the Aching Heart" (Vanderbilt University Press 2007) which "presents a new view of depression as a broad-reaching illness with a distinct neurobiology that influences the most up-to-date model of heart disease." Other research by Wulsin includes "Depressive symptoms, coronary heart disease, and overall mortality in the Framingham Heart Study," published in Psychosomatic Medicine; "Can mortality studies change clinical care and health policy?" in Journal of Psychosomatic Research; "Is depression a major risk factor for coronary disease? A systematic review of the epidemiologic evidence," in Harvard Review of Psychiatry; "Do depressive symptoms increase the risk for the onset of coronary disease? A systematic quantitative review” in Psychosomatic Medicine; and "A systematic review of the mortality of depression," in Psychosomatic Medicine.

Wulsin holds an M.D. from the University of Cincinnati and is a graduate of Harvard College. Wulsin is married to Victoria Wells Wulsin, an epidemiologist and former democratic congressional candidate (2006, 2008). They live in Cincinnati, Ohio. He is a grandson of Lucien Wulsin, a founder of the Baldwin Piano Company and the son of Dr. John Wulsin.
