= Jean Schmidt =

American politician (born 1951)

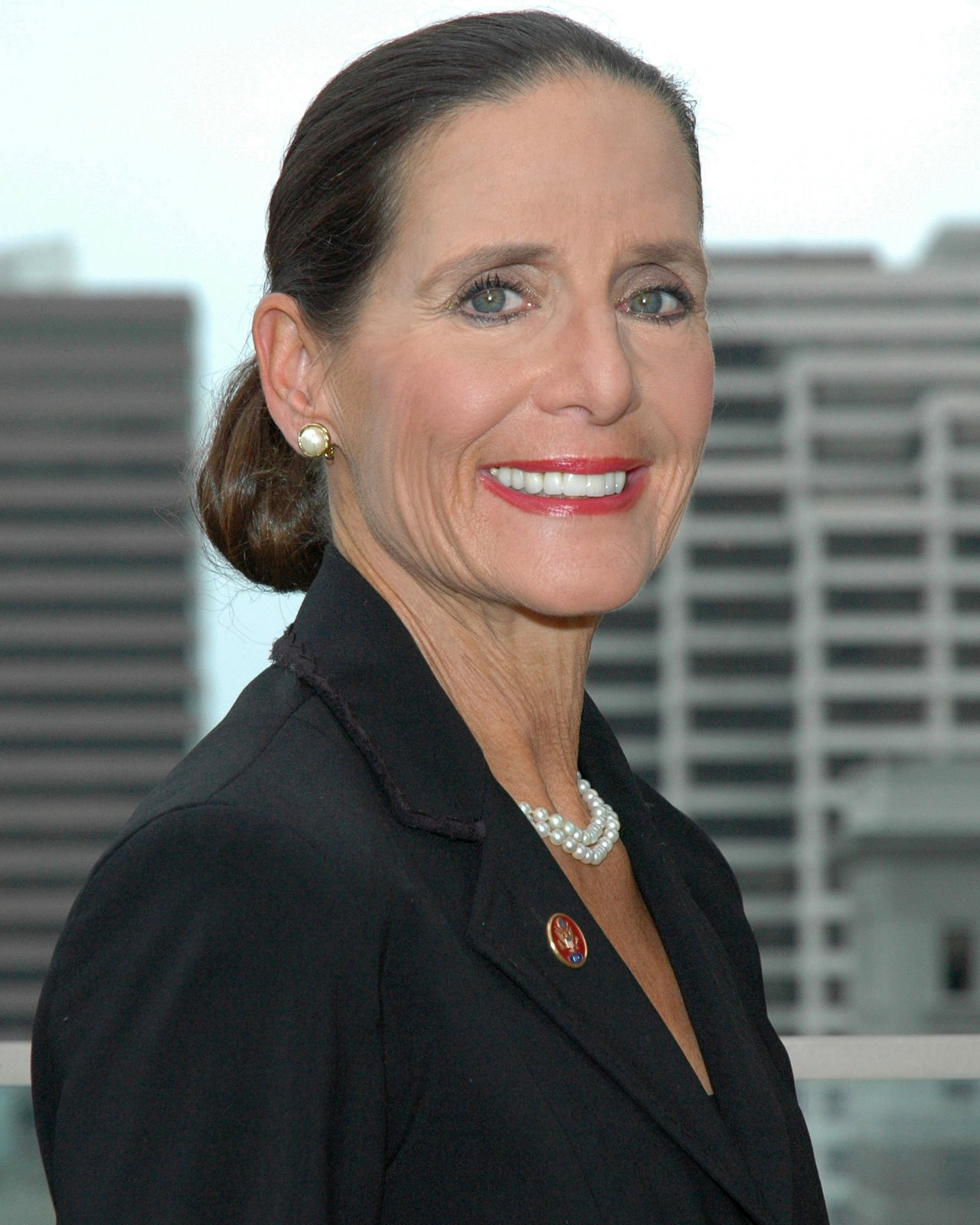
- Official portrait, 2008

Member of the Ohio House of Representatives
- Incumbent
- Assumed office January 4, 2021
- Preceded by: John Becker
- Constituency: 65th district (2021–2022); 62nd district (2023–present)
- In office January 3, 2001 – December 31, 2004
- Preceded by: Sam Bateman
- Succeeded by: Joe Uecker
- Constituency: 71st district (2001–2002); 66th district (2003–2004)

Member of the U.S. House of Representatives from Ohio's 2nd district
- In office August 2, 2005 – January 3, 2013 (Note: Schmidt's official service begins on the date of the special election, while she was not sworn in until September 6, 2005.)
- Preceded by: Rob Portman
- Succeeded by: Brad Wenstrup

Personal details
- Born: Jeannette Mary Hoffman; November 29, 1951 (age 74) Cincinnati, Ohio, U.S.
- Party: Republican
- Spouse: Peter Schmidt
- Children: 1
- Education: University of Cincinnati (BA)

Jeannette Mary Schmidt (née Hoffman; born November 29, 1951) is an American politician who is a state representative in Ohio's 62nd district. She was a U.S. Representative for Ohio's 2nd congressional district, serving from 2005 to 2013. She is a member of the Republican Party.

Schmidt was first elected to Congress in a 2005 special election. In 2012, she lost renomination in the Republican primary to Brad Wenstrup.

== Early life and education ==
Schmidt, born Jeannette Marie Hoffman in Cincinnati, Ohio, is a lifelong resident of Clermont County's Miami Township, along the eastern shore of Little Miami River near Milford and Loveland. One of four children (two daughters, two sons) of Augustus ("Gus") and Jeannette Hoffman, she has a twin sister, Jennifer Black. Her father made his money in the savings and loan industry, then ran an auto racing team that competed in the Indianapolis 500.

She earned a B.A. in political science from the University of Cincinnati in 1974. Schmidt worked in her father's bank, the Midwestern Savings Association, as a branch manager from 1971 to 1978. Schmidt was a delegate to the Republican National Convention in 1984. She was a fitness instructor from 1984 to 1986, when she began a four-year career as a schoolteacher.

== Early political career ==
Schmidt was elected as a Miami Township trustee in 1989. When Clermont County Commissioner Jerry McBride resigned in 1991 to become a judge, Schmidt was one of four candidates to replace him, but wasn't appointed. In her 1993 bid for reelection, she finished first in a field of four, taking 3,639 votes.

One major issue during her service on the board of trustees was the city of Milford annexing parts of the township. She and other trustees lobbied the Ohio General Assembly for new laws to protect townships from such annexations. In 1993, a panel of Miami Township residents recommended the township incorporate to protect itself from annexations, to have greater control over its territory, and to obtain more money from the state. However, Schmidt as a trustee was not a participant in this effort, saying she had to be a "cheerleader" on the sides.

In 1995, she traveled to Russia to offer instruction about political campaigning in a country that had little experience of free elections. On her trip she ran in Moscow's Red Square: "Did I ever feel unsafe? No. And would I jog through Central Park in New York? No way."

Schmidt was reelected to a third term as trustee in 1997. She resigned her trustee seat to enter the Ohio House. The remaining two trustees appointed Mary Makley Wolff to the remainder of the term.

== Ohio General Assembly ==
=== Ohio House of Representatives ===
==== Elections ====
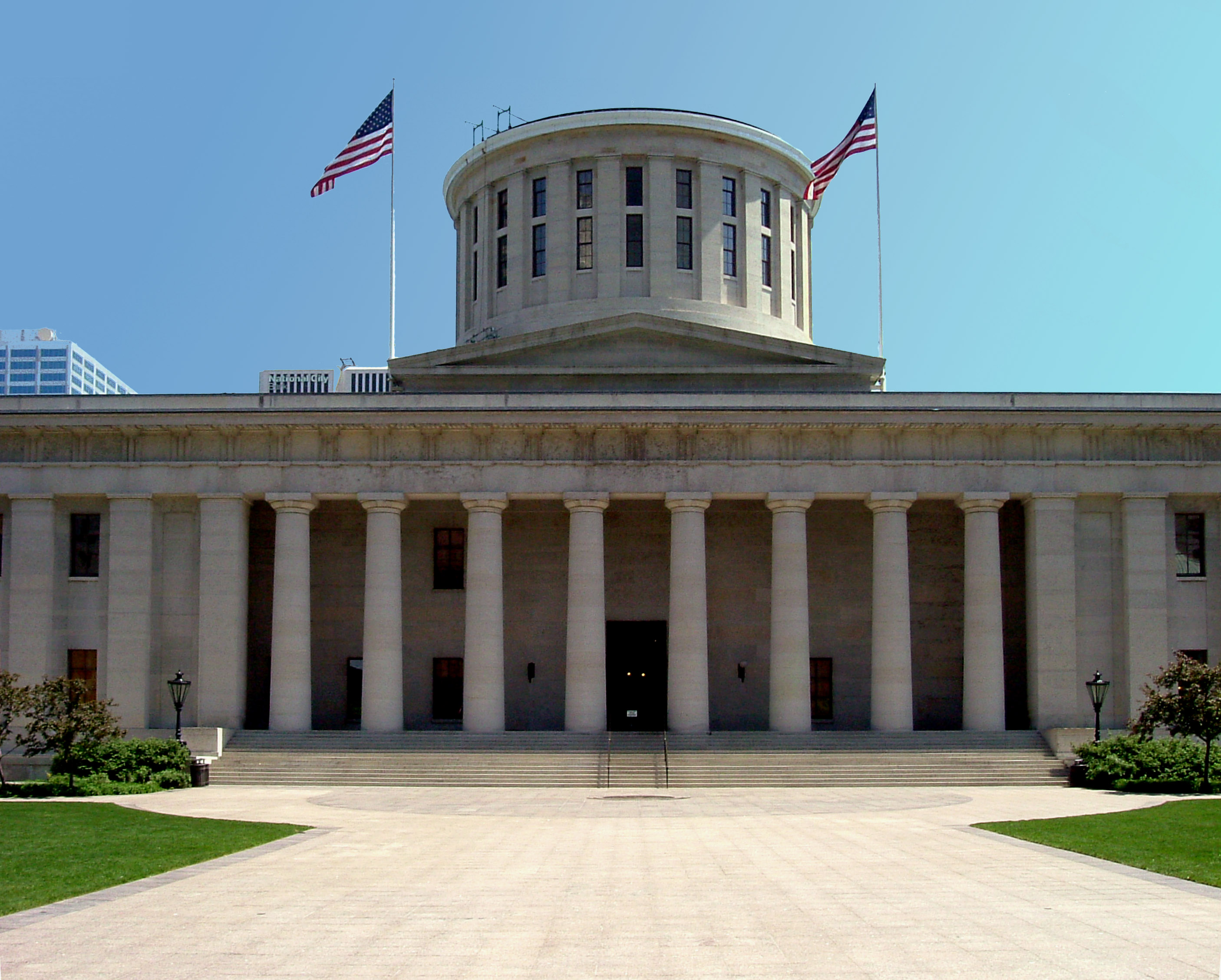
The Ohio Statehouse

In 2000, Schmidt ran for the Ohio House of Representatives seat being vacated by Sam Bateman, who was prevented by term limits from running again.

Her district was entirely within Clermont County, containing Miami Township as well as Batavia, Goshen, Pierce, Stonelick and Union Townships, plus the villages of Amelia, Batavia and the city of Milford, and the Clermont County part of the city of Loveland. After the redistricting necessitated by the 2000 census, her district became the 66th and contained the same territory minus Pierce and Stonelick Townships."

==== Tenure ====
The Cincinnati Enquirer wrote she introduced and passed bills "remarkable in number and quality for a neophyte lawmaker." She sponsored legislation on the Clermont County courts, limiting the ability of public employees to collect both pension and salary simultaneously ("double dipping"), urban townships, and protecting townships from annexations of their territory by cities, all of which were passed into law. She also pushed legislation on the health of women, suicide prevention, abstinence education, and to "lock killers away for good" by making it easier for judges to sentence murderers to life terms. Schmidt also supported Ohio's concealed carry law.

==== Committee assignments ====
In the House she served on the Finance and Appropriations; Human Services and Aging; Banking, Pensions and Securities; and Public Utilities Committees. She was excited to be in the Statehouse: "Oh my God, I'm really a state representative" she was overheard telling a fellow freshman. In 2002, she was elected to the 125th General Assembly without opposition in both the primary and general elections.

==== Second stint in the Ohio House of Representatives ====
In 2020, Schmidt was elected to a second stint in the Ohio House of Representatives from the 65th district. She took office on January 1, 2021.

=== Ohio State Senate ===
==== 2004 election ====
In 2004, Schmidt ran for the 14th District seat in the Ohio Senate to replace Senate President Doug White, who was retiring. The Senate seat included Clermont, Brown, Adams and Scioto counties and part of Lawrence County. Her opponent for the Republican nomination was Tom Niehaus, a fellow member of the Ohio House from New Richmond whose 88th District represented the half of Clermont County outside her district plus Brown and Adams Counties to the east. Schmidt told the Enquirer "The fear from many of the people I meet is that because the next senator will come from Clermont County, they will be underrepresented. But if you know anything about me, I don't under-represent anybody." She also said she worried about the state budget: "We do have a history of overspending in Ohio. But it's not just recent history. It's a 40-year-old habit." The Enquirer was dismayed by advertisements from the Ohio Taxpayers Association "twisting the two candidates' voting records to Schmidt's advantage" and endorsed Niehaus.

Schmidt had endorsements from key state leaders such as Ohio State Treasurer Joe Deters and Speaker of the Ohio House Larry Householder. The campaign was marred by allegations that Householder's staff had improperly tried to obtain Niehaus's withdrawal from the race and that Householder had told Niehaus's supporters to donate money to Schmidt's campaign. In the initial count of the Republican primary vote on March 2, 2004, she led by just 62 votes. A recount was automatically ordered, which reversed the outcome. Schmidt ultimately lost by just 22 votes: 17,076 (49.9%) to Niehaus's 17,098 (50%). She told The Cincinnati Enquirer on election night "This is the way my whole life has been—one tough race after another."

== U.S. House of Representatives ==
=== Elections ===
==== 2005 ====
2005 Republican primary results by county: Schmidt: 20–30%; 40–50%; McEwen: 30–40%; 40–50%; 50–60%

When President George W. Bush nominated Rob Portman, who had just been elected to a sixth full term, to be U.S. Trade Representative, Schmidt and ten other Republicans entered the race for his seat in a 2005 special election. Schmidt's campaign literature noted her anti-abortion voting record, her opposition to same-sex marriage, and her high rating from the NRA Political Victory Fund. Pat DeWine was one of Schmidt's opponents, and his marriage became an issue in the campaign. In 2004, DeWine's opponent ran ads stating that DeWine had left his pregnant wife and their two children for a mistress who worked as a lobbyist. In her stump speech, Schmidt made it a point to emphasize the duration of her own marriage, stating, "I am a woman of character who has been married for twenty-nine years."

On June 14, 2005, in an upset, Schmidt finished first in the Republican primary with 31% of the vote. Two days after the primary, an editorial cartoon in The Cincinnati Enquirer, commented on DeWine's marriage having been such a factor in the primary; the cartoon showed Schmidt asking Paul Hackett, who had won the Democratic primary, "You have a good marriage. I have a good marriage. What the heck are we going to campaign about?"

Schmidt faced Hackett in the August 2, 2005, special election. Hackett criticized Schmidt as a "rubber stamp" for Governor Bob Taft's "failed policies", and claimed she would continue in that role for George W. Bush if elected. At their debate at Chatfield College, Hackett said, "If you think America is on the right track and we need more of the same, I'm not your candidate" and asked, "Are you better off today than you were five years ago?", echoing Ronald Reagan's question in his debate with Jimmy Carter in 1980.

A month before the election, the inspector general of the Ohio General Assembly announced he was investigating three legislators for accepting gifts and failing to report them. Schmidt was implicated, but could not be investigated because she was no longer a member of the Ohio house. On October 24, 2004, the legislators had accepted dinner at Nicola's Ristorante on Sycamore Street in Cincinnati's Over-the-Rhine neighborhood and Cincinnati Bengals tickets from a lobbyist for pharmaceutical company Chiron. Schmidt said she thought her $644 gift was from former Bengals player Boomer Esiason, who was, like Chiron, interested in cystic fibrosis. Schmidt repaid the lobbyist for the cost of the entertainment.

Hackett hammered on Schmidt's ethics. When she denied she knew or ever met Thomas Noe, at the center of the Coingate investment scandal at the Ohio Bureau of Workers' Compensation, Hackett produced minutes from a meeting of the Ohio Board of Regents that showed Schmidt had indeed met with Noe, once a regent. On July 29, the Toledo Blade reported on a 2001 e-mail from Taft's assistant Jon Allison complaining Schmidt was "bugging" him about setting up an Internet lottery for Cincinnati businessman Roger Ach, who gave her a $1,000 contribution the next year. Schmidt spokesman Fritz Wenzel said the candidate did not recall any conversations with the governor about Ach's business.

The candidates participated in two debates. The first was held on July 7 at Chatfield College in St. Martin in Brown County, moderated by Jack Atherton of WXIX-TV. The second debate was held July 26 at the Ohio Valley Career and Technical Center in West Union in Adams County. The two also made joint appearances on WCET-TV's Forum on July 28 and WKRC-TV's Newsmakers on July 31.

Schmidt defeated Hackett, 52%–48%. Schmidt's margin of victory was the worst showing of any Republican in the district since 1974. Nevertheless, she became the second Republican woman elected to Congress from Ohio in her own right (after Deborah Pryce) and the first woman to represent southwestern Ohio in Congress. In her victory speech, Schmidt declared:

We began this race way back in late March, and no one had thought we'd be the focus of the national media or be the so-called first test of the Republican Party and the Bush mandate. Well, ladies and gentlemen, we passed that test.

==== 2006 ====
2006 Republican primary results by county Schmidt: 40–50%; 50–60%; McEwen: 40–50%; 50–60%; 60–70%

During Schmidt's re-election bid, there were several controversies, which affected her campaign. One was a March 2006 report about Schmidt's past claims that she had a B.A. in secondary education from the University of Cincinnati, awarded in 1986. Schmidt's defenders pointed out that neither her current official or campaign website had the second degree posted, and said that Schmidt had completed the requirements for the degree but never filed the paperwork to be awarded a diploma. On April 27, five days before the May 2 primary, the Ohio Elections Commission voted 7–0 to issue Schmidt a public reprimand for "false statements" for her claiming to have that second degree. The commission also found that Schmidt had made false claims of being endorsed by several organizations, but that these did not warrant any reprimand.

Schmidt won the Republican primary, defeating former U.S. Congressman Bob McEwen 48%–43%. In the general election, she defeated Democrat Victoria Wells Wulsin by a margin of 2,865 votes (1.3%).

==== 2008 ====
2008 Republican primary results by county Schmidt 50–60% Schmidt 60–70%

On January 20, 2008, Schmidt received the Hamilton County Republican Party's endorsement for the March 4 Republican primary. In the Republican primary, she defeated State Representative Tom Brinkman Jr. 58%–40%.

The Schmidt campaign sent out a fundraising letter accusing her Democratic opponent, Victoria Wells Wulsin, of harboring a "contempt for the culture of life" that led her to "participate in grotesque medical experiments" involving injections of "malaria virus" into AIDS patients in Africa and China without their consent. The "grotesque medical experiments" charge appears to be a reference to 2004 work that Wulsin did with the Heimlich Institute in Ohio. She examined data that was supplied to her as part of a literature review, taken from ongoing studies, of experimental AIDS therapies that Wulsin concluded had potential. "She never participated in any of the studies," said Wulsin communications director Kevin Franck. "She was never in a position to stop any of them while they were in progress ... Jean Schmidt knew that those complaints and those allegations had no merit when she mailed the letter." There is also no such thing as a malaria virus, as malaria is caused by protozoans.

In October, Schmidt was struck by a hit and run driver while jogging, and was diagnosed with two broken ribs and two fractured vertebrae. The injuries were not diagnosed immediately after the accident. However, the week following the accident she was embarking on a weekend fact-finding visit to Afghanistan when severe pain caused her to pass out while landing at a U.S. Air Force Base in Germany. As a sign of respect, her Democratic opponent, Victoria Wulsin, suspended her campaign while Schmidt rested at home.

On Election Day, Schmidt defeated Wulsin and independent David Krikorian, 45%–37%–18%.

==== 2010 ====
2010 Republican primary results by county Schmidt 40–50% Schmidt 50–60% Schmidt 60–70% Schmidt 70–80%

In the Republican primary, she defeated County Commissioner Mike Kilburn, Debbi Alsfelder, and Tim Martz 62%–22%–9%–7%. In the general election, she won re-election to a third term by defeating Surya Yalamanchili 58%–35%.

==== 2012 ====
2012 Republican primary results by county Wenstrup: 50–60%; Schmidt: 40–50%; 50–60%; 60–70%

In the March Republican primary, Schmidt was unexpectedly defeated by Iraq war veteran Brad Wenstrup 49%–43%. She carried six counties (all located in eastern part of the CD), while Wenstrup only won two counties (both located in the western part of CD): Hamilton County (59%) and Clermont County (50%).

=== Tenure ===
==== Swearing In ====
Schmidt was sworn in on the evening of September 6, 2005. (Ordinarily, representatives chosen in special elections take office immediately, but the House was in its August recess at the time of the election.) In her maiden speech, Schmidt said:

I stand here today in the same shoes, though with a slightly higher heel, as thousands of Members who have taken the same oath before me. I am mindful of what is expected of me both by this hallowed institution and the hundreds of thousands of Americans I am blessed to represent. I am the lowest-ranking Member of this body, the very bottom rung of the ladder; and I am privileged to hold that title. . .

I pledge to walk in the shoes of my colleagues and refrain from name-calling or the questioning of character. It is easy to quickly sink to the lowest form of political debate. Harsh words often lead to headlines, but walking this path is not a victimless crime. This great House pays the price.

So at this moment, I begin my tenure in this Chamber, uncertain of what history will say of my tenure here. I come here green with only a desire to make our great country even greater. We have much work to do. In that spirit, I pledge to each of you that any disagreements we may have are just that and no more. Walking in each other's shoes takes effort and pause; however, it is my sincere hope that I never lose the patience to view each of you as human beings first, God's creatures, and foremost. I deeply appreciate this opportunity to serve with each of you. I very much look forward to getting to know you better.

==== Environment ====
Schmidt has called for increasing use of ethanol and drilling in Alaska's Arctic National Wildlife Refuge. Schmidt told The Cincinnati Post "What's really important is to adopt an environmental policy that advances the American economy and national security. I supported the energy bill recently passed by the U.S. House that will expand the use of alternative energy sources and additives like ethanol."

==== Abortion and birth control ====
Schmidt is anti-abortion. When she launched her candidacy, she was president of the Right-to-Life of Greater Cincinnati. At the Chatfield College debate, Schmidt said Roe v. Wade was "a flawed law made by activist judges" and would "love to see" it reversed.

Schmidt's proposed HB 598 would ban abortions in Ohio if Roe v. Wade were overturned, with no exception for rape or incest. Schmidt defended the lack of exceptions to critics, saying that a raped 13-year-old girl who became pregnant should consider it what she called an "opportunity" to help the child they would be forced to carry to term become a "productive human being." After the repeal of Roe, Schmidt reaffirmed that she would not offer any exceptions for rape or incest.

She has refused to rule out banning married couples from being allowed to use birth control.

==== Iraq War ====
Schmidt appeared in public with a button in her lapel containing a photograph of Keith Matthew Maupin, who was at the time the only prisoner of war of the Iraq campaign who had not been freed and who was a native of Clermont County.

== Controversies ==
=== "Coward" remarks ===
On November 18, 2005, the House debated a Republican-sponsored resolution, H. Res. 572, calling for the immediate withdrawal of troops from Iraq. It was prompted by the call of John P. Murtha Jr., a Democrat from Pennsylvania, who introduced H.J. Res. 73, which called for the redeployment of American forces as soon as possible. In response, Armed Services Committee chairman Duncan L. Hunter of California introduced H. Res. 571, which the Republican leadership admitted was intended to demonstrate that calls for troop withdrawal were "out of the mainstream." Democrats in turn roundly criticized the Hunter resolution as a sham that misstated Murtha's position.

During debate on adopting the rule for debating the resolution, H. Res. 563, Schmidt said:

Yesterday I stood at Arlington National Cemetery attending the funeral of a young Marine in my district. He believed in what we were doing is the right thing and had the courage to lay his life on the line to do it. A few minutes ago I received a call from Colonel Danny Bubp, Ohio Representative from the 88th district in the House of Representatives. He asked me to send Congress a message: Stay the course. He also asked me to send Congressman Murtha a message, that cowards cut and run, Marines never do. Danny and the rest of America and the world want the assurance from this body—that we will see this through.

Schmidt's remarks threw the House into an uproar and earned her the sobriquet "Mean Jean". Many Democrats saw it as an unwarranted attack against Murtha, a 38-year Marine Corps veteran. After she said "cowards cut and run, Marines never do," angry Democrats nearly drowned out her words. Victor F. Snyder, a former Marine, of Arkansas demanded that Schmidt's remarks be "taken down." Under this disciplinary procedure, the House clerk would have re-read Schmidt's words and the presiding officer (at the time, Michael K. Simpson of Idaho) would have ruled whether they were parliamentary. Had they been ruled unparliamentary, Schmidt would not have been able to speak for the rest of the day without permission.

After 10 minutes, Schmidt asked for and received permission to withdraw her remarks and apologized to Murtha.

A spokeswoman for Bubp said that the state representative "did not mention Congressman Murtha by name nor did he mean to disparage Congressman Murtha" and that he felt "the words that Congresswoman Schmidt chose did not represent their conversation." The Cincinnati Enquirer reported Bubp said "he never mentioned ... Murtha . . . by name when talking with Schmidt, and he would never call a fellow Marine a coward."

=== Fake endorsements ===
On March 8, 2006, The Cincinnati Enquirer reported Representatives Tom Tancredo of Colorado and Steve Chabot of Ohio stated they had not endorsed Schmidt even though Schmidt's campaign site claimed they had. Chabot later said he had endorsed both Schmidt and her primary opponent. Schmidt also claimed an endorsement from the Family Research Council, which was repudiated by the organization. After a review, the Ohio Elections Commission found that the Tancredo and Family Research Council endorsement claims were false but did not warrant any reprimand.

=== Inaccurate claim about second bachelor's degree ===
WLW-AM reported on March 28, 2006, that Schmidt had, since 1989, claimed a B.A. in secondary education from the University of Cincinnati awarded in 1986. Schmidt had previously listed two degrees on candidate guides, her official Ohio House bio, and past campaign websites. But after her election to Congress, neither her current official or campaign website had the second degree posted. Schmidt's chief of staff, Barry Bennett, told The Plain Dealer Schmidt had completed the requirements for the degree but never filed the paperwork to be awarded a diploma. "I think it's fair to say that she earned it and never collected it," Bennett said.

On April 27, five days before the May 2 primary against McEwen, the Ohio Elections Commission voted 7–0 to issue Schmidt a public reprimand for "false statements" for her claiming to have a second undergraduate degree from the University of Cincinnati that she was not awarded. The Commission wrote in its letter of reprimand that Schmidt had "reckless disregard for truth."

=== Barack Obama birth certificate ===
At the Voice of America Tea Party on September 5, 2009, Schmidt, in response to a woman who said that Barack Obama "cannot be a president by our constitution," replied, "I agree with you, but the courts don't." Schmidt's statement to the woman appeared to contradict a statement Schmidt made in July 2009 to Loveland Magazine in which she said that "The President is indeed a Citizen of this country" and that she "voted as a Member of the House to certify the vote of the Electoral College electing him as our President."

=== Armenian genocide denial ===
A few days before the 2008 congressional election, independent candidate David Krikorian published a letter stating that "Jean Schmidt has taken $30,000 in blood money from Turkish government sponsored political action committees to deny the slaughter of 1.5 million Armenian men, women and children by the Ottoman Turkish Government during World War I." Finally, the flier asserted that it could be adequately verified by the Federal Election Commission's website. He repeated the letter to the Ohio Elections Commission.

The Ohio Elections Commission issued a split decision on the case, failing to find that all of the preceding three remarks had been published in violation of ORC 3517.21(B)(10) by clear and convincing evidence. In a series of 4 panel votes, Commissioners affirmed that Turkish American funds are a primary source of support for Rep. Schmidt's political campaign, but chided Krikorian for statements related to Turkish Government funding of his opponent, because such a funding would be illegal. The votes were taken after a panel decision to disregard testimony provided regarding the Armenian genocide and its denial, which was criticized by David Krikorian's party and supporters. Schmidt also attempted, to no avail, to press criminal charges against Krikorian for his statements. Sibel Edmonds, a former FBI translator, testified on behalf of Krikorian during the Ohio Elections Commission hearing and spoke about Turkey's connections to Schmidt.

In October 2010, a federal court rejected David Krikorian's appeal.

In June 2010, Schmidt unsuccessfully filed a $6.8 million lawsuit against David Krikorian.

=== Illegal gifts from Turkish Coalition of America ===
==== House of Representatives investigation ====
In July 2011, the House Ethics Committee announced that it was investigating accusations that Schmidt had accepted roughly $500,000 in free legal services from a Turkish-American interest group (the Turkish Coalition of America). Schmidt said that she hadn't received a bill for the legal services in question, and that she had been waiting for more than a year for guidance from the ethics committee on the proper procedure to pay the bill. In August 2011, the Ethics Committee rendered its decision, holding that the interest group's payment for legal services in connection with her proceedings against Krikorian had been improper, and ordering Schmidt to repay the group $500,000.

On September 21, 2011, the Citizens for Responsibility and Ethics in Washington added Schmidt to its "most corrupt" list for "accept[ing] hundreds of thousands of dollars in free legal services from lawyers hired by an interest group that appreciated her legislative assistance" as well as "fail[ure] to report the free legal services as gifts in her disclosure forms." In October 2011, CREW requested that the Office of Congressional Ethics investigate whether Schmidt lied to the House Ethics Committee regarding inquiries into free legal services.

As part of the Ethics Committee ruling, Schmidt was given permission to establish a legal expense fund to help refund the illegal gifts from the Turkish Coalition of America. Through September 30, 2012—approximately one year after establishing the fund—Schmidt has raised a total of $5000 and made no payments from the legal expense fund to repay the illegal gifts.

The sole contribution to the legal expense fund, $5000, came from a Turkish linked aviation firm, Global Eclipse, LLC.

Schmidt left office on January 4 of 2013. Under House Rules, she was required to file one last financial disclosure statement by February 4. She failed to do so, but on March 1, 2013, she finally filed that form disclosing that she left Congress owing the Turkish Coalition of America a debt in the range between $515,000 and $1.05 million.

==== FEC investigation ====
In August 2011, David Krikorian filed a complaint with the Federal Election Commission (FEC) alleging that the illegal gifts received by Schmidt from the Turkish Coalition of America were also illegal campaign contributions. On January 13, 2015, the FEC issued its findings; that the Turkish Coalition of America and its president, Lincoln McCurdy, had violated 52 U.S.C.§ 30118 a) and that the Schmidt for Congress Committee had violated 52 U.S.C. §§ 30118 a) and 30104 b) provisions of the Federal Election Campaign Act of 1971.

On June 14, 2016, Schmidt's campaign committee entered into a conciliation agreement with the FEC, agreeing that the Turkish Coalition of America's payment of over $600,000 of her legal bills constituted an illegal campaign contribution and that her campaign had accepted illegal campaign contributions from the Turkish Coalition of America and had failed to report those contributions. Schmidt for Congress agreed to pay a nominal fine. The FEC accepted a nominal fine because "the Committee has plans to terminate, has very little cash, and has a limited ability to raise any additional funds."

The Turkish Coalition of America agreed to pay a $25,000 fine as a result of its illegal campaign contributions.

== Personal life ==
Schmidt and her husband, Peter W. Schmidt have one child, a daughter, Emilie (born in 1978). A Roman Catholic, she has been a member of Elizabeth Ann Seton Church since 1978. She is a marathon runner.

Schmidt was elected chairman of the Greater Cincinnati Right to Life organization in 2005. Schmidt was a trustee of the Clermont County Library from 1980 to 1992 and 1994 to 2000. She was reappointed to the board in 2005. She is also a director of the Mercy Hospital Clermont Foundation Board.

== See also ==
- Women in the United States House of Representatives

U.S. House of Representatives
Preceded by Rob Portman	Member of the U.S. House of Representatives from Ohio's 2nd congressional district 2005–2013	Succeeded by Brad Wenstrup
U.S. order of precedence (ceremonial)
Preceded by Diane Black as Former U.S. Representative	Order of precedence of the United States as Former U.S. Representative	Succeeded by Jim Renacci as Former U.S. Representative
