= David Krikorian =

American businessman

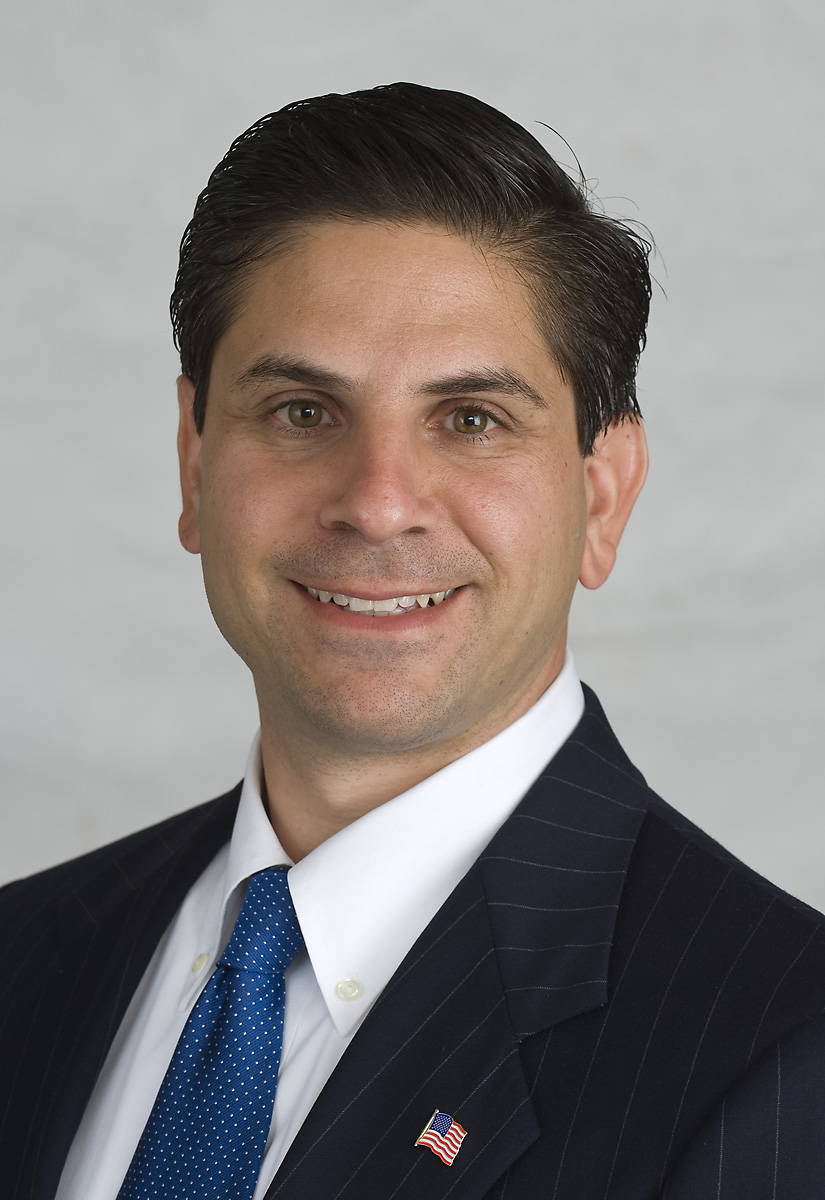
- Born: November 19, 1968 (age 56); Rhode Island, United States
- Occupation: Businessman

David Krikorian (born November 19, 1968) is an American businessman and former candidate for Ohio's 2nd congressional district running as both an Independent and a Democratic candidate in several races.

== Personal life ==
David Krikorian was born and raised in Rhode Island. He is married to Elena Krikorian and they have three children.

Krikorian holds a B.A. in economics and finance from Bentley University and an M.B.A. from the University of Cincinnati. He is the founder and managing partner of Parody Productions LLC located in Cincinnati, OH, which produces playing cards and jigsaw puzzles. Krikorian is also the founder of Fabricon3D, which provides 3D printing services and founded Nashville Hot, a Nashville style hot chicken restaurant in 2015 located in Crescent Springs, Kentucky. Previous employers include Fidelity Investments, Deloitte & Touche, Cincinnati Bell and Tom & Chee.

Krikorian's grandparents (maternal & paternal) are survivors of the Armenian genocide. Krikorian is a member of the Armenian Apostolic Church.

== Independent candidacy ==
Krikorian ran as an Independent candidate for United States Congress in 2008 and came in third behind Republican incumbent Representative Jean Schmidt and Democratic challenger Victoria Wulsin, receiving 17.71 percent of the vote after endorsements from the Cincinnati Fraternal Order of Police, the Ohio Libertarian Party, and the Georgetown News Democrat.

== Entrance to the Democratic Party ==
In 2009, Krikorian announced that he would seek the Democratic Party nomination for the Second District in 2010. He was narrowly defeated by marketing executive Surya Yalamanchili after Republican Congresswoman Jean Schmidt made false allegations about Krikorian. Rep. Schmidt won an easy re-election in the 2010 general election against Yalamanchili.

== Controversies ==
=== Civil lawsuit ===
In June 2010, Jean Schmidt sued Krikorian in Ohio civil court for a total of $6.8 million in perceived damages to her image. The lawsuit was unsuccessful.

On July 1, 2011, Krikorian's complaints to the OCE pertaining to Schmidt were elevated to full probation by the United States House of Representatives Ethics Committee. She was accused of accepting free legal services from Turkish-American interest groups pertaining to her lawsuits against Krikorian.

==== Case history ====
- The House of Representatives Ethics Committee ruled in early August 2011 that Schmidt had accepted funds and assistance from the Turkish Coalition of America for her lawsuits against Krikorian. As part of the House Ruling Schmidt was ordered to pay back over $500,000 in impermissible gifts to the Turkish Coalition of America a 501(c)(3) . Ethics complaints filed by Krikorian against Schmidt about illegal third party funding for the lawsuits resulted in his vindication.
- Schmidt's attorneys from 2008 to 2012 represented the Turkish Coalition of America (TCA), which paid the full $500,000 legal fees to these attorneys for legal costs and actions that benefited Schmidt.
- Prior to the HEC final decision in August 2011, Schmidt provided legal documentation that she was unaware the TCA group may possibly be affiliated with the Turkish government. Schmidt said she did not know TCA had paid her legal bills against Krikorian for almost 2 years, despite she or her Congressional staff meeting with and talking by telephone to these TCA attorneys on a regular basis about the lawsuits against Krikorian. Schmidt then claimed to the HEC that she could not be held legally responsible for the unknown actions of her TCA attorneys. The HEC declared that Schmidt is accountable for paying the full $500,000 in legal fees as an unpaid debt and she should return any and all TCA funds. However, the HEC agreed not to reprimand Schmidt for not knowing who had paid her $500,000 legal costs for almost 2 years and said her $6.8 million lawsuit against Krikorian should be decided by the Federal courts.

=== Olbermann and Yalamanchili ===
Krikorian allegedly made negative remarks about Surya Yalamanchili's name during the 2009 Congressional race, resulting in a rebuttal from Hamilton and Clermont County Democratic Chairmen Timothy M. Burke and David Lane, respectively. Subsequently, Keith Olbermann named Krikorian a "Worst Person in the World" on his MSNBC show, and Krikorian implied that since the show had run an Oil of Olay advertisement, Procter and Gamble were attempting to advance their former employee. Olbermann denied knowledge of what ads were being run on the show and stated that they had since checked the lineup and no Procter and Gamble ads had been run, although an online viewer informed him that Oil of Olay ads had been run prior to the online version of the episode.

== 2012 Congressional campaign ==
The Ohio Democratic Party and affiliates across southern Ohio began circulating literature for 2012 candidates as early as 2011.

Krikorian launched a third candidacy for United States Congress. On March 6, 2012, he narrowly lost the Democratic primary to relative unknown William Smith at the same time Schmidt lost the Republican primary to Brad Wenstrup.

Multiple robo-calls were made on behalf of candidate Smith through a super PAC called Victory Ohio. Krikorian believes this contributed to his loss in the 2012 primary.
