= Fred Dailey =

Fred L. Dailey (born 1946) is a former director of the Ohio Department of Agriculture, and was the Republican nominee for U.S. Congress in Ohio's 18th congressional district. He lost the November 2008 general election by a 40.21%-59.79% margin to Democratic incumbent Zack Space.

Fred Dailey was appointed director of the Ohio Department of Agriculture by Governor George Voinovich in 1991, and served in this position for 16 years, making him the longest serving Agriculture Director in Ohio history.

From 1975 to 1981, Dailey served as director of the Indiana Division of Agriculture, and from 1982 to 1991 he served as executive vice president of the Ohio Beef Council and executive secretary of the Ohio Cattlemen's Association. Dailey is a former president of the National Association of State Departments of Agriculture. In 2003 Dailey was appointed chairman of the Federal Agricultural Mortgage Corporation.

Dailey earned his B.A. degree in political science and history from Anderson University, and earned his master's degree in public administration from Ball State University, graduating Summa Cum Laude.

Fred Dailey served with the 101st Airborne Division in the Vietnam War. Dailey is also a former rodeo cowboy and a mountaineer.

== Political views ==
Dailey describes himself as "Pro-Family, Pro-Life, Pro-Second Amendment, Pro-Worker, Pro-Business, Pro-Family Farmer, Pro-Defense and Pro-America." He is opposed to the estate tax and supports making the Bush tax cuts permanent.

== See also ==
- United States House of Representatives elections in Ohio, 2008#District 18
