= Words taken down =

Words taken down is a parliamentary procedure in the United States House of Representatives by which one member requests that another member be sanctioned for remarks that violate decorum. Such remarks can include profanity or personal aspersions against a House member.

The Congressional Research Service summarized the process in the following way:

A Member may demand that the words of another Member be taken down. This typically takes place during debate when one Member believes another Member has violated the rules of decorum in the House. The request requires that the Member's remarks be read to the House so that the Speaker may determine whether they are offensive or otherwise violate the rules of the House. If the Speaker determines that the words are out of order, the violator is customarily given a chance to withdraw or amend them, and the Member may ask the House for unanimous consent to strike the words from the Congressional Record. If there is objection, a motion may be offered to strike the words from the debate. Upon the demand that the words be taken down, the alleged violator must immediately sit down and await the Speaker's decision. A Member whose words have been ruled out of order may not speak again on the same day without the House's permission, but the Member can vote. A Member would say: Mr. Speaker, I rise to a point of order, and ask that the gentleman's (or gentlelady's) words be taken down.

Martin L. Levine, law professor at the University of Southern California, notes that "Taking down words, like 'taking down names,' is the start and not the end of a process. A separate step is required to rule the words out of order."

A 1999 study by Kathleen Hall Jamieson found that requests to take down words peaked in 1946 and 1995, years before or after control of the House changed hands.

== Notable Uses ==
The procedure has been used many times in recent years, with several instances of the Speaker, or their designee, ruling words spoken in debate out of order. From 1971 through 2019 the procedure was used at least 170 times. Some uses have been particularly notable.

=== 1984 Speaker O'Neil ===
In floor debate on May 15, 1984, Speaker Tip O'Neil was speaking from the floor on a question of privilege brought by then Rep. Newt Gingrich relating to remarks by Speaker O'Neil the prior day. On May 15, Speaker O'Neil said of Rep. Gingrich:

"My personal opinion is this: you deliberately stood in that well before an empty House and challenged these people and you challenged their Americanism and it is the lowest thing that I have ever seen in my 32 years in Congress."

Rep. Trent Lott demanded those words be taken down. The Speaker Pro Tempore presiding at that time, Rep. Joe Moakley, ruled the words of Speaker O'Neil out of order saying "that type of characterization that should not be used in debate."
