= Joe Cimperman =

American Democratic politician

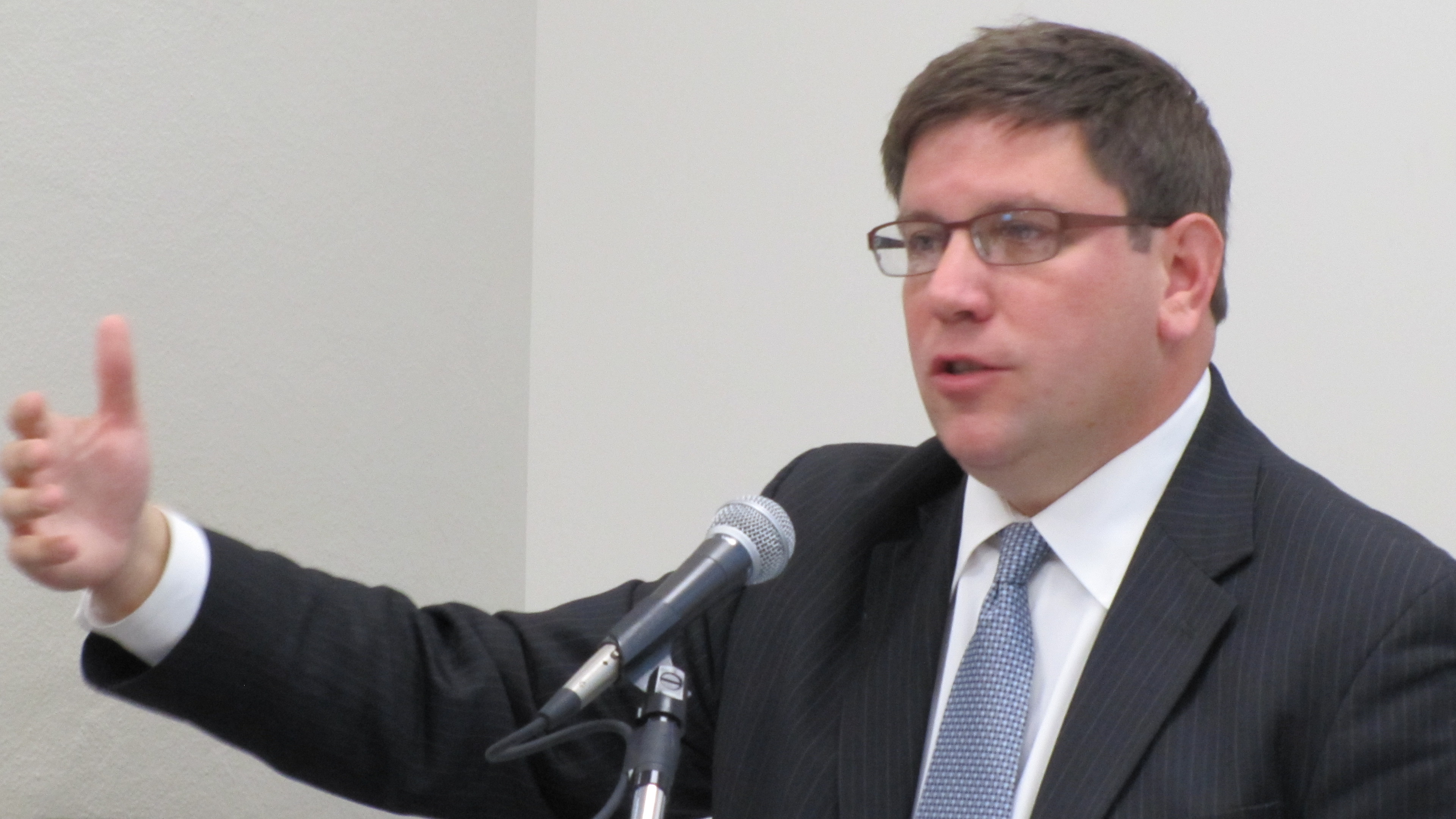
- Joe Cimperman in October 2011

Member of the Cleveland City Council from Ward 13
- In office 1997–2016
- Succeeded by: Kerry McCormack

Personal details
- Born: Cleveland, Ohio, U.S.
- Party: Democratic
- Education: John Carroll University

Joe Cimperman (born c. 1970) is a Slovenian-American politician who served as a member of the Cleveland City Council, representing near-west side neighborhoods from 1997 to 2016. A Democrat, he had previously been chairman of the Health and Human Services Committee and a member of the Community and Economic Development Committee, Legislation and Public Parks Committee and Property and Recreation Committee.

== Early life and education ==
Cimperman was born in Cleveland to a Slovenian family that was active in the city's Slovenian community located in the St. Clair-Superior neighborhood on Cleveland's east-side. He graduated in 1988 from St. Ignatius High School, a Jesuit college-prep school on Cleveland's near-west side. He attended John Carroll University, a Jesuit institution on the city's east side, where he served as the Student Union President during the 1991–1992 term. His senior year, the student body also voted Cimperman as the Beaudry Award winner, an award for Christian leadership, academic achievement, and contributions to the university. While at John Carroll University, Cimperman founded Project GOLD, an international award-winning service organization dedicated to helping underprivileged families. He graduated in 1992 with a Bachelor of Arts (BA) degree in English.

Cimperman considered a vocation as a Catholic priest. His sister is a nun in San Antonio, Texas.

== Early career ==
After graduating from John Carroll University in 1992, Cimperman continued to devote himself to low-income individuals by working with the "I Have a Dream Foundation," a program designed to provide opportunities to low-income children interested in pursuing higher education.

Cimperman contributed two years of service to the Jesuit Volunteer Corps, working with developmentally challenged adults in Portland, Maine and at the Don Miller AIDS Hospice in Baltimore, Maryland. Following the Jesuit Volunteer Corps, Cimperman returned to his hometown of Cleveland, Ohio to serve as an outreach worker at the Westside Catholic Center.

== Political career ==
Cimperman was first elected to City Council in 1997, representing the 13th Ward, which includes the areas of St. Clair-Superior, Midtown, Downtown, Tremont, Ohio City/Near West, and Duck Island neighborhoods of Cleveland. In 2001, Cimperman was unopposed in the general election. In 2005, he won reelection by a wide margin of 74%/26% over Laurel Warnke-Taylor. Cimperman ran unopposed in the 2009 general election.

Cimperman resigned from Cleveland City Council in January 2016 to become president of Global Cleveland, a Cleveland non-profit.

=== Urban agriculture and food policy ===
Cimperman was actively involved in the creation of an ordinance which created what was called the "Open Space & Recreation Zoning District". Adopted in 2005 and established as part of the zoning code, the ordinance gives the city the right to reserve lands for parks, recreation facilities and open space.

In 2007, Cleveland initiated the first urban agriculture zoning code, Urban Garden Zoning Districts, a concept that was largely created by Cimperman. Under the new code, the city has the ability to reserve land for garden use, permitting the sale of produce at farmers' markets. Public notice and public hearings are required to change the zoning to permit building on an urban garden site.

In 2009, Cimperman sponsored what became known as the "chicken-and-bees" legislation. Under this classification, most residents are allowed to keep up to six chickens, ducks or rabbits and two beehives in a backyard or on small vacant lots. Cimperman, an advocate against food insecurity, cited the growing trend of urban agriculture and the need for residents to be able to grow their own food. Residents wishing to keep such animals on their property must apply to the city's health department for a license. Cimperman also cited the need for this type of legislation to assist with the City's problem of vacant, blighted and abandoned housing stock.

Through an effort with the George Gund Foundation, the Downtown Cleveland Alliance and the Cleveland-Cuyahoga County Food Policy Coalition, Cimperman helped implement a program in which farmers' markets located in Cleveland can accept the social assistance Ohio Direction Card, allowing cardholders to buy from area farmers' markets and receive an extra five dollars.

=== Human rights ===
As a Councilman, Cimperman advocated for increasing the legal rights of the lesbian-gay-bisexual-transgender (LGBT) community.

In 2008, Cimperman introduced legislation for the creation of a domestic partner registry for gay and straight couples in the City of Cleveland.

Cimperman advocated for an anti-discrimination ordinance barring discrimination on the basis of gender identity and expression. Co-sponsoring the ordinance with several other councilmen, the City of Cleveland joined other major Ohio cities by passing legal protections for transgender persons.

In 2011, Cimperman sponsored an ordinance, that was passed by Cleveland City Council, that offers domestic partner benefits for city employees. However, it is limited to individuals in the domestic partner registry prior to a specific date. Other workers can have their partners added to benefits at an annual cost.

=== Community health and wellness ===
Cimperman, in collaboration with MetroHealth, the Sisters of Charity Hospital System, University Hospitals-Case Medical Center and the Cleveland Clinic, introduced a resolution known as "Healthy Cleveland", that aimed to make the city government a full partner in a collaborative effort by Greater Cleveland's four largest hospital systems to improve the health of city residents.

Cimperman advocates for food justice for low-income and minority residents, highlighting the significant health disparities between inner-city and suburban populations. He emphasizes the interconnection between food access and broader issues of social, economic, and racial justice.

== Congressional campaign ==
In December 2007, Cimperman entered the race for the Democratic nomination for Ohio's 10th Congressional District, which was represented by veteran politician Dennis Kucinich. Cimperman's aggressive campaign was one factor in Kucinich's decision to drop out of the Presidential election on January 25, 2008. A few days later financial disclosure reports revealed that Cimperman had nearly a 5 to 1 lead in campaign funds.

Cimperman's campaign tapped into the growing sentiment in Greater Cleveland that Dennis Kucinich's second consecutive long-shot bid for the Presidency was distracting the Congressman from focusing on issues such as the local economy. Cimperman highlighted the votes missed by Dennis Kucinich during his run for the Presidency, as well as the fact that the vast majority of funds raised by Kucinich came from outside the State of Ohio.

Cimperman, in a crowded field of five candidates, received 35% of the vote. Kucinich received 52% of the vote total, a far lower percentage of the vote than the Congressman received in previous Democratic primaries.

== Controversies ==
Cimperman has reported receiving threatening calls and email messages. In July 2008, a fire destroyed Cimperman's home in the Tremont neighborhood. It was investigated as "suspicious" and later ruled as arson. Less than a week later, the family's garage was broken into and his wife's car was vandalized. As of May 2009, no one has been charged for the arson.

In 2009, Ohio Ethics Commission reports revealed that Cimperman received more than 350 gifts in 2008, more than all of his fellow city council members combined. However, many of the gifts appeared to be related to the birth of his daughter and the fire in his home.

In 2015, the Ohio Ethics Commission announced an investigation of Joe Cimperman regarding city contracts that were awarded to his wife's employer, ParkWorks (later renamed LAND Studio).

In 2018, the commission found that Cimperman, as a city councilman, had, on 26 occasions, voted on or crafted legislation that awarded contracts to ParkWorks or LAND Studio. Ohio state law states that an elected official may not "Authorize, or employ the authority or influence of the public official's office to secure authorization of any public contract in which the public official, a member of the public official's family, or any of the public official's business associates has an interest".

Cimperman did not contest the charges and was sentenced to 1 year probation, a $10,000 fine and 100 hours of community service in May 2018.

== Personal life ==
Cimperman currently lives in the Ohio City Neighborhood with his wife and children.
