= Victoria Wells Wulsin =

American politician

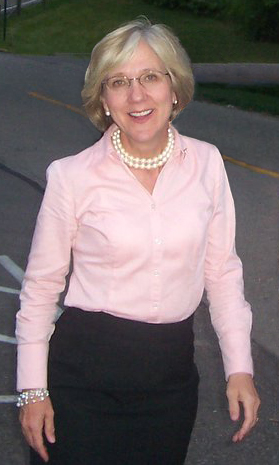
- Wells Wulsin in 2006
- Born: Victoria Elizabeth Wells; October 27, 1953 (age 72); Elyria, Ohio, U.S.
- Education: Harvard University (BA, MPH, PhD); Case Western Reserve University (MD)
- Political party: Democratic
- Spouse: Lawson Wulsin
- Children: 4

Victoria Elizabeth Wells Wulsin (born October 27, 1953) is an American physician and political candidate who specializes in epidemiology, and AIDS research among women in Africa. She has been involved in politics, and in 2006 and 2008 ran as the Democratic candidate for Ohio's 2nd congressional district, losing twice to Jean Schmidt.

== Early life and education ==
Wulsin was born in Elyria, Ohio, and is the daughter of a teacher and a social worker. She attended high school in Ohio, and earned a B.A. from Harvard University. After college, she returned to Ohio and earned a medical degree from Case Western Reserve University in Cleveland in 1980.

She earned a master's degree in Public Health (1982) and a doctorate in Epidemiology (1985), both from the Harvard University School of Public Health. Wulsin obtained medical licenses in Massachusetts (1981) and Ohio (1989).

== Career ==
From 1989 to 1995, Wulsin was the Director of Epidemiology in the City of Cincinnati's Health Department. She also worked in various capacities for the Centers for Disease Control and Prevention from 1986 to 2001.

In April 2003, Wulsin founded SOTENI International, a non-profit organization that focuses on fightingAIDS in Africa. It has its headquarters in Cincinnati and an office in Kenya. SOTENI assists those women and orphans who have been most affected by the AIDS pandemic. "Soteni" is a Swahili word which translates as "all of us". On January 26, 2011, during the award of a charter to the Mount Kenya University in Thika, Wulsin was installed as its first Chancellor.

=== Politics ===
Her interest in public health and larger social issues led her into politics, and she has run for office as a representative of her district to Congress three times, but has not been elected.

==== 2005 special election for Congress ====
Wulsin was a candidate for the Democratic nomination for Congress to replace Rob Portman in the Second District of Ohio in the special primary held June 14, 2005. In the Democratic primary, Wulsin finished second behind Paul Hackett. She received 3,800 votes (27.35%).

She had campaigned to reform health care to provide every citizen with coverage, promised to protect Social Security and the environment, said the Iraq War "has not been worth the cost of American service personnel or the dollars we have spent", and said America needed "fair trade" in the proposed CAFTA agreement. She also defended contraception, legal abortion and reproductive rights.

==== 2006 election for Congress ====
In 2006, Wulsin sought the Democratic nomination again. With Paul Hackett having announced he would not run again, she faced health care administrator James John Parker and civil engineer Jeff Sinnard, who both ran in 2005, and newcomers Gabrielle Downey, a high school teacher, and Thor Jacobs, a building contractor. Wulsin won the May 2 primary by nearly 15 percentage points and received the Democratic nomination for the 2nd District.

Facing the incumbent Rep. Jean Schmidt (R) in the November 2006 general election, she was defeated by a narrow margin: 2,517 votes out of almost 240,000 votes cast. This is the closest in 42 years that a Democrat has come to winning a full term in the historically Republican 2nd District. The last Democrat to win this district for a full term was future Governor Jack Gilligan, who held it for one term after being swept into office by the Democratic landslide of 1964.

Wulsin carried Pike and Scioto counties by wide margins and narrowly carried Brown County. She defeated Schmidt in the 2nd's share of Hamilton County, by far the largest portion of the district. Schmidt had won Hamilton County during her special election victory against Hackett. Schmidt carried her home Clermont County by over 8,000 votes, enabling her to keep the seat.

==== 2008 election for Congress ====
In the 2008 election cycle, Wulsin ran as the Democratic candidate for the Second District of Ohio after winning the primary. She defeated Cincinnati attorney Steve Black by 28 points in the March 4 primary.

In the general election, Wulsin faced two opponents, Republican incumbent Jean Schmidt and independent candidate David Krikorian. Polls showed the race to be close between Wulsin and Schmidt, with Krikorian attracting a significant amount of support for an independent candidate.

The three candidates engaged in three debates. The first took place at the Anderson Community Center on October 6, 2008, the second was aired on WCET on October 22, and the third was aired on Channel 12's Newsmakers program on October 26. All three debates focused mainly on the economy, the financial crisis, and local issues.

On November 4, the incumbent Representative Schmidt defeated Wulsin in the general election.

==== 2005 Malariotherapy controversy ====
During the 2006 and 2008 electoral campaigns, Wulsin's participation in a 2004 study for Cincinnati's Heimlich Institute was criticized by her opponents. Henry Heimlich had directed a three-year study in China, ending in 1996, that evaluated the use of malaria infection in fighting AIDS. In 2008 ABC News, in discussing Wulsin, noted that this theory had been debunked.

In 2004, Wulsin was hired as an epidemiologist by the Heimlich Institute to conduct a four-month literature review on "malariotherapy", the AIDS treatment based on infecting HIV+ patients with malaria. Wulsin wrote a draft report for the Heimlich Institute summarizing her findings, entitled "Immunotherapy and Beyond". It has not been published. She concluded that "the preponderance of evidence indicates that neither malaria or immunotherapy will cure HIV/AIDS." and recommended that the Institute wait for results of other studies. The day after Wulsin submitted the report, Heimlich fired her. Wulsin said: "I challenged the science and ethics of immunotherapy, malaria therapy. I didn't realize how much it was a challenge to his ethics and his science until he fired me."

The following year, Dr. Robert S. Baratz of the National Council Against Health Fraud filed a complaint with the State Medical Board of Ohio of Wulsin's work for the Heimlich Institute. After its review, the State Medical Board issued a letter on April 28, 2008, saying that "no further action was required by the board and the complaint has been closed."

That year the Republican candidate, Jean Schmidt, in a tight race with Wulsin, tried to capitalize on the controversy in a fundraising letter that incorrectly suggested that the doctor had been directly involved in experiments using malariotherapy. This was a distortion of her literature review study.

== Personal life ==
She married Lawson Wulsin, a psychiatrist at the faculty of the University of Cincinnati, in 1978. They have four sons. She is a resident of Indian Hill, a suburb of Cincinnati.

== See also ==
- Ohio's 2nd congressional district
