= Granny's Garden School =

Coordinates: 39°15′49″N 84°17′5″W

Loveland Learning Garden is a non-profit community school garden program located in the Loveland City School District in Loveland, Ohio. As "the largest and most comprehensive school gardening program in the Midwest," Loveland Learning Garden's collaborates with the Loveland City School District to offer hands-on learning experiences for students that are directly connected to state curriculum standards. Granny's Garden School has begun the Schoolyard Nature Network to aid those who wish to develop their own school garden programs. Hailed as a "tremendous community asset," Granny's Garden provides food for the school cafeteria as well as to the rest of the community. Granny's Garden School is featured prominently in Herbert W. Broda's book Moving the Classroom Outdoors: Schoolyard-Enhanced Learning in Action. Broda lauds the school as, "a truly amazing enterprise It has also been presented in the American magazine Birds and Blooms.

== History ==
Granny's Garden School is the brainchild of Roberta "Granny" Paolo, who was inspired by the positive experiences she had working with her own grandchildren in her backyard garden. One fall day in 2001, while picking her grandchildren up from school, she noticed someone planting flowers in the front of the school. It was then that she realized that school could be the perfect place for children to interact with gardens. After meeting with school administrators and the grounds manager, Paolo presented her idea for the school garden to the Loveland School Board.

The Loveland School Garden Program launched that spring. In addition to the adult volunteers, students contributed by spending some of their physical education hours in preparing beds and planting flowers. Over the course of the spring and summer, Paolo worked to create more garden activities and teachers would sign up to participate. By the fall of 2002 there were seventeen individual classroom gardens. Over the course of the next few years, Granny's Garden School continued to expand and develop comprehensive lesson plans and train instructors for the students. Today, there are over one hundred garden beds that serve over fifty classrooms at Loveland Elementary School.

== Mission and Goals ==
According to the Granny's Garden School website, the stated mission is:

Granny's Garden School develops and supports hands-on learning experiences for children through school-based, garden and nature focused programs to help children experience nature, the satisfaction of growing their own food and to appreciate the simple pleasure of picking a flower.

== Organization and staff ==
Granny's Garden School is run by several full-time employees and many more volunteers. In fact, twenty-five large scale projects at Granny's Garden School have been completed as Eagle Scout projects. Classes are run by a trained Granny's Garden School teacher in addition to the students' regular classroom teacher. Each class has about thirty elementary school students.

Granny's Garden School currently employs five class garden coordinators as well as an education director, garden manager, and executive director. Additionally, there are various volunteers in charge of special events, weekend activities, and the annual plant sale. On the weekends in spring and fall, volunteers from the community and local colleges help spread mulch, pick weeds, and plant flowers in the gardens.

== Curriculum ==
Granny's Garden School's curriculum is designed to be both engaging and practical and to align with state education standards. Activities cover a wide range of topics from math, such as measuring and recording data about plant growth, to biology, including learning how different organisms in the environment interact.

Granny's Garden School's curriculum contains lessons tailored to students ranging from preschool to fourth grade. Preschool students participate in introductory exercises such as learning about the cycle of the seasons and planting a flowering bulb in fall. Fourth grade students, on the other hand, complete more advanced activities such as weighing harvested potatoes to create and analyze a line plot of the results.

== Activities and special events ==
Granny's Garden School hosts a number of special events throughout the year.

=== Granny's Harvest Celebration ===
Held in fall, Granny's Harvest Celebration offers "Free old-fashioned family fun." This includes games, arts and crafts activities for kids, food, and an annual perennial exchange.

=== Spring Plant Sale ===
Held in May, the Spring Plant Sale allows citizens to purchase the surplus vegetables grown in the garden, in addition to annuals, perennials, and herbs.

=== Grandparent's Day ===
Held in fall, Grandparent's Day allows children to invite their grandparents to visit the garden and pick a bouquet of flowers.

=== Garden Educator Training Workshop ===
Granny's Garden School offers workshops to help people who wish to begin or strengthen their own community garden program. This includes information on how to plan for the next school year, how to use Granny's Garden School's lesson plans, and cooking demonstrations on how to use produce from the garden.
