= Branch Hill =

Branch Hill may refer to:

- Branch Hill, Hampstead, a street in London, England
- Branch Hill, Ohio, a community in Ohio, United States
