= Branch Hill, Ohio =

Unincorporated community in Ohio, U.S.

Coordinates: 39°14′44″N 84°17′35″W

Branch Hill is an unincorporated community in Miami Township, Clermont County, Ohio, United States, on the banks of the Little Miami River near Loveland. The Little Miami Scenic Trail passes through Branch Hill.

== History ==
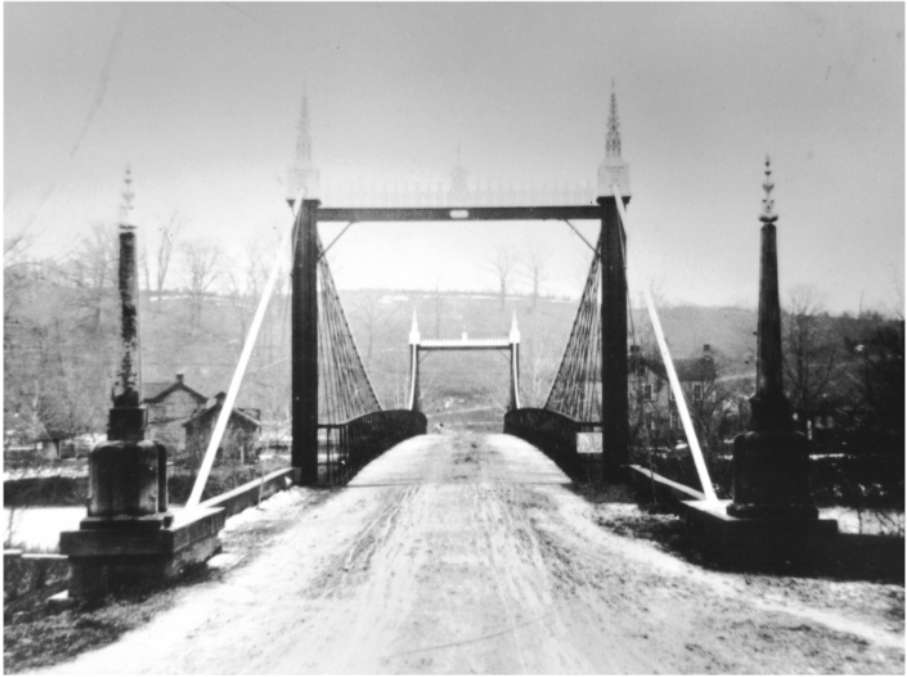
The 1872 Branch Hill Bridge spanned the Little Miami River just south of Loveland. It was replaced by the less ornate "Blue Bridge" in 1922.

Until wagon bridges were built across the Little Miami River, settlement of Loveland was mostly confined to the Clermont County side, which had access to a railroad station. A wooden bridge spanned the river at Symmestown and what would become Branch Hill from 1850 until it washed out six years later. For years, residents on both sides pushed for a bridge at Loveland, to avoid the long trip to Foster's Crossing or Miamiville, and by 1868 threatened to have Miami Township annexed to Hamilton County if Clermont County officials continued to obstruct the project. A $75,000 suspension bridge was finally built at Symmestown and Branch Hill and dedicated on July 4, 1871. It was anchored by four 7,000-pound (3,200 kg) wrought iron columns, at that time the heaviest ever made in the United States.

The community of Branch Hill was laid out in 1873 by Col. John H. Branch, and named for him.

During the 1930s, Branch Hill was home to the Arrowhead Club, a casino associated with the Cleveland Syndicate that served residents of Indian Hill.
