= Emma Montgomery McRae =

American professor of English literature

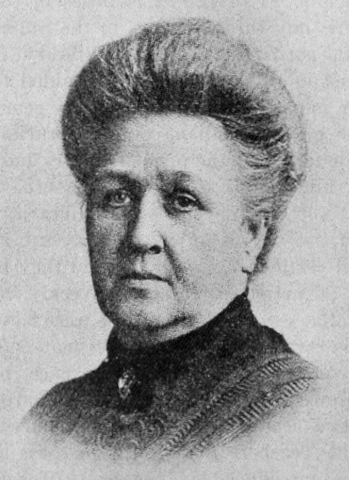
- Born: February 12, 1848; Loveland, Ohio, US
- Died: September 21, 1919 (aged 71); Newton Centre, Massachusetts, US
- Education: Master of Arts
- Alma mater: Brookfield Academy, Indiana; Wooster College, Ohio
- Occupation: Teacher
- Spouse: Hamilton S. McRae (m. 1868; died 1887)
- Children: Bertha (1873), Charlene (1876)
- Parent(s): William Montgomery and Anna née Newton

Emma Montgomery McRae (February 12, 1848 – September 21, 1919) was an American professor of English literature.

== Biography ==
Born Mary Emma Montgomery in Loveland, Ohio, she was the daughter of William Montgomery and Anna née Newton. Her family moved to Indiana when she was five. Emma completed her undergraduate work at Brookfield Academy, Indiana, then she taught at a school in Vevay, Indiana.

She became a high school principal in 1867 at Muncie, Indiana, and was married to Hamilton S. McRae on August 6, 1868, the local superintendent of public schools. She took the position of principal at Marion, Indiana in 1883. Emma was the first woman in Indiana to be chosen president of the State Teachers Association. Her husband died in 1887, leaving her with two daughters – Bertha born 1873 and Charlene born 1876.

In 1887, she was appointed professor at Purdue University by President James H. Smart. There, she served as the unofficial dean of women and acquired the nickname "Mother" from the undergraduates. In 1894 a group of women created the Muncie McRae club in her honor, which was intended to fill a void caused by lack of educational opportunity for women. She continued her studies at Wooster College, Ohio, earning a master's degree in 1896. In 1913, she was offered the official position of dean of women for Purdue University, which she accepted. She retired in June 1913, whereupon she was granted a retirement allowance by the Carnegie Foundation in July of the same year.

She died at her home in Newton Centre, Massachusetts on September 21, 1919.
