= Loveland High School (Ohio) =

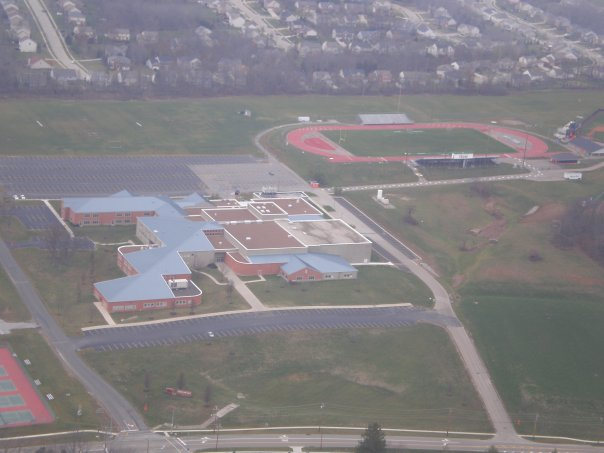
- Aerial photograph of Loveland High School

Location
- 1 Tiger Trail; Loveland, (Hamilton County), Ohio 45140; United States
- 39°16′46″N 84°16′29″W

Information
- School type: Public, Coeducational high school
- Established: c. 1881
- School district: Loveland City School District
- NCES District ID: 3904427
- Superintendent: Mike Broadwater (August 2021–present)
- CEEB code: 363-085
- NCES School ID: 390442701207
- Principal: Dave Spencer
- Teaching staff: 65.00 (FTE)
- Grades: 9-12
- Enrollment: 1,270 (2023–2024)
- Student to teacher ratio: 19.54
- Campus size: 69 acres
- Campus type: Suburban
- Colors: Orange and black
- Athletics conference: Eastern Cincinnati Conference
- Mascot: Tiger
- Team name: Tigers
- Accreditation: North Central Association of Colleges and Schools
- USNWR ranking: 46th State wide
- Newspaper: The Roar
- Yearbook: Lohian
- Website: lhs.lovelandschools.org

Loveland High School is a public high school located in Loveland, Ohio, United States, within Hamilton County. It is the only high school in the Loveland City School District, serving the communities of Loveland, Symmes Township, Goshen Township, and Miami Township. It offers a range of educational programs, including college preparatory and vocational.

== History ==
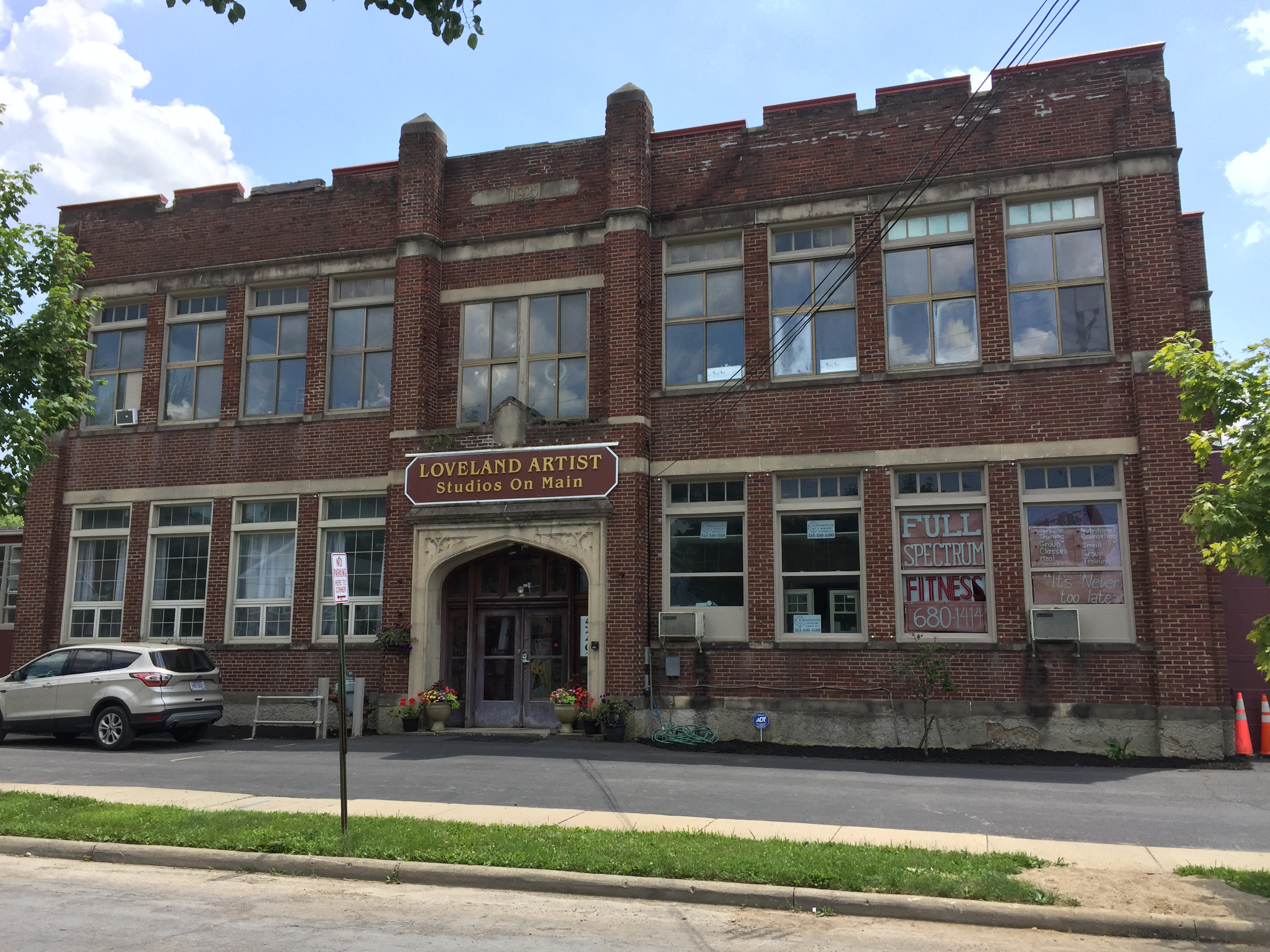
Loveland Artist Studios on Main, formerly West Loveland School.

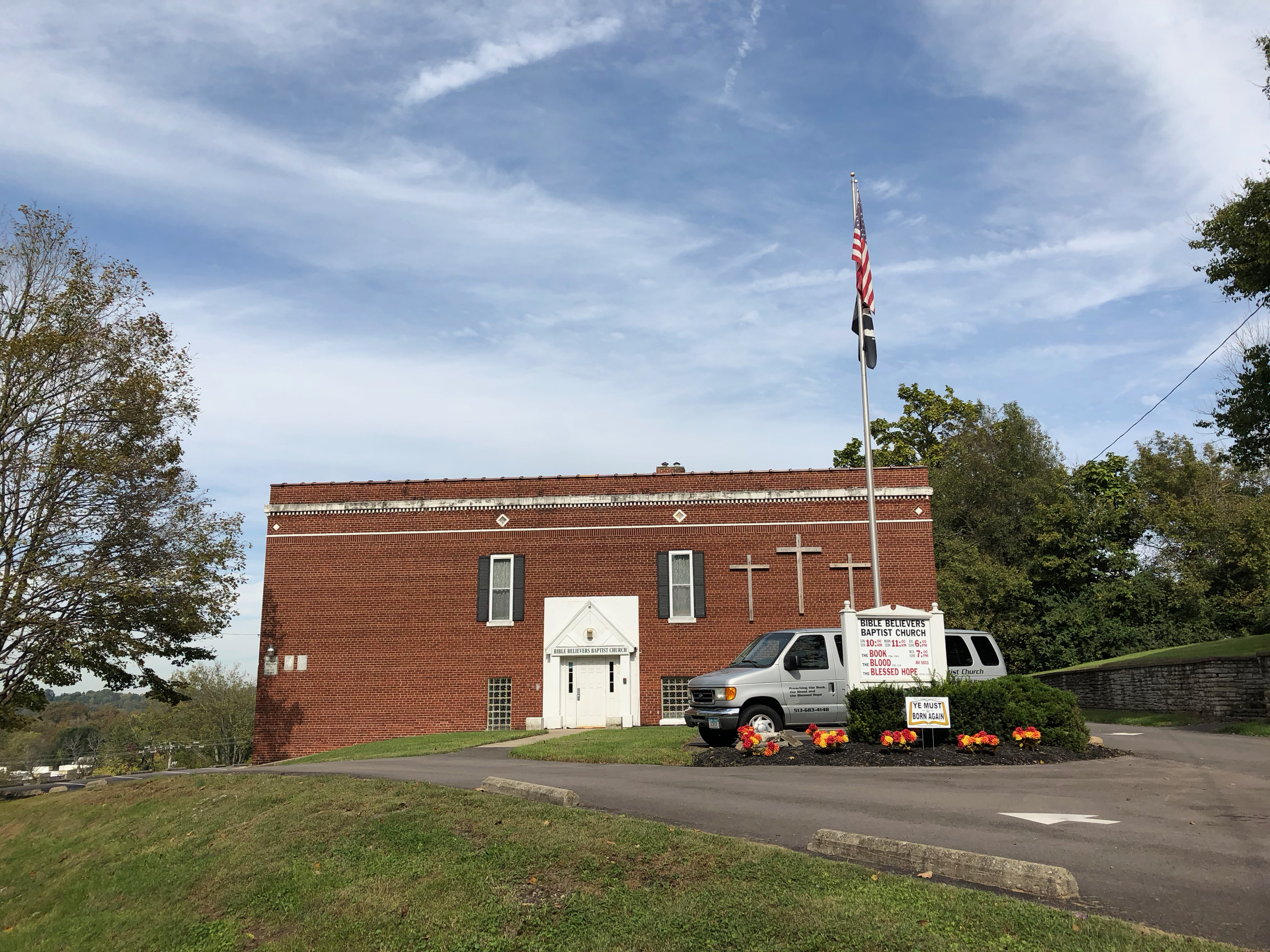
Bible Believers Baptist Church, formerly East Loveland School.

Until 1926, Loveland City Schools operated as separate Loveland East and Loveland West districts, and each district had its own high school. West Loveland School was located in present-day Loveland's central business district, in the building that now houses art studios. East Loveland School was built by Cincinnati architect Samuel Hannaford on Broadway Street and has since been converted into a church. Evelyn Hawley was the East Loveland School's first graduate, the only graduating member of the Class of 1881.

In 1940, a unified Loveland High School was built on the Hamilton County side of the city. In 1961, the high school moved to a new campus and the old building was repurposed as Loveland Junior High School (now Loveland Primary School). In 1970, the Loveland Board of Education officially renamed the newer campus to Lincoln W. Hurst High School in honor of the district's retiring superintendent. However, it came to be known as Loveland Hurst High School and was officially given that name in 1978. Ann Donahue, a Loveland High School graduate, modeled the set of the television show M.Y.O.B. after this building. It also featured in the made-for-TV movie The Pride of Jesse Hallam.

Loveland High School's current facilities were built in 1994 on the George Thurner estate to replace aging Hurst High School, which was converted into a middle school. Two years earlier, Loveland City Schools purchased land in Symmes Township, just outside Loveland city limits. The district signed a contract in which the City agreed to provide the new high school with water and sewage services; in return, the district would push for Hamilton County to annex the high school into Loveland at the city's request. In 2009, the Hamilton County Board of Commissioners allowed Loveland to annex the school.

In November 2012 Loveland staged a production of Legally Blonde, the 2007 Broadway stage musical, directed by Sonja Hanson a local dancer and choreographer. Despite prior approval of the script and open rehearsals the administrators objected to the play and told Ms. Hanson "You need to resign or you will be terminated."

== Extracurricular activities ==
LHS has two competitive show choirs, the mixed-gender "By Request" and the women's-only "Allure". By Request won the 2013 Show Choir Nationals competition. The program also hosts its own competition, the Showfest, every year.

== OHSAA State Championships ==
- Girls Soccer - 2017
- Boys Football - 2013

== Notable alumni ==
- Scott Benhase (1975) – Bishop of the Episcopal Diocese of Georgia
- Ann Donahue – television writer
- Adam Engel – Major League Baseball
- Matt Hamill – wrestler
- Ashley Palmer – actress
- Drew Plitt – XFL football quarterback
- Giovanni Ricci – NFL player
- Joshua I. Smith (1959) – businessman
- Luke Waddell (2017) – MLB shortstop

== Notable faculty ==
- Todd Benzinger (2006–2008) – girls' basketball coach; former Major League Baseball first baseman and outfielder
- Dan Ketchum (2009–2011) – swimming coach; gold medalist in swimming at the 2004 Summer Olympics
