= Anna McGarry =

American activist (1894–1978)

Anna M. McGarry
- Born: March 17, 1894; Philadelphia, Pennsylvania
- Died: January 2, 1978 (aged 83); Loveland, Ohio
- Occupations: Social Action Leader, Community Organizer

Anna M. McGarry (March 17, 1894 – January 2, 1978) was a leading U.S. advocate in interracial justice and veteran social action leader. Most of her work occurred in the city of Philadelphia, Pennsylvania, where she was a central figure in improving race relations. She was also a journalist for the Philadelphia Tribune.

== Early life ==
Anna McGarry was born on March 17, 1894, in Philadelphia to John and Sara McGinley. One of eight children, she attended parochial school in Philadelphia and two years of commercial high school. Early in her life, she held a bookkeeping position at National Label Company. In 1917, she wed Francis McGarry, who died in 1921, leaving her a widow.

== Social work ==
After her husband's death, she began to take an active role in repairing inhospitable race relations in Philadelphia. As a young widow, she was aghast by the social inequalities inherent in her own neighborhood. She dedicated her life to social justice, spreading word of the mounting problems during the 1930s by teaching. Beginning with World War II, she helped found and began working with the Philadelphia Catholic Interracial Council, becoming a staff member of the city's Commission on Human Relations and fighting for fair employment practices for African-Americans in that capacity. She was a critical figure in ameliorating conflicts such as the racial violence set off when, during World War II, African-Americans obtained jobs in the city's transit system, encountering hostile Irish transit union leaders.

She hosted a weekly radio program on interracial justice and wrote a weekly column on it in an African-American Philadelphia newspaper. A leading figure in the National Catholic Conference for Interracial Justice and the National Catholic Social Action Conference, she went on to press for equal access to educational, housing, and public facilities for all, regardless of race. After her formal retirement in 1959, she remained active in those organizations, and she continued to tour and give public speeches in an attempt to raise awareness of the social and economic barriers faced by African-Americans. While the Catholic Church condoned her message of social justice, she was seen as too radical and thus often had to pursue her endeavors without its assistance.

== Honors ==
McGarry received numerous accolades during her career, including honors from the New York Catholic Interracial Council, the National Conference of Christians and Jews, the Immaculata College Alumnae Philadelphia chapter, the Afro-American Newspaper, and the Philadelphia Puerto Rican Community.
