= Loveland City School District =

School district in Ohio

Loveland City Schools

Location
- Loveland, Ohio, United States

District information
- Type: City school district
- Superintendent: Mike Broadwater (August 2021–present)
- Asst. superintendent(s): Dr. Stace Puerta (Teaching & Learning); Garth Carlier (Human Resources)
- School board: Jonathan Eilert (Board President); Lynn Mangan (Board Vice President); Christina Jeranek; Dr. Eric Schwetschenau; Eileen Washburn

Students and staff
- Students: 4,200

Other information
- Website: lovelandschools.org

The Loveland City School District, known locally as Loveland City Schools, is a city school district that covers more than 15 square miles (39 km^{2}) in three counties — Clermont, Hamilton, and Warren — in the U.S. state of Ohio. The district encompasses the city of Loveland and reaches into Goshen, Hamilton, Miami, and Symmes Townships. Loveland Schools serves a population of 50,000 residents, including the city of Loveland. Fewer than 40% of students reside in the city proper. Loveland Schools' current student enrollment is 4,200 in six schools for the 2022-23 school year. Until May 2013, the district superintendent was Chad Hilliker. Dr. Amy Crouse succeeded Hilliker as superintendent of the school district starting May 1, 2017, until her resignation in December 2020 following a failed school funding levy. Mike Broadwater has served as superintendent since August 2021.

== Schools ==
East Loveland School in 1891 (top)

- Loveland Early Childhood Center (Kindergarten and first grade) 39°15′16″N 84°15′5″W
- Loveland Primary School (grades 1–2) 39°15′53″N 84°16′8″W
- Loveland Elementary School (grades 3–4) 39°15′49″N 84°16′13″W
- Loveland Intermediate School (grades 5–6) 39°15′46″N 84°17′6″W
- Loveland Middle School (grades 7–8) 39°15′48″N 84°17′5″W
- Loveland High School (grades 9–12) 39°16′46″N 84°16′29″W

== History ==
A one-room schoolhouse was built before 1847 at the White Pillars estate. A new, three-story schoolhouse was built at a cost of $20,000 and inaugurated on September 19, 1874. It was destroyed in a fire on April 14, 1887. In 1916, the Kansas School District merged with the West Loveland School District. Then in 1926, the East Loveland and West Loveland school districts merged. In 1956, Branch Hill School District merged with Loveland. When Loveland reincorporated as a city in 1961, Loveland Exempted Village School District became Loveland City School District.

== See also ==
- Granny's Garden School
