= Loveland Park, Ohio =

- Census-designated place
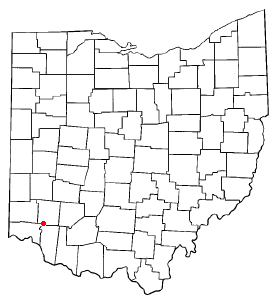
- Location of Loveland Park, Ohio
- Coordinates: 39°17′42″N 84°15′51″W
- Country: United States
- State: Ohio
- Counties: Warren, Hamilton

Area
  - Total: 1.33 sq mi (3.45 km^{2})
  - Land: 1.29 sq mi (3.35 km^{2})
  - Water: 0.042 sq mi (0.11 km^{2})
- Elevation: 728 ft (222 m)

Population (2020)
  - Total: 1,737
  - Density: 1,343.3/sq mi (518.66/km^{2})
- Time zone: UTC-5 (Eastern (EST))
  - Summer (DST): UTC-4 (EDT)
- FIPS code: 39-45122
- GNIS feature ID: 2393110

Loveland Park is a census-designated place (CDP) located in Symmes Township, Hamilton County and Deerfield Township, Warren County, in the southwestern part of the U.S. state of Ohio. The CDP is named after the city of Loveland. The population was 1,737 at the 2020 census.

== History ==
In the 1920s, The Cincinnati Enquirer ran a promotion that offered a free, 20-by-100-foot (6.1 m × 30.5 m) wooded lot along the Little Miami River after paying for a one-year subscription to the daily. The Loveland Castle was built on two such lots. In 1928, residents formed the nonprofit Loveland Park Association Inc. to serve as a homeowners' association.

== Geography ==
According to the United States Census Bureau, the CDP has a total area of 1.2 square miles (3.1 km^{2}), of which 1.2 square miles (3.0 km^{2}) is land and 0.04 square miles (0.1 km^{2}), or 4.34%, is water.

== Demographics ==
Historical population
Census	Pop.	Note	%±
2020	1,737		—
U.S. Decennial Census

=== 2020 census ===
As of the census of 2020, there were 1,737 people living in the CDP, for a population density of 1,343.39 people per square mile (518.66/km^{2}). There were 721 housing units. The racial makeup of the CDP was 88.3% White, 1.0% Black or African American, 0.2% Native American, 1.0% Asian, 0.1% Pacific Islander, 1.4% from some other race, and 8.1% from two or more races. 4.8% of the population were Hispanic or Latino of any race.

There were 711 households, out of which 34.2% had children under the age of 18 living with them, 72.4% were married couples living together, 8.9% had a male householder with no spouse present, and 13.4% had a female householder with no spouse present. 22.3% of all households were made up of individuals, and 5.2% were someone living alone who was 65 years of age or older. The average household size was 2.61, and the average family size was 3.07.

25.2% of the CDP's population were under the age of 18, 68.6% were 18 to 64, and 6.2% were 65 years of age or older. The median age was 42.5. For every 100 females, there were 82.9 males.

According to the U.S. Census American Community Survey, for the period 2016-2020 the estimated median annual income for a household in the CDP was $153,472, and the median income for a family was $172,831. About 0.2% of the population were living below the poverty line, including 0.0% of those under age 18 and 0.0% of those age 65 or over. About 71.3% of the population were employed, and 52.0% had a bachelor's degree or higher.

=== 2000 census ===
At the 2000 census there were 1,799 people, 658 households, and 513 families living in the CDP. The population density was 1,221.1 inhabitants per square mile (471.5/km^{2}). There were 687 housing units at an average density of 466.3 per square mile (180.0/km^{2}). The racial makeup of the CDP was 96.55% White, 0.89% African American, 0.28% Native American, 1.28% Asian, 0.50% from other races, and 0.50% from two or more races. Hispanic or Latino of any race were 0.78%.

Of the 658 households 36.9% had children under the age of 18 living with them, 67.2% were married couples living together, 7.8% had a female householder with no husband present, and 22.0% were non-families. 18.2% of households were one person and 7.3% were one person aged 65 or older. The average household size was 2.73 and the average family size was 3.11.

The age distribution was 26.1% under the age of 18, 5.9% from 18 to 24, 32.9% from 25 to 44, 22.8% from 45 to 64, and 12.3% 65 or older. The median age was 38 years. For every 100 females there were 101.7 males. For every 100 females age 18 and over, there were 98.8 males.

The median household income was $45,227 and the median family income was $50,536. Males had a median income of $39,148 versus $30,306 for females. The per capita income for the CDP was $24,546. About 1.3% of families and 1.8% of the population were below the poverty line, including 2.7% of those under age 18 and 4.3% of those age 65 or over.
