= Loveland, Ohio =

City in Ohio, United States

- City
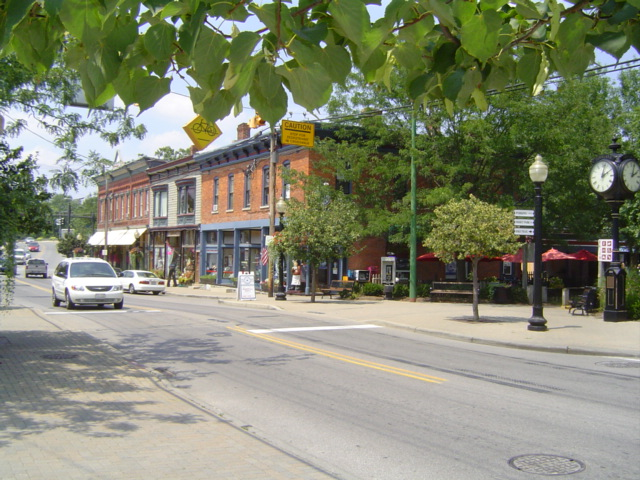
- Downtown Loveland at the Loveland Bike Trail crossing. Seen here is Loveland Avenue, originally named Jackson Street.

- Nickname: Sweetheart of Ohio
- Interactive map of Loveland, Ohio
- Location within Ohio Location within the United States
- Coordinates: 39°15′58″N 84°15′55″W
- Country: United States
- State: Ohio
- Counties: Hamilton, Clermont, Warren
- Settled: 1795
- Incorporated (village): May 16, 1876
- Chartered (city): July 25, 1961
- Withdrew from townships: 1975
- Founder: Col. Thomas Paxton
- Named for: James Loveland

Government
  - Type: Council–manager
  - Mayor: Kathy Bailey
  - Vice Mayor: Ted Phelps
  - City manager: Dave Kennedy

Area
  - Total: 5.07 sq mi (13.14 km^{2})
  - Land: 5.00 sq mi (12.94 km^{2})
  - Water: 0.077 sq mi (0.20 km^{2}) 1.40%
- Elevation: 705 ft (215 m)

Population (2020)
  - Total: 13,307
  - Estimate (2022): 13,131
  - Density: 2,663.0/sq mi (1,028.18/km^{2})
- Time zone: UTC-5 (EST)
  - Summer (DST): UTC-4 (EDT)
- ZIP codes: 45140, 45249
- Area code: 513
- FIPS code: 39-45108
- GNIS feature ID: 1085865
- LOCODE: US XHT
- Website: lovelandoh.gov

Loveland is a city in Hamilton, Clermont, and Warren counties in the southwestern part of the U.S. state of Ohio. The population was 13,307 at the 2020 census. Considered part of the Cincinnati metropolitan area, Loveland is located near exit 52 off Interstate 275, about 15 miles (24 km) northeast of the Cincinnati city limits. It borders Symmes, Miami and Hamilton townships and straddles the Little Miami River. Once a busy railroad town, Loveland is now a major stop along the Little Miami Scenic Trail.

== History ==
The city is named after James Loveland, who operated a general store and post office near the railroad tracks downtown. It was incorporated as a village on May 12 or 16, 1876, and incorporated as a chartered city in 1961.

=== Settlement ===
Present-day Loveland originally lay at the edges of the Symmes Purchase and Virginia Military District, in what was then the Northwest Territory. The area was first settled in 1795 by Col. Thomas Paxton:

The Kentucky landowners who were dissatisfied with their family land titles sold their holdings and bought land in the Miami valleys. Colonel Thomas Paxton who won his spurs in General Wayne's army and became enamoured with the Miami Country, sold his farm in Kentucky primarily because of a faulty title and bought 1,200 acres where Loveland now stands. He came here at the age of sixty and bought numerous tracts from Colonel Lytle, becoming a wealthy man before his death in 1813. The names of ten of his children who came to Ohio are associated with commodious residences, beautiful gardens and great orchards.

— William E. Smith, History of Southwestern Ohio: The Miami Valleys

Paxton named the settlement after himself; it was renamed Loveland in 1850.

=== Village getaway ===
In its early days, Loveland was known as a resort town, with its summer homes for the wealthy, earning it the nickname "Little Switzerland of the Miami Valley." Future Chief Justice Salmon P. Chase maintained a country home near Loveland, while the Cincinnati YWCA maintained a summer cottage there. The area was also home to Ohio's first paper mill, built in 1810 by John Smith. A local road retains the mill's eventual name, Kugler Mill. The area surrounding Loveland in Clermont County was well known for its peaches and strawberries. The Obionsville Post Office began operations on October 24, 1831, then changed its name to the Loveland Post Office on January 14, 1848.

The Hillsboro and Cincinnati Railroad was chartered in 1846 to run a line between Hillsboro and O'Bannon Creek in Loveland on the Little Miami Railroad's route. By 1850, the H&C had completed the 37 miles (60 km) to Hillsboro, Ohio. The H&C would lease its line in perpetuity to the Marietta and Cincinnati Railroad and ultimately became the mainline of the Baltimore and Ohio Railroad. Loveland's location at the junction of the Little Miami Railroad (now converted into the Loveland Bike Trail) and the Marietta and Cincinnati Railroad fueled the city's growth, bringing "40 passenger trains per day, and 12 scheduled freight trains between Loveland and Cincinnati."

Another railroad ran through antebellum Loveland: the Underground Railroad's Eastern Route from Cincinnati included a stop at the village and continued northward to Waynesville and Lebanon. During the Civil War, Confederate Brig. Gen. John Hunt Morgan and his troops passed through Loveland, seizing possessions of northern and southern sympathizers alike (see Morgan's Raid).

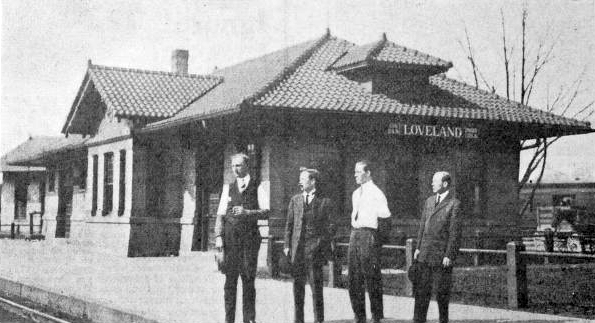
Railroad Station, circa 1914

Until wagon bridges were built across the Little Miami River, settlement of Loveland was mostly confined to the Clermont County side, which had access to a railroad station. A wooden bridge spanned the river at Symmestown and Branch Hill from 1850 until it washed out six years later. For years, residents on both sides pushed for a bridge at Loveland, to avoid the long trip to Foster's Crossing or Miamiville, and by 1868 threatened to have Miami Township annexed to Hamilton County if Clermont County officials continued to obstruct the project. A $75,000 suspension bridge was finally built at Symmestown and Branch Hill and dedicated on July 4, 1871. It was anchored by four 7,000-pound (3,200 kg) wrought iron columns, at that time the heaviest ever made in the United States. A second bridge, connecting East and West Loveland, was completed between 1872 and 1876.

Loveland incorporated as a village on May 16, 1876. John H. Law was elected the village's first mayor. That year, the Cincinnati Campground at Loveland was the site of the holiness movement's tenth annual National Camp Meeting.

In 1886, the skeleton of a mastodon and prehistoric stone tools were found in a Loveland gravel pit.

In 1903, Loveland voted to become a dry village, prohibiting the sale of alcohol within the village limits 17 years before a national ban. Loveland was a center of the Temperance movement in Ohio.

Downtown Loveland's proximity to the Little Miami River has made it vulnerable to flooding. The worst such event, the Ohio Flood of March 1913, destroyed a corn mill and washed out the Loveland Bridge, which was replaced with an iron bridge the next year.

In the 1920s, The Cincinnati Enquirer ran a promotion that offered a free plot of land in Loveland, along the Little Miami River, after paying for a one-year subscription to the daily. The Loveland Castle was built on multiple plots obtained through this promotion.

=== Growing city ===
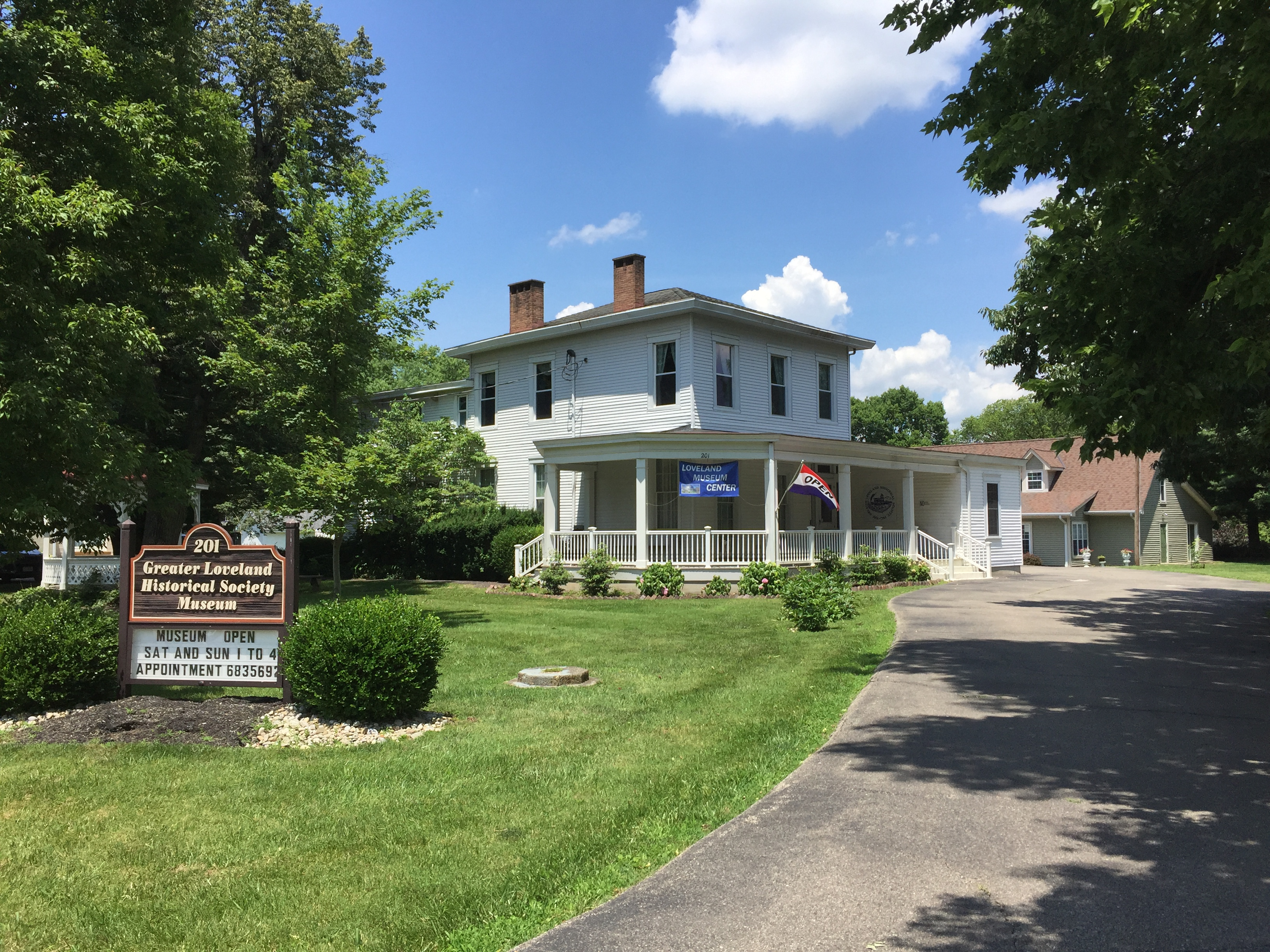
Loveland Historical Society Museum

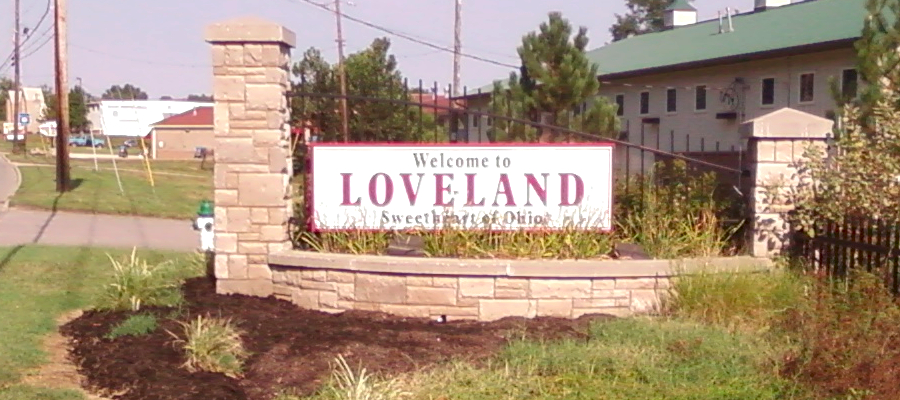
Loveland's main welcome sign until 2020

After a population spike during the 1950s, Loveland reincorporated as a chartered city – the first of only two in Clermont County – on July 25, 1961, with George Anderson as its first mayor. The city absorbed smaller settlements, such as Paxton, Obanionsville, and Symmestown. German architect Rudolf Fränkel developed a master plan for Loveland.

Another major flood in 1959 led to the construction of a dike along the Little Miami River in 1962–1963.

In 1969, Loveland elected Viola Phillips as mayor; she was the first woman to serve as a city official.

In 1972 and 1973, Loveland was the site of multiple Ku Klux Klan rallies that drew members from multiple states.

The long-abandoned Little Miami Railroad corridor was converted into a bike trail in the 1980s and became part of the Little Miami Scenic Trail in 1984.

Loveland has periodically sought to expand its borders by annexing surrounding areas, primarily to the more commercially active west. In 1993, the city attempted to annex parts of Deerfield Township, prompting petitions to instead merge the township with the City of Mason. Moves to merge Symmes Township with Loveland began the next year but ultimately failed. In 1996, Loveland moved its eastern border by purchasing Col. Paxton's original White Pillars homestead, which had remained unincorporated, despite being the first settlement in the Loveland area.

In the late 1990s, Loveland was designated a Tree City by the National Arbor Day Foundation, as it began a number of efforts to promote its Historic Downtown neighborhood, in part to celebrate the city's bicentennial. The programs included a renovation of Historic Downtown itself to sport a more "gentrified" look, for example replacing concrete sidewalks with brick ones, installing park benches throughout, and providing incentives to businesses willing to improve their façades. Major roads such as South Lebanon Road (County Road 298) were expanded and given landscaped medians.

The front lawn of Loveland City Hall was decorated with a nativity scene annually from 1973 until 1993, when a representative of the Ku Klux Klan asked the city for permission to erect a cross beside the display. Since then, the nativity scene has been placed on privately owned property.

The Loveland Beautification Committee was established to sponsor various programs and events that aim to improve landscapes and other buildings around town. Under the mayorship of Lee Skierkiewicz, Loveland heavily promoted itself as a cycling destination. The Tour de Loveland, an annual cycling race, was started in order to promote the Loveland Bike Trail as the centerpiece of Historic Downtown Loveland. The city's efforts culminated with USA Cycling Elite National Championship criteriums in June 1998. On January 24, 2005, Loveland City Council voted to cancel the Tour, due to declining attendance and a lack of sponsors.

On April 9, 1999, Loveland found itself in the path of an F4 tornado (see Fujita scale). The tornado claimed four fatalities, including a Loveland resident, before reaching the city.

With "four blooms", Loveland won the 2005 America in Bloom competition for cities with 10,001 to 15,000 residents. Loveland lost to St. Ives/Carbis Bay in the 2006 Communities in Bloom International Challenge, medium category, but won the "Communities in Bloom Youth Involvement Project Award."

In 2004, CSX Transportation leased the former Baltimore and Ohio railroad to RailAmerica's Indiana and Ohio Railway system. On May 4, 2007, Ohio's first four-quadrant gate was installed at the Second Street railroad crossing in Loveland, as part of a coordinated three-crossing system.

In 2013, Loveland was named a "Best Hometown" by Ohio Magazine.

Loveland went without a mayor from August to December 2017, after Mayor Mark Fitzgerald resigned under pressure from a recall effort and a move to replace him was declared invalid.

=== Zoning controversies ===
Loveland has seen several controversies over zoning regulation. After the city acquired the White Pillars property in 1996, it began plans to develop the land, which is situated on State Route 48. Prior to being elected councilman, Paul Elliot participated in a lawsuit against the city over attempting to rezone the property for commercial use without voter approval. In 2003, Mike Showler led a successful referendum to block the rezoning. An earlier attempt to develop a YMCA location on a section of Phillips Park also failed, when a group of residents protested the city's development plans, prompting the YMCA to abandon the location. In December 2006, Loveland announced a plan to build a Loveland Recreation Center on land adjacent to Phillips Park. The city planned to enter into an operating agreement with the YMCA once the center was built; however, the Recreation Center tax referendum was defeated in May 2007. The Recreation Center plan was later revised, but Loveland residents again rejected an income tax levy to fund the center on November 6, 2007.

Shooter's Supply, a local gun store, proposed building an indoor shooting range at the former location of the Matthew 25: Ministries humanitarian aid agency. Nearby residents attempted to block the shooting range, which would be built near several apartment complexes and residential neighborhoods, as well as a church. In May 2007, the building was instead converted into a luxury boarding facility for dogs.

== Geography ==
According to the United States Census Bureau, the city has a total area of 5.00 square miles (12.95 km^{2}), of which 4.93 square miles (12.77 km^{2}) is land and 0.07 square miles (0.18 km^{2}) is water. The city is situated at an elevation of 597 ft (182 m) above sea level.

Loveland can be reached by car most easily via Interstate 275, but State Route 48 also serves the city. State Route 3 / U.S. Route 22 touches the northwestern corner of Loveland, and State Route 126 passes through Remington and Miamiville to the south.

Loveland is located within three counties: Hamilton, Clermont and Warren. At least 61 Ohio cities cross county lines. Loveland has withdrawn from Symmes, Miami, and Hamilton Townships to form a coextensive set of paper townships each named Loveland Township. Historic Downtown Loveland and the central business district lie in a small valley on opposite sides of the Little Miami Scenic River, the boundary between Hamilton and Clermont counties, whereas most of Loveland's residential areas are located on the hills surrounding the valley on either side. Loveland City Hall is located in Clermont County, whereas most of the population resides in Hamilton County.

These areas include some neighborhoods from the 1950s and earlier, as well as a number of newer subdivisions built as part of the urban sprawl that saw nearby Mason grow tremendously. Unlike Mason and other suburbs closer to Interstate 71 and Interstate 75, Loveland is considered somewhat of a "bedroom community", where residential neighborhoods (and churches) seemingly outnumber businesses, and many residents make the half-hour commute to Downtown Cincinnati for work each day.

The 513 area code includes the entirety of Loveland. The 45140 ZIP Code also includes the entire city, with the exception of a few recently annexed businesses that belong to the 45249 ZIP Code (Symmes). The United States Postal Service lists a number of place names as unacceptable for this ZIP Code, including "Murdock" and "Twenty Mile Stand"; however, "Loveland, Ohio" is acceptable for Camp Dennison's 45111 ZIP Code. The 45108 FIPS55 code and US XHT LOCODE both correspond to the city proper.

== Demographics ==
Historical population
Census	Pop.	Note	%±
1880	595		—
1890	1,153		93.8%
1900	1,260		9.3%
1910	1,421		12.8%
1920	1,557		9.6%
1930	1,954		25.5%
1940	1,904		−2.6%
1950	2,149		12.9%
1960	5,008		133.0%
1970	7,126		42.3%
1980	9,106		27.8%
1990	9,990		9.7%
2000	11,677		16.9%
2010	12,081		3.5%
2020	13,307		10.1%
2025 (est.)	13,288		−0.1%

In 1880, when the first census was taken of Loveland in Clermont County, the village had 595 residents, while the unincorporated Hamilton County community of West Loveland had 197. In 1890, Loveland grew to 761 residents in Clermont and Warren counties, while West Loveland's population increased to 392.

=== 2020 census ===
As of the 2020 census, Loveland had a population of 13,307, for a population density of 2,663.00 people per square mile (1,028.19 people/km^{2}). There were 5,561 housing units, of which 4.9% were vacant; the homeowner vacancy rate was 0.8% and the rental vacancy rate was 8.7%.

There were 5,291 households in Loveland, of which 33.6% had children under the age of 18 living in them. Of all households, 51.4% were married-couple households, 15.1% were households with a male householder and no spouse or partner present, and 28.1% were households with a female householder and no spouse or partner present. About 27.3% of all households were made up of individuals, and 12.8% had someone living alone who was 65 years of age or older. The average household size was 2.54, and the average family size was 3.07.

The median age was 40.0 years. 24.4% of residents were under the age of 18 and 17.4% of residents were 65 years of age or older. For every 100 females there were 92.7 males, and for every 100 females age 18 and over there were 87.8 males age 18 and over.

Of residents, 99.9% lived in urban areas, while 0.1% lived in rural areas.

Racial composition as of the 2020 census
Race	Number	Percentage
White	11,790	88.6%
Black or African American	290	2.2%
American Indian and Alaska Native	12	0.1%
Asian	300	2.3%
Native Hawaiian and Other Pacific Islander	10	0.1%
Some other race	151	1.1%
Two or more races	754	5.7%
Hispanic or Latino (of any race)	444	3.3%

According to the U.S. Census American Community Survey, for the period 2016-2020 the estimated median annual income for a household in the city was $75,610, and the median income for a family was $89,899. About 7.7% of the population were living below the poverty line, including 7.1% of those under age 18 and 11.6% of those age 65 or over. About 65.3% of the population were employed, and 44.8% had a bachelor's degree or higher.

=== 2010 census ===
As of the census of 2010, there were 12,081 people, 4,701 households, and 3,270 families residing in the city. The population density was 2,450.5 inhabitants per square mile (946.1/km^{2}). There were 4,961 housing units at an average density of 1,006.3 units per square mile (388.5 units/km^{2}). The racial makeup of the city was 93.5% White, 2.1% African American, 0.1% Native American, 1.7% Asian (of whom 36% were Asian Indian and 20% were Chinese), 0.1% Pacific Islander, 0.6% from other races, and 1.9% from two or more races. Hispanic or Latino of any race were 2.4% of the population, of whom 53% were of Mexican descent.

There were 4,701 households, of which 38.3% had children under the age of 18 living with them, 52.5% were married couples living together, 13.4% had a female householder with no husband present, 3.7% had a male householder with no wife present, and 30.4% were non-families. 26.3% of all households were made up of individuals, and 11.7% had someone living alone who was 65 years of age or older. The average household size was 2.55 and the average family size was 3.09.

The median age in the city was 38 years. 27.9% of residents were under the age of 18; 6.7% were between the ages of 18 and 24; 25.6% were from 25 to 44; 27.2% were from 45 to 64; and 12.8% were 65 years of age or older. The gender makeup of the city was 47.9% male and 52.1% female.

The median income for a household in the city was $68,801, and the median income for a family was $89,199. Males had median earnings of $70,262 versus $44,652 for females. The per capita income for the city was $32,024, while the unemployment rate was 5.4% for those age 16 or older. About 8.0% of families and 8.4% of the population were below the poverty line, including 11.2% of those under age 18 and 10.4% of those age 65 or over. According to 2002 data from the Internal Revenue Service, Loveland residents gave 2.60% of their net income to charity.

== Economy ==
Tourism associated with the Loveland Bike Trail forms a significant part of downtown Loveland's economy. There is light industry at the Loveland Commerce Park in the northwestern corner of the city. Companies headquartered in Loveland include Dos Madres Press and Rozzi Fireworks.

From 1986 to 1998, the Baldwin Piano & Organ Company was headquartered in Loveland. Martinizing Dry Cleaning, Totes Isotoner, Pro Mach, and Blue Chip Cookies were also formerly headquartered in Loveland.

== Arts and culture ==
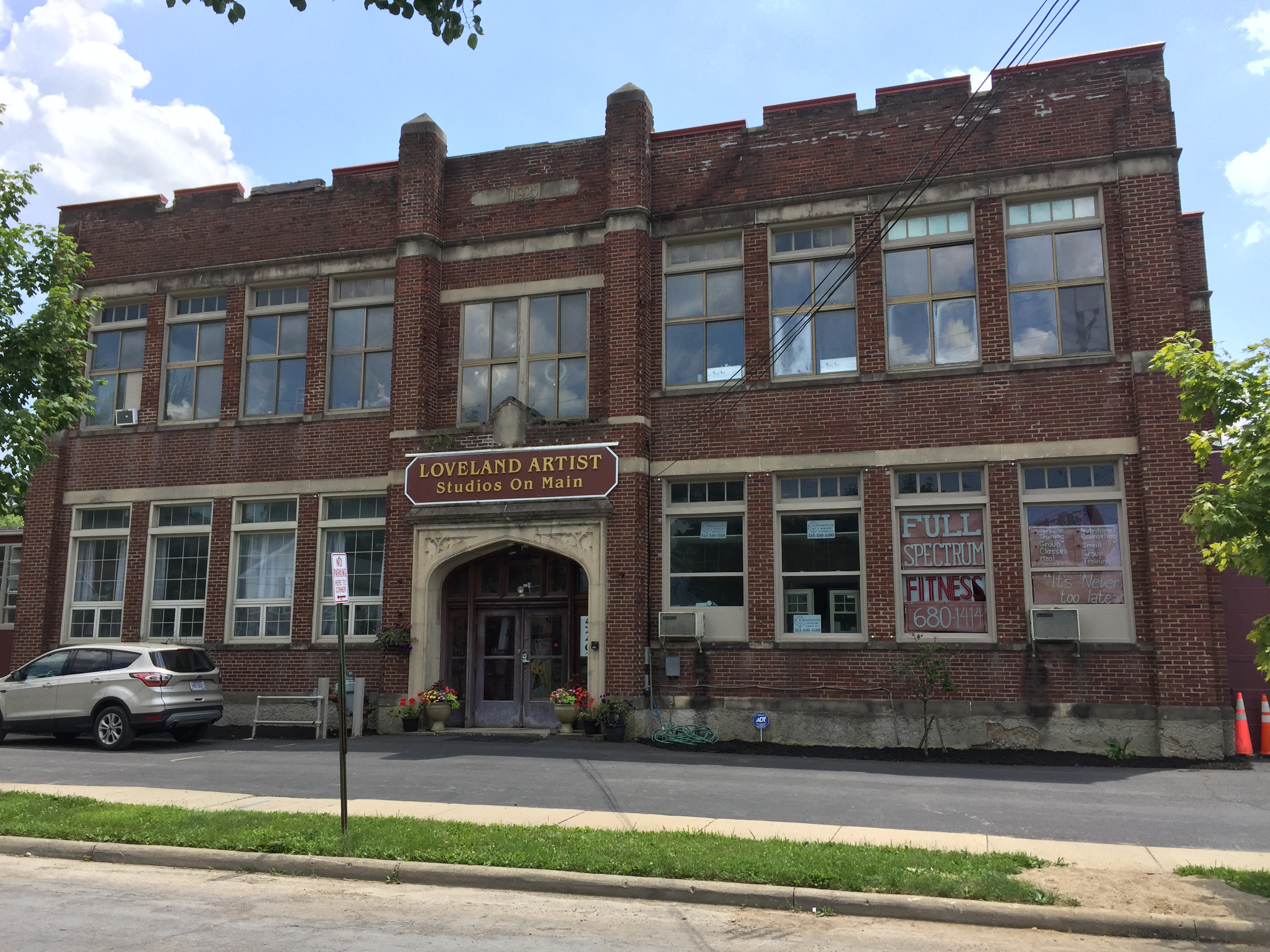
Loveland Artist Studios

Although the city's unusual name came from the last name of the village storeowner and postmaster, rather than the concept, Loveland has incorporated a "love" theme throughout the city. Loveland water towers and park signs sport the city's logo: a red heart inscribed with a sun, clouds, and the Little Miami River, and surrounded with the city's nickname, "Sweetheart of Ohio." The Loveland Post Office was the site of the United States Postal Service's issuance of a 29¢ commemorative "Love Sunrise" stamp on January 27, 1994, the first self-adhesive Love stamp. Each year since 1972, the Loveland Area Chamber of Commerce has run a special Valentine's Day program, which includes a poetry contest and the selection of a volunteer "Valentine Lady". The Valentine Lady helps stamp up to 20,000 envelopes by hand with a Valentine-themed cachet and cancellation that reads "There is nothing in this world so sweet as Love." The first Valentine Lady was Doris Pfiester. Loveland has held a greeting card design contest annually since 1989. As of 1992, Valentine's Day is the only day of the year when non-residents may reserve Loveland City Hall for marriage ceremonies, other than for senior citizens.

The city's mascot is the Loveland frog, a legendary humanoid frog from the area.

The Grail's national headquarters and retreat center, known as Grailville, has been located just outside Loveland since 1944.

The soul, funk, and retro-soul record label Colemine Records is based in Loveland and shares a building with its associated record store, Plaid Room Records. Colemine was founded in 2007 and has released records by artists such as Durand Jones & The Indications, Black Pumas, Delvon Lamarr Organ Trio, and Ikebe Shakedown.

== Parks and recreation ==
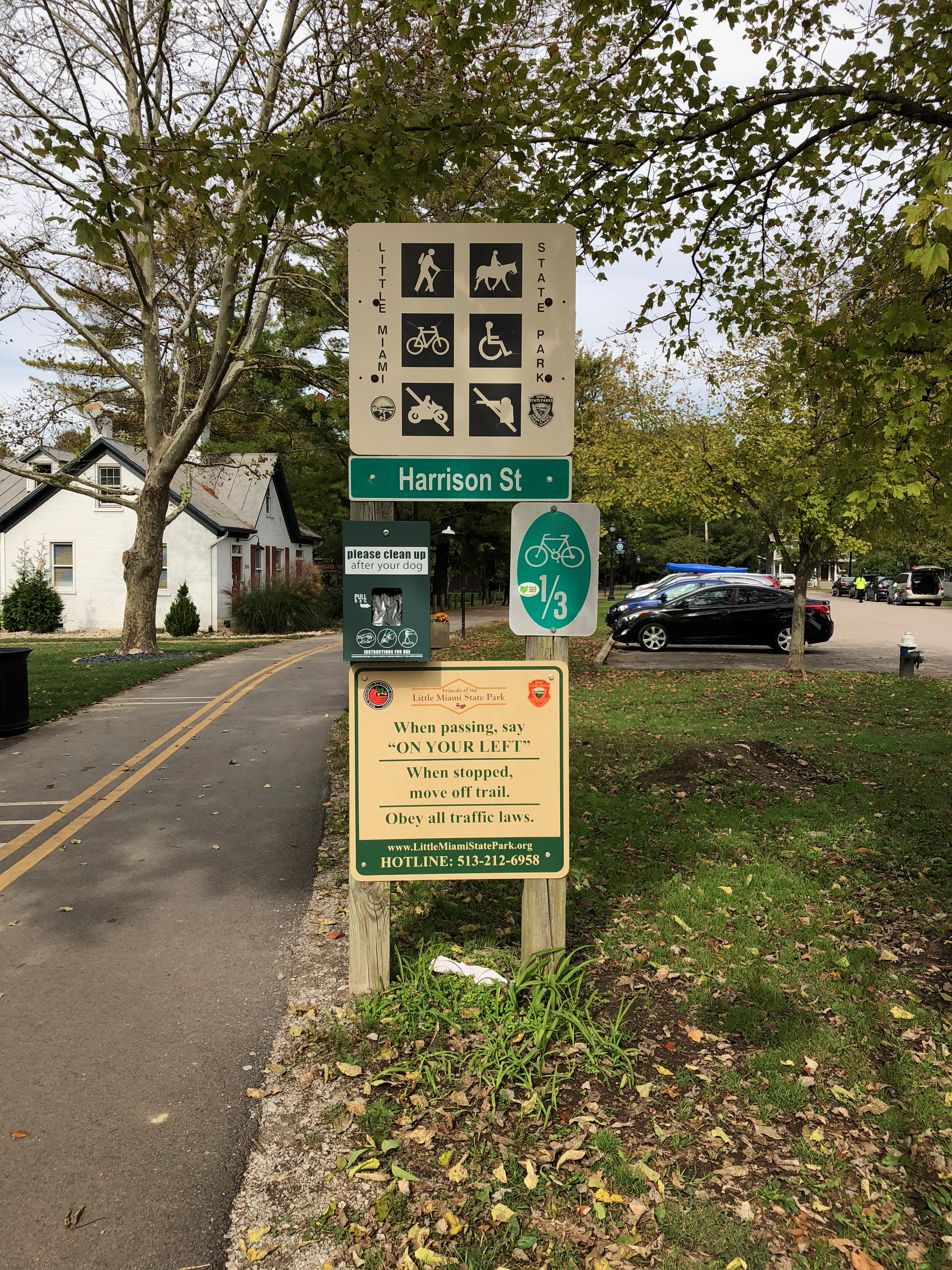
Loveland Bike Trail

Biking along the Loveland Bike Trail and canoeing along the Little Miami River are popular activities during the summer. Loveland has a series of 16 city parks, including neighborhood "tot lots", Nisbet Park, a Veteran's Memorial, and Fireman's Memorial. The parks are maintained by the City of Loveland Recreation Commission. The Loveland Bike Trail is a popular segment of the Little Miami Scenic Trail, a state park that runs through the city. From spring to fall, people canoe down the Little Miami River, departing from the livery at Loveland Canoe & Kayak.

Shield's Crossing is located in Loveland. The Gothic-style building, also known as the William Johnston House, is listed on the National Register of Historic Places.

Chateau Laroche, a historical museum and folly also known as the Loveland Castle, is located just outside of the city in Loveland Park.

Loveland's indoor attractions include Castle Skateland, a roller skating rink not to be confused with the museum; and the Loveland Stage Company, a theatre group that started in 1979 and has performed at least two major productions each year since 1980. In October 2002, after several years of fundraising and renovations, the group moved into Crist Theater, an old movie theater donated by the Loveland–Symmes Fire Department, which is stationed next door. The building had to be rebuilt after a fire gutted it on October 20, 2008.

== Government ==
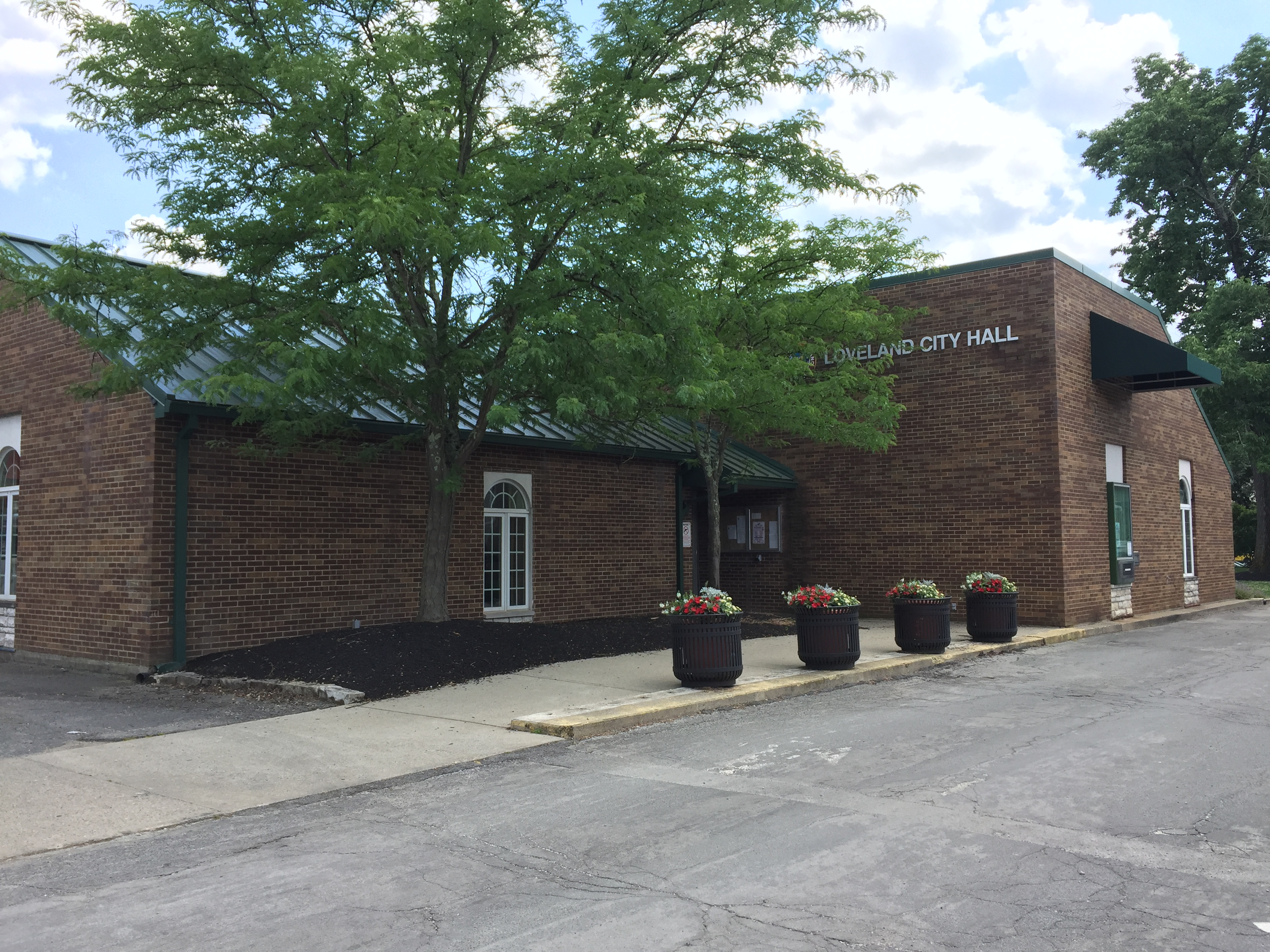
The rear of Loveland City Hall

Loveland uses a council–manager form of government. The Loveland City Council has seven at-large seats, elected to four-year terms in non-partisan elections held every two years. As of 2025, they are held by councilmembers Kathy Bailey, John Hart, Andrew Bateman, Brian Goodyear, Sherry Hamlin, Deidre Hazelbaker and Adam Jeranek. Dave Kennedy is City Manager. Traffic cases and other misdemeanors are heard in Loveland Mayor's Court, which is presided over by a magistrate.

At the federal level, Loveland is located within Ohio's 2nd congressional district. At the state level, it is also served by the 27th, 62nd, and 65th House districts; the 7th and 14th Senate districts; and the 1st and 12th appellate court districts. See Ohio House of Representatives and Ohio Senate for the current representatives of the respective state districts.

== Education ==
The city's public school district, Loveland City School District, operated as separate Loveland East and Loveland West districts until 1926. Until 2009, Loveland High School was located in Symmes Township, just outside the city limits. The northern- and southernmost parts of Loveland are served by Sycamore Community School District. Surrounding communities lie within the boundaries of Kings Local School District (see Kings High School), Milford Exempted Village School District (Milford High School), and Little Miami Local School District (Little Miami High School). The city is also served by the Great Oaks Institute of Technology and Career Development and a regional vocational school district. There are many private schools located near Loveland, including Cincinnati Hills Christian Academy, Archbishop Moeller High School, and Ursuline Academy at the secondary level, and St. Margaret of York School, St. Columban School, and Children's Meeting House Montessori School at the elementary level. At the 2000 census, 24.6% of Loveland children attended private or parochial schools, the nineteenth-highest rate among Greater Cincinnati communities.

The Public Library of Cincinnati and Hamilton County maintains a branch library in downtown Loveland, as well as a larger regional branch library in Symmes Township. The nearest branch of the Clermont County Public Library is in Milford. Warren County has no county-wide public library system, but the Mason Public Library is the nearest public library in the county.

== Media ==
Loveland lies within the Cincinnati media market. Some Dayton-area media is also available. Cable television is provided by Spectrum. Cincinnati Bell provides IPTV service under the FiOptics brand.

The Loveland Daily is a news website and podcast network that launched in January 2026.

Loveland Magazine is an online newspaper.

The Cincinnati Enquirer once published The Loveland Herald, a weekly newspaper, but the newspaper ceased publication in early 2019. The Herald began as The Tri-County Press in 1901 and took its present name in 1917. The Herald editorial offices were located in Miami Township until 2015 and then located to the Enquirer headquarters in downtown Cincinnati.

Defunct newspapers include The Loveland Herald (1901–2019), The Loveland Weekly Herald (1877–?), The Loveland Enterprise (1884–?), The Hustler (1906–1911), The Loveland News World (1980s), and The Loveland Record.

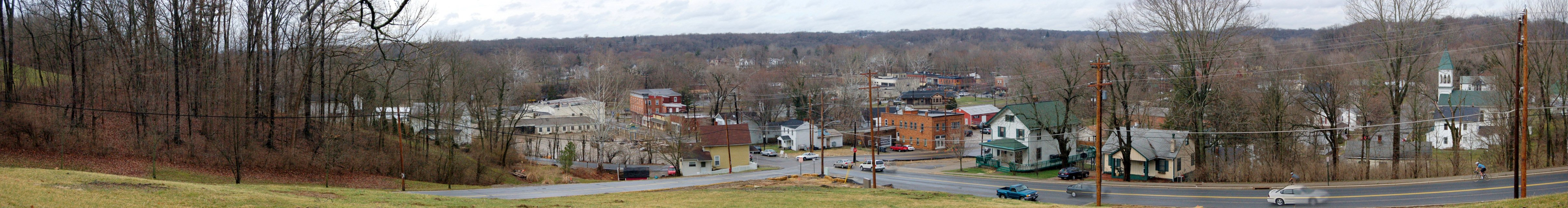
Downtown Loveland

== Infrastructure ==
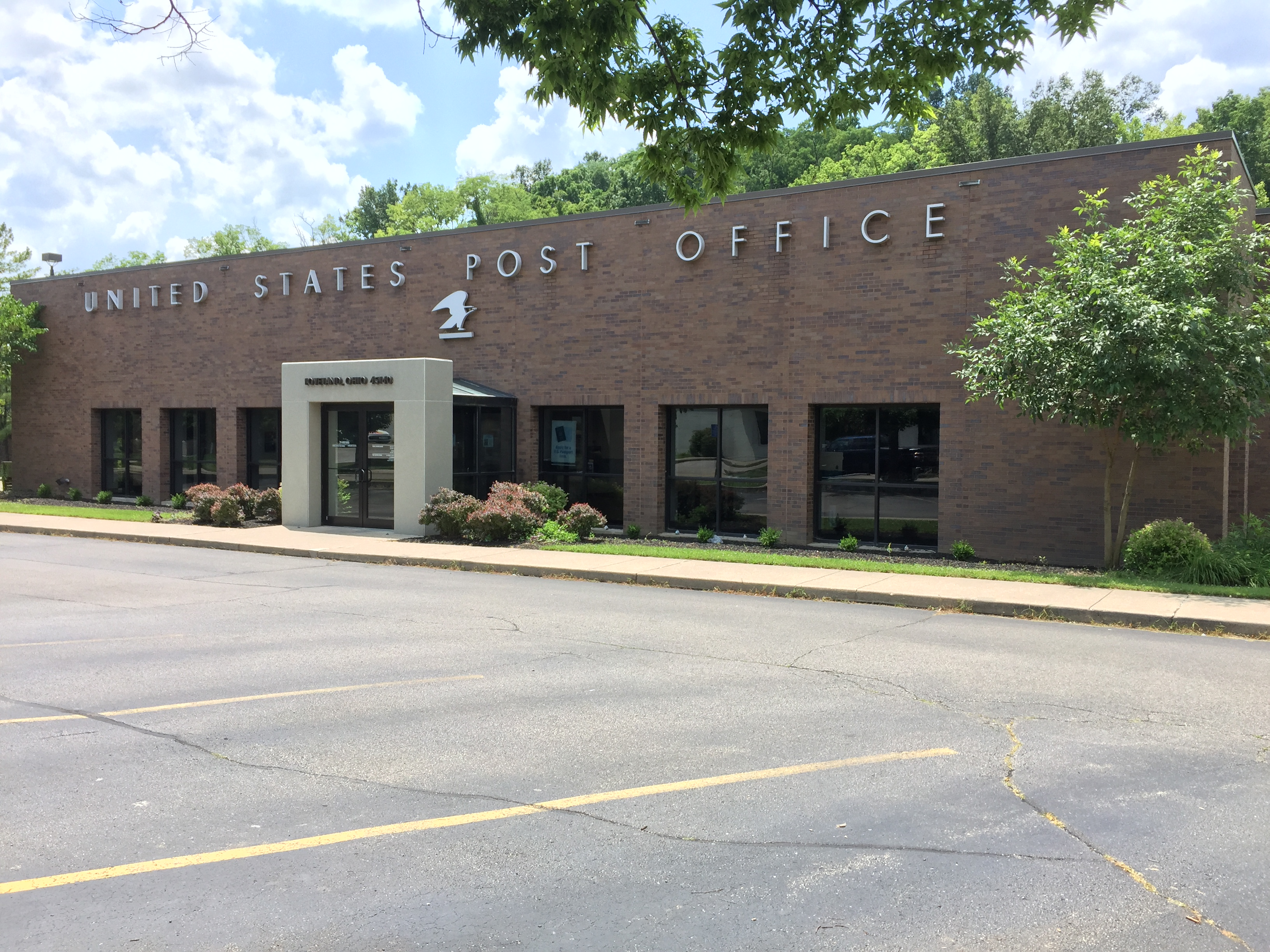
Loveland Post Office

=== Law enforcement ===
Loveland is protected by the Loveland Police Division and the Loveland–Symmes Fire Department, a member of the Northeast Fire Collaborative. Dispatching for both is handled by Northeast Communications Center (NECC), which provides Wireless Enhanced 911 service and also activates the local network of tornado sirens.

=== Services ===
The city lies in the Little Miami telephone exchange, within Cincinnati Bell's ILEC coverage area. Loveland receives electric and natural gas services from Duke Energy Ohio, formerly Cincinnati Gas & Electric. Waste disposal and recycling services are provided by Rumpke through the Southwest Ohio Regional Refuse (SWORRE) consortium. Loveland has water interconnectivity agreements with the City of Cincinnati and Clermont County. Loveland's Polk Run Wastewater Treatment Plant is part of Hamilton County's Greater Cincinnati Metropolitan Sewer District (MSD) under a 1985 operating agreement. The city sought to end the agreement in 2008, due to district-wide rate increases, but was barred from leaving MSD by a court ruling affirmed by the U.S. 6th Circuit Appeals Court.

== Notable people ==
=== Arts and entertainment ===
- Wilbur G. Adam, painter and illustrator
- Wendy Barrie-Wilson, Broadway actress
- Nancy Ford Cones, photographer, featured on Woman's Home Companion and Country Life in America
- Ann Donahue, television writer
- Vanessa German, sculptor, painter, writer, activist, performer, and poet
- Emma Montgomery McRae, professor of English literature
- Lillian Morris, Survivor: Pearl Islands contestant
- Ashley Palmer, actress and singer
- William Schickel, spiritual artist and architect who redesigned the Abbey of Our Lady of Gethsemani
- Jerry Springer, former mayor of Cincinnati, television host
- Madison Young, adult film performer

=== Athletics ===
- Todd Benzinger, former Major League Baseball first baseman and outfielder
- Don Biggs, Canadian retired professional ice hockey player
- Tyler Biggs, ice hockey player, Orlando Solar Bears
- Steve Brown, darts player
- Adam Engel, professional baseball outfielder, Chicago White Sox
- Matt Hamill, mixed martial arts fighter and three-time NCAA Wrestling Division III national champion
- Joe Kelly, professional football linebacker
- Dan Ketchum, gold medalist in swimming at the 2004 Summer Olympics
- Tacks Latimer, professional baseball catcher and convicted murderer
- Henry W. Lever, head football coach, Texas Christian University
- Bob Lohr, professional golfer
- Jack Pfiester, professional baseball player
- Drew Plitt, professional football quarterback in the XFL
- Herb Royer, college football coach
- Mike Sylvester, professional basketball player, silver medalist for Italy in 1980 Summer Olympics

=== Business ===
- Joshua I. Smith, founder of Maxima Corporation; chair of the United States Commission on Minority Business Development

=== Military ===
- James Hall, Army captain, editor of Western Monthly Magazine, lawyer, and jurist

=== Politics and law ===
- Gary Abernathy, newspaper editor, Republican Party official, and political commentator
- Salmon P. Chase, Chief Justice of the United States
- William Johnston, Surveyor General of the Northwest Territory, superior court judge, and Whig gubernatorial nominee
- Lindiwe Mabuza, formerly South African ambassador to Germany and High Commissioner to the UK
- Anna McGarry, social activist on interracial justice and community organizer
- Bill Schickel, Iowa State Representative
- Joe Uecker, Republican member of the Ohio House of Representatives, 66th District

== See also ==
- Loveland Park, Ohio
