= Little Miami Scenic Trail =

Rail trail in southwestern Ohio, United States

Coordinates: 39.80723°N 83.88795°W

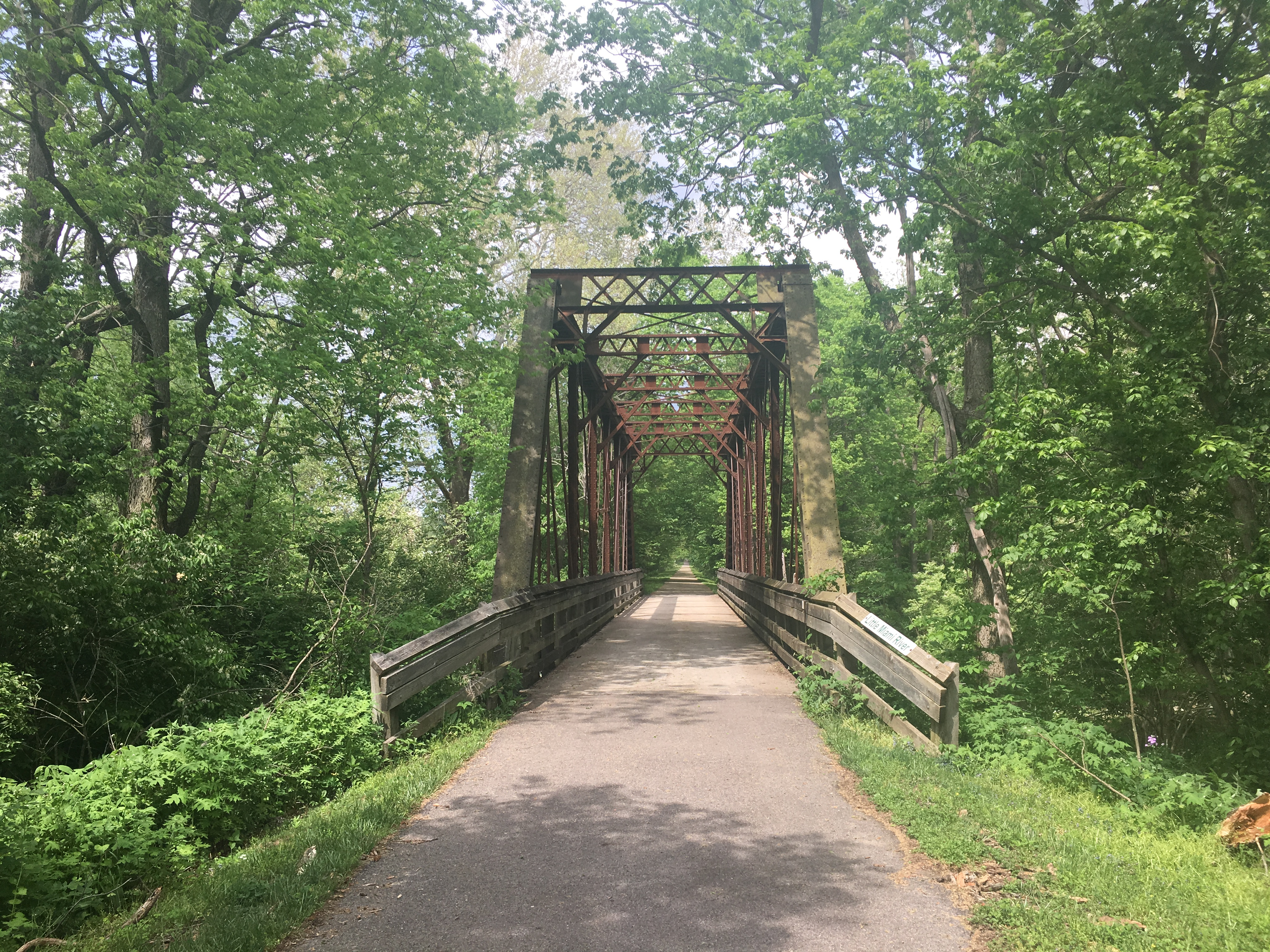
- Little Miami Scenic Trail, crossing the Little Miami River near Xenia, Ohio, May 2018
- Length: 78.1 mi (125.7 km)
- Location: Southwestern Ohio
- Designation: USBR 21 (Xenia–Cincinnati); USBR 50 (Xenia); State Bike Route 1 (Xenia–Cincinnati); State Bike Route 3 (Springfield–Xenia); North Country National Scenic Trail (Yellow Springs–Newtown)
- Trailheads: Springfield to Cincinnati
- Use: Cycling, walking, rollerblading, horseback riding
- Elevation change: −486 ft (−148 m)
- Highest point: Springfield trailhead
- Lowest point: Armleder Park, Cincinnati
- Difficulty: Easy (fully accessible)
- Season: Year-round

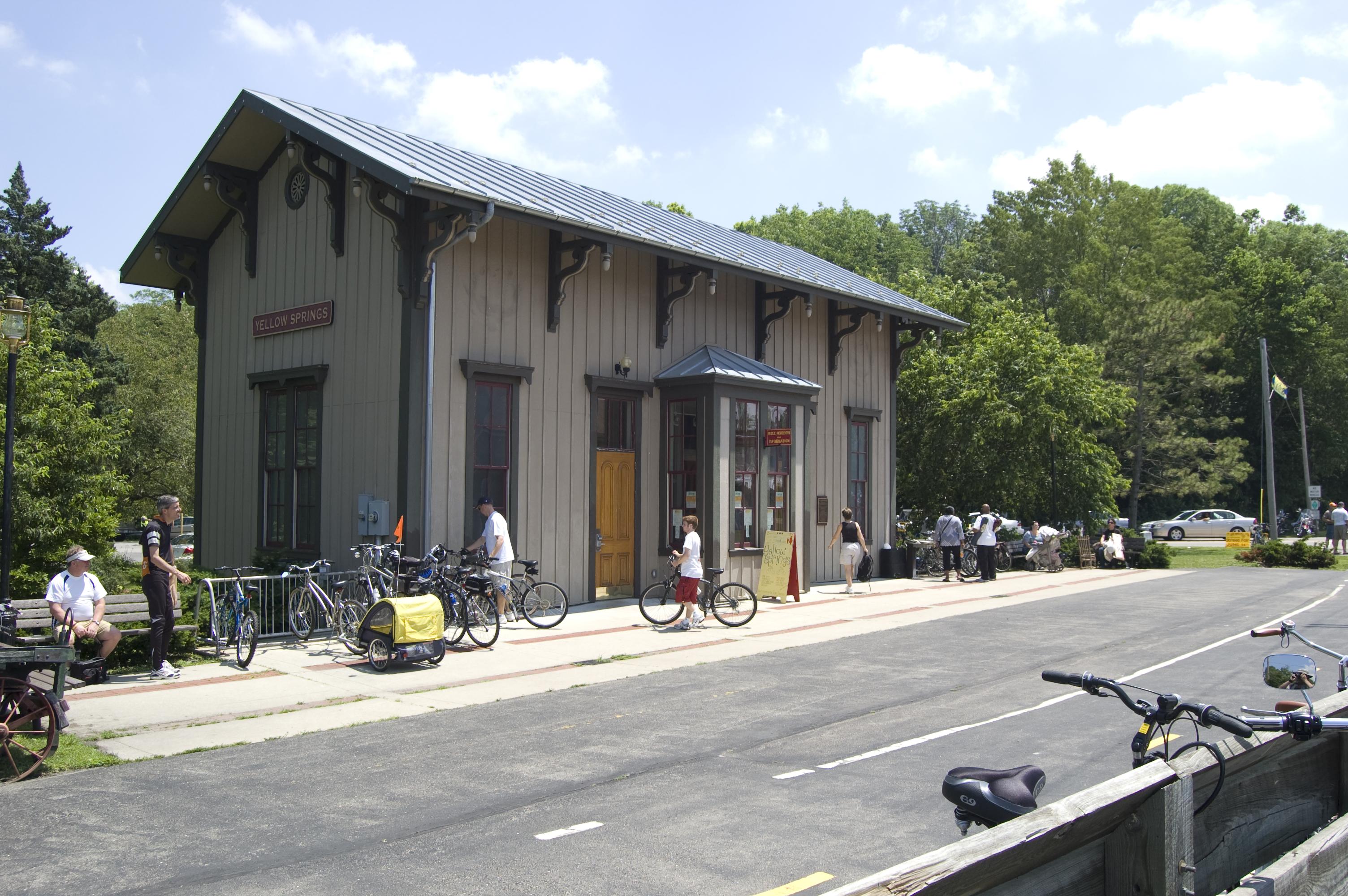
Yellow Springs Station in Greene County

The Little Miami Scenic Trail is the fourth longest paved trail in the United States, running 78.1 miles (125.7 km) through five southwestern counties in the state of Ohio. The multi-use rail trail sees heavy recreational use by hikers and bicyclists, as well as the occasional horseback rider. Over 700,000 people made use of the trail in 2014.

Most of the trail runs along the banks of the Little Miami River, in a dedicated, car-free corridor known as Little Miami State Park. This unusually linear state park passes through four counties, with a right-of-way running about 50 miles (80 km) long and averaging 66 feet (20 m) in width for a total of about 400 acres (160 ha). Elsewhere, the corridor ranges from 8 to 10 feet (2.4 to 3.0 m) in width.

The Little Miami Scenic Trail is signposted as State Bike Route 1 south of Xenia and State Bike Route 3 throughout. It is the backbone of a nearly continuous network of paved multi-use trails, centered on the Miami Valley area, that stretches 330 miles (530 km) and connects the Cincinnati, Dayton, and Columbus metropolitan areas. The Little Miami trail is an incrementally growing section of the Buckeye Trail and North Country National Scenic Trail, while the trail south of Xenia also forms the southern leg of the Ohio to Erie Trail and part of U.S. Bicycle Route 21.

== History ==
The largely wooded corridor was created along the right-of-way of the old Little Miami Railroad. The original railway bed is still visible beside the trail in various places along the trail route.

Together with the Ohio Department of Natural Resources, the local governments of Xenia and Yellow Springs purchased land along the abandoned railroad from 1973 to 1983. In 1979, the land became an Ohio State Park. In 1979, ODNR studied developing the corridor as a scenic railroad up to 27.8 miles (44.7 km) long from Loveland to Corwin, as well as a bike trail and bridle trail. However, ODNR prioritized the trails, allowing the bankrupt Penn Central Transportation Company to salvage the rails and ties, which made building new tracks cost-prohibitive. The trail was strongly supported by residents and officials in Loveland, where a park was being developed around the Loveland Bike Trail, but was opposed by residents of Terrace Park, who were concerned about crime. The first 13 miles (21 km) of the trail from Morrow to Loveland was paved in late 1983 and officially opened on May 16, 1984. Two years later, the Ohio Department of Transportation received a grant from the Federal Highway Administration to complete the trail.

By December 20, 1991, the trail officially stretched from Spring Valley in Greene County to the Terrace Park village limit in Hamilton County, across the river from Milford. The trail was extended northward to Xenia later that year and to Springfield in 1998. In 2006, after a protracted, 26-year battle with Terrace Park residents, it was extended southward to Newtown.

Markers for state bike routes 1 and 3 (combined) are posted between Newtown and Xenia.

In the late 2000s, state budget cuts caused portions of the trail to fall into disrepair, resulting in the temporary closure of some wooden bridges and rest areas. However, an organization called the Friends of the Little Miami State Park Group was founded late 2008 to focus attention and finances on critical portions to keep the trail open and make it safer. Most of the bridges within state park boundaries were paved or re-planked in 2009. In 2010, a failed parks levy prompted the Clark County Park District to indefinitely close its 5.6-mile (9.0 km) stretch of the trail, posting "No Trespassing" signs at park entrances. Because this stretch of trail was partially built with federal funds, the Ohio Department of Natural Resources attempted to force its reopening. The district reopened its parks in April 2011 with volunteer support.

Originally designated State Bike Route 1, the Little Miami Scenic Trail was renumbered in 2011 as State Bike Route 1 south of Xenia and State Bike Route 3 throughout. The concurrency from Newtown to Xenia is marked with "⅓" signs.

In the 2000s, the Adventure Cycling Association and OKI Regional Council proposed designating the Little Miami Scenic Trail as part of U.S. Bicycle Route 25. However, the Ohio Department of Transportation later planned to designate State Bike Route 1, including the Little Miami Scenic Trail south of Xenia, as USBR 21; USBR 25 would instead follow the Great Miami River Recreation Trail to the west. ODOT formally proposed a USBR 21 alignment to the American Association of State Highway and Transportation Officials in spring 2021, which the committee approved. In 2022, a dedicated bridge opened in Cincinnati, spanning the Little Miami River and connecting the trail to other trails toward Downtown Cincinnati.

== Current route ==
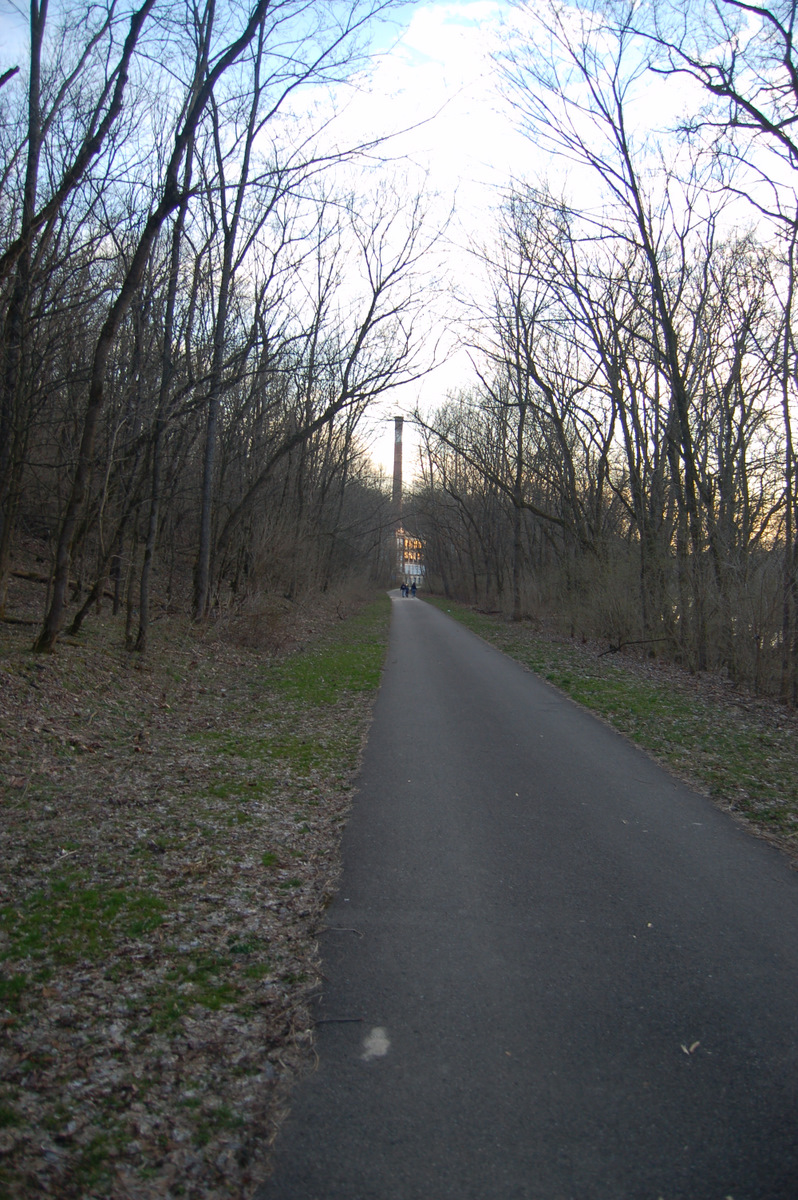
The Little Miami Scenic Trail as it approaches the former Peters Cartridge Company factory in Warren County

Xenia made a deal to be the official start of the trail for a donation of land, making the mile markers change from the previous start. For the first 9 miles (14 km) to Xenia, the Little Miami Scenic Trail is operated by the Clark County Park District and the National Trail Parks and Recreation District. From the Simon Kenton Trailhead in Springfield, the Little Miami trail runs southward parallel to U.S. Route 68 and continues to Yellow Springs. Near John Bryan State Park, the North Country Trail and Buckeye Trail enter from Dayton to the west. For the next 15 miles (24 km) to Spring Valley, the Little Miami trail is managed by Greene County. At Xenia Station, it meets the Creekside Trail, as well as the Prairie Grass Trail, on which the Ohio to Erie Trail and U.S. Bicycle Route 21 continue north to Columbus. A short segment of the Little Miami trail that connects the Creekside and Prairie Grass trails is also designated as U.S. Bike Route 50.

Little Miami State Park begins at Hedges Road in Spring Valley, quickly meets the banks of the Little Miami River, and follows U.S. 42 into Warren County. It passes through Corwin (near Waynesville), Caesar Creek State Park, and Oregonia, where the Buckeye Trail rejoins. At Fort Ancient, the trail runs under the imposing Jeremiah Morrow Bridge (Interstate 71). It then passes through the downtown districts of Morrow and South Lebanon to the former Middletown Junction, where the Lebanon Countryside Trail begins.

The Little Miami trail continues southward, opposite the river from Kings Mills and the rear of the expansive Kings Island park grounds. At this location the historic Peters Cartridge Company facility overlooks the bike trail. The trail passes under U.S. 22/State Route 3 at Fosters, across the river from the Landen Mounds. It continues by a few final cornfields before entering Clermont County and downtown Loveland, where it is known as the Loveland Bike Trail.

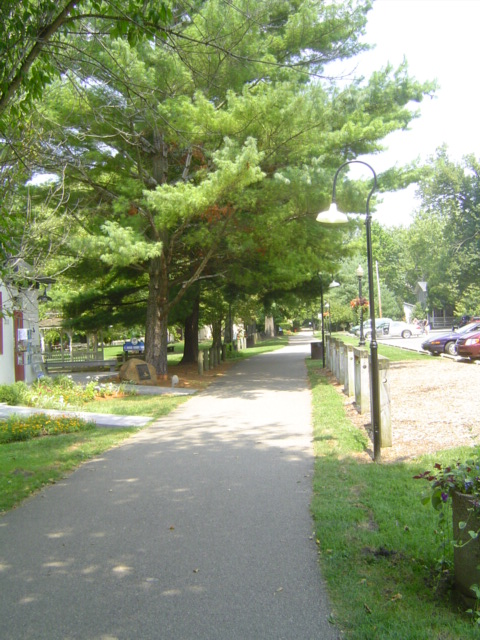
Loveland Bike Trail in Clermont County

At Miamiville, the trail crosses to the western, Hamilton County side of the Little Miami River, as it meets State Route 126 (Glendale–Milford Road). The trail passes by Camp Dennison and its former southern terminus in Milford. A 2006 extension carries the Little Miami State Park along U.S. 50 (Wooster Pike) to Avoca Park in Terrace Park. From here, USBR 21, State Bicycle Route 1, and the Loveland section of the Buckeye Trail branch off, following local roads southwest to Cincinnati. A short Great Parks extension leads the Little Miami trail back across the river, beside local roads, to the Little Miami Golf Center in Newtown. The North Country Trail and the Williamsburg section of the Buckeye Trail continue southeast along heavily trafficked roads to Batavia and East Fork State Park.

The Little Miami Scenic Trail continues south another 3.2 miles (5.1 km) from the Little Miami Golf Center south to Clear Creek Park and along State Route 32 to Beechmont Avenue (State Route 125), across from Otto Armleder Memorial Park. Finally, the trail follows a dedicated bridge parallel to Beechmont Avenue over the Little Miami River to the Armleder Trail Connector in Armleder Park, the Lunken Loop around Lunken Field, and the Ohio River Trail westward toward downtown Cincinnati.

== Economic effects ==
Studies in 2008 and 2011 found that single-family residential properties increased in value with increased proximity to the Little Miami Scenic Trail.

== See also ==
- Ohio to Erie Trail
