= Joshua I. Smith =

American businessman

Joshua Smith (born April 8, 1941) is an American businessman and former chairperson of the Commission on Minority Business Development.

== Biography ==
Joshua Isaac Smith was born on April 8, 1941, in Garrard County, Kentucky. Growing up in Loveland, Ohio, he graduated from Loveland High School in 1959. He earned a Bachelor of Science degree from Central State University in Wilberforce, Ohio in 1963. He worked as a high school biology teacher in Washington, D.C., for a short time, and taught biology and chemistry at the University of Akron, where he also studied law. In 1969, he became a manager at the New York division of Plenum Publishing Corporation. He served as an executive director of American Society for Information Science from 1973 to 1977. Smith attended management courses at the University of Delaware and Central Michigan University. He founded the computer firm Maxima Corp in 1978, following the breakup of his first marriage. By 1993 the company had revenues over US$41 million and had been ranked by Black Enterprise magazine at number 33 in its list of minority businesses. In 1996 the company had expanded to operate in 14 US states, employing 800 members of staff. Smith serves as a trustee on a number of boards, and has been a strong advocate for black entrepreneurship. According to Jet magazine, Smith became the "leading spokesman for Black businessmen under the Reagan and Bush [George H] administrations". In 1989, he was appointed by President George H. W. Bush to be the chair of the Commission on Minority Business Development. Smith's recommendations for improving the lot of small businesses from minority groups were largely ignored by the President. The company filed for bankruptcy protection in 1998, largely the result of expensive litigation between the company and Smith's son. Smith Sr. had sacked his son as vice president in 1993.

In 2003 Smith was appointed chairperson of the State of Maryland's Task Force on Minority Business Reform, advancing to serve as an advisor to the Maryland Governor's Commission on Minority Business Reform. As of 2009 Smith serves as chairman and managing partner of the Coaching Group, a position he has held since 1998. Other directorships include CardioComm Solutions Inc., Caterpillar Inc., Federal Express Corporation and The Allstate Corporation. Smith has been a director of Caterpillar since 1993. In 2008, Smith launched a weekly radio show Biz Talk with Josh Smith, which ran on CBS Radio in Washington, D.C.

Smith was named distinguished alumnus by Loveland Schools Foundation in 2012. In March 2014, Smith donated US$1 million to his alma mater Central State University. In October 2014, the university renamed one of its buildings to Joshua I. Smith Center for Education and Natural Sciences to honor Smith. In November 2014, Smith received the Thurgood Marshall College Fund HBCU Alumnus of the Year award at the 26th TMCF Awards Gala.

Smith has been married to his wife Reverend Jacqueline Jones-Smith since 1979, and lives in Washington, D.C.
