= Nancy Ford Cones =

American photographer (1869–1962)

Nancy Ford Cones (September 11, 1869 – January 3, 1962) was an early photographer from Loveland, Ohio, where she documented country life.

== Biography ==
Born in Milan, Ohio in 1868, Cones was a doctor's daughter. When she was 25, her father sent her to a photographic studio to learn how to retouch after which she began taking photographs herself in the pictorial style. Impressed by her early work, her father bought her an interest in a studio in Mechanicsburg, Ohio. In 1900, she married James Cones, also a photographer, who assisted her with darkroom work, frequently using the gum bichromate printing process. The couple first moved to Covington, Kentucky where they ran a studio together before settling at Roads Inn farm near Loveland, Ohio in 1905. That year, with a photograph title "Threading the needle", Cones finished second to Eduard Steichen in an Eastman Kodak competition which attracted 28,000 entries. Her "Calling The Ferryman" came in first in the Photo-Era contest in 1907. Most of her photographs were of family and friends on the farm. They proved popular for the advertising campaigns of Eastman Kodak, Bausch & Lomb and other camera firms. Some of them also appeared in Country Life in America and Woman's Home Companion. In 1926, the couple spent a year in Mariemont, Ohio, where they had been commissioned to photograph the new town.

Nancy Cones' interest in photography came to an end after her husband's death in 1939. She remained on the Loveland family farm where she died in 1962.
