= Loveland Bike Trail =

Bike trail in Southwest Ohio

Coordinates: 39°16′5″N 84°15′30.5″W

- Location: Ohio, United States

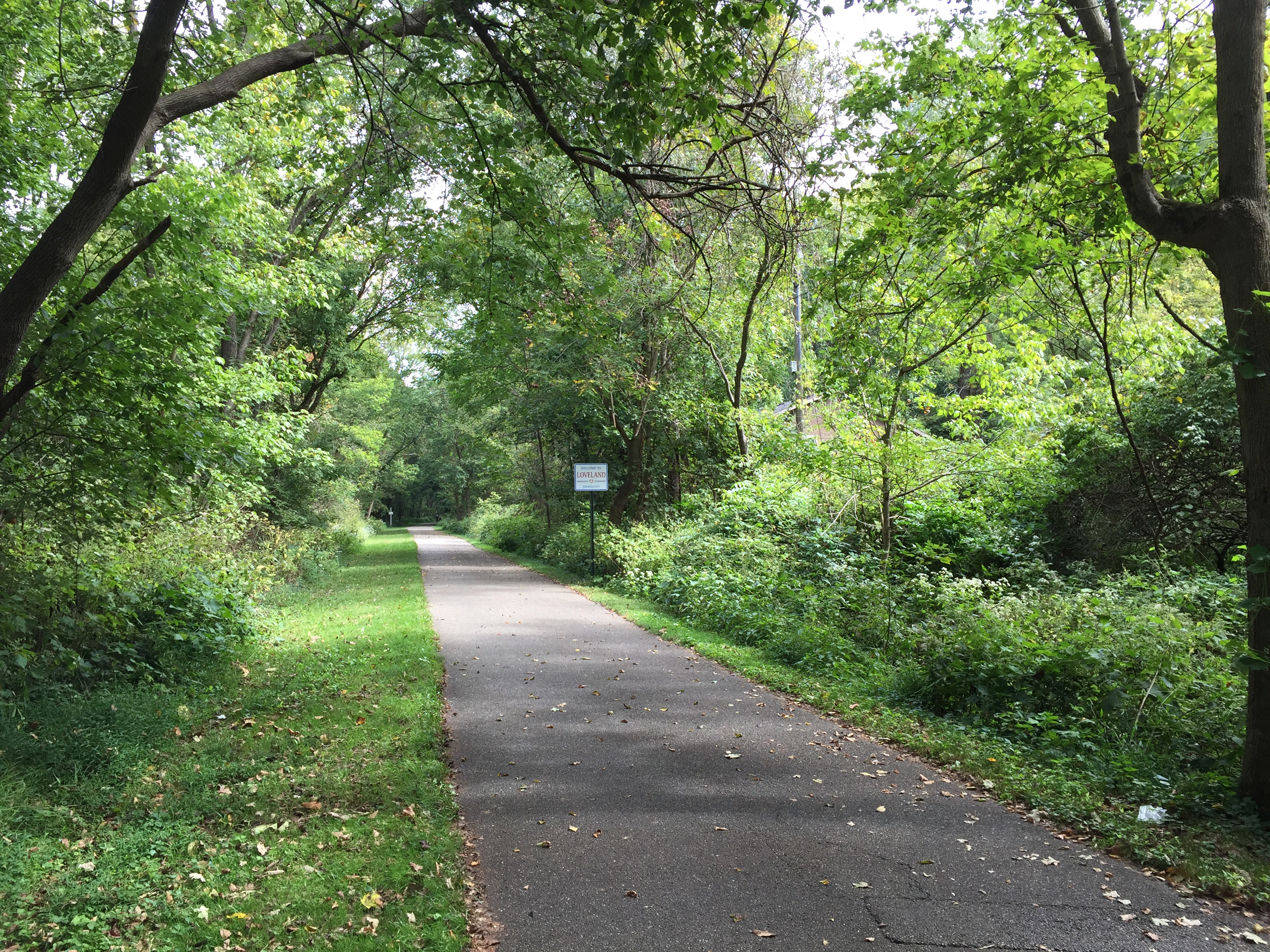
Welcome sign at the Loveland city limits

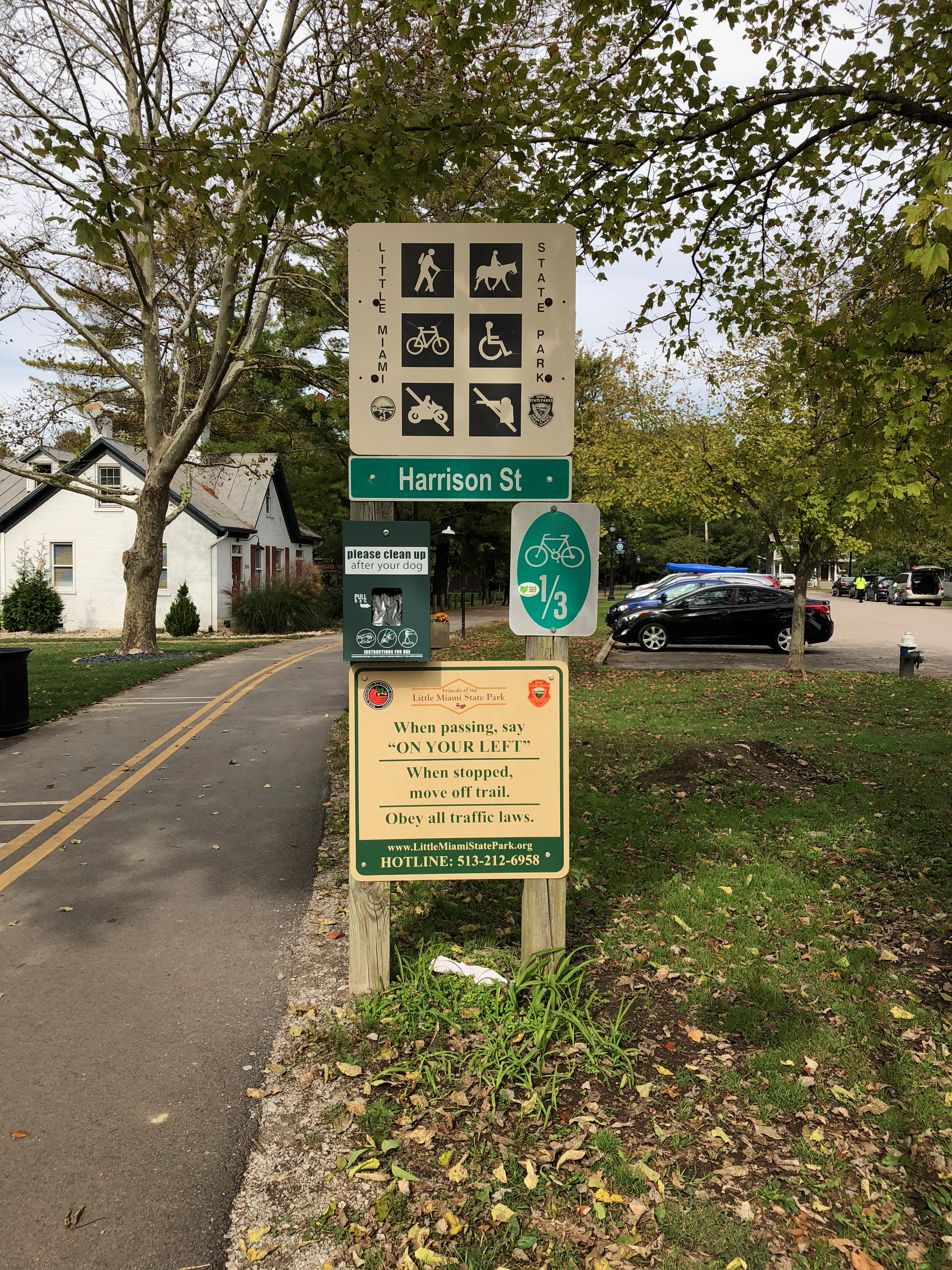
Looking north from Harrison Street

The Loveland Bike Trail is a rail trail in Ohio. It is a section of the Little Miami Scenic Trail within the Loveland, Ohio city limits in Clermont County. Like most of the longer trail, it was built along the right-of-way of the abandoned Little Miami Railroad, on the Little Miami River. Along with 15 other city parks, the trail corridor is maintained by City of Loveland Recreation Commission. The trail was opened in the 1980s and became part of the Little Miami Scenic Trail in 1984. More than 100,000 people accessed the Little Miami Scenic Trail via the Loveland trailhead in 2014.

Each summer from 1997 to 2000 and from 2002 to 2004, the city held a cycling race, Tour de Loveland, named after the Tour de France, that promoted the Loveland Bike Trail as the centerpiece of Historic Downtown Loveland. It featured a route for professional cyclists that included many Downtown streets, as well as separate races for younger cyclists. In June 1998, the USA Cycling Elite National Championship time trials and criterium were held in conjunction with the Tour de Loveland. On January 24, 2005, Loveland City Council voted to cancel the Tour, due to declining attendance and a lack of sponsors.
