= Miamiville, Ohio =

Unincorporated community in Ohio, United States

- Census-designated place
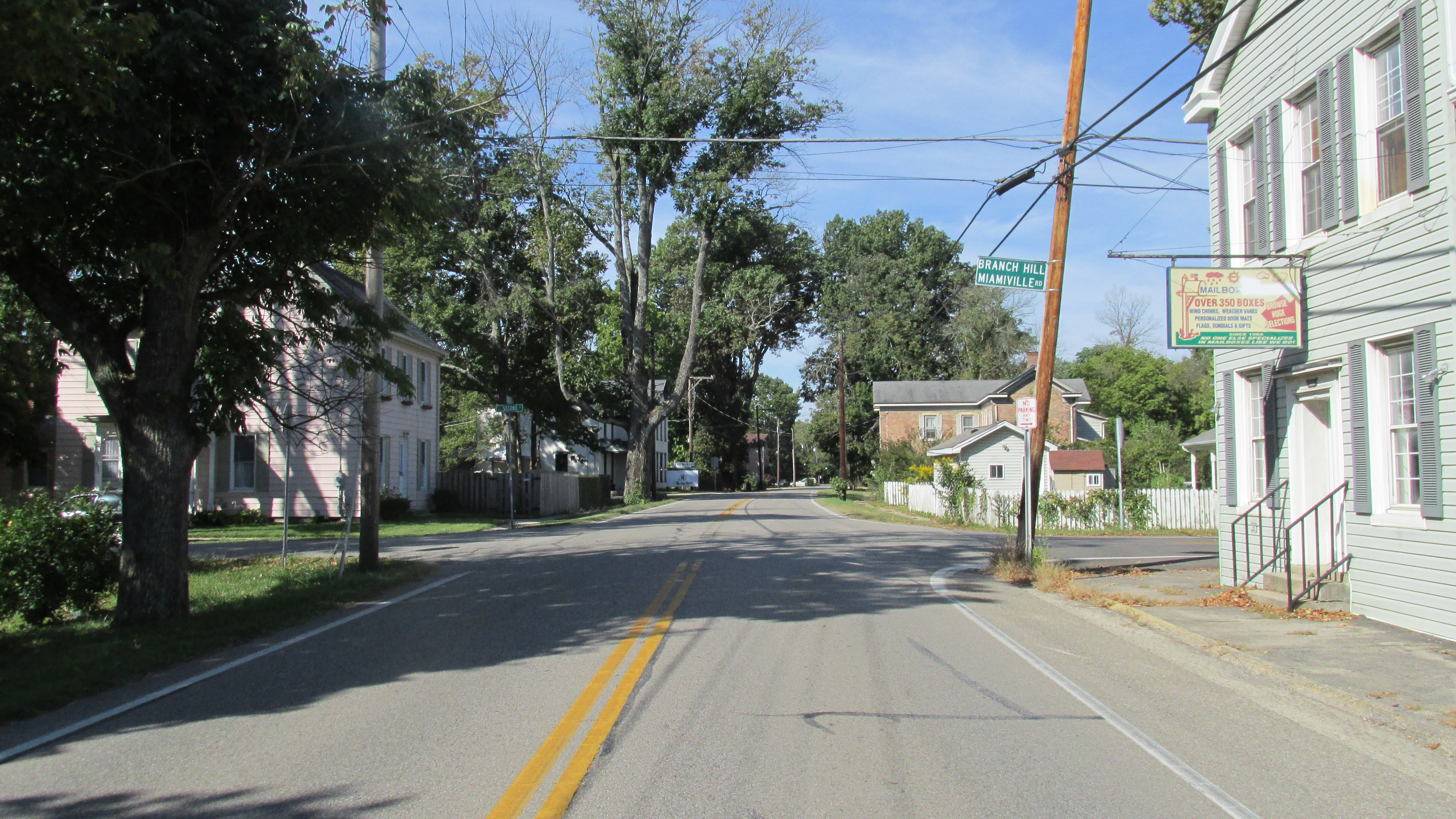
- Looking west on Center Street in Miamiville

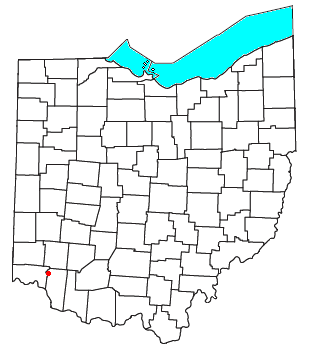
- Location of Miamiville, Ohio
- Coordinates: 39°12′44″N 84°18′00″W
- Country: United States
- State: Ohio
- County: Clermont
- Township: Miami
- Elevation: 587 ft (179 m)

Population (2020)
  - Total: 205
- Time zone: UTC-5 (Eastern (EST))
  - Summer (DST): UTC-4 (EDT)
- ZIP code: 45147
- Area code: 513
- GNIS feature ID: 2628932

Miamiville is an unincorporated community and census-designated place (CDP) in western Miami Township, Clermont County, Ohio, United States, along the Little Miami River and the Loveland Bike Trail. It had a population of 205 at the 2020 census. It has a post office with the ZIP code 45147.

== History ==
Miamiville was laid out in 1849, and named for the nearby Little Miami River. A post office called Miamiville has been in operation since 1848.

Miamiville's low profile as an unincorporated community was a benefit during the Great Depression, when Prohibition outlawed alcohol consumption in the United States. The Miami Boat Club operated as a speakeasy during the 1920s and 1930s.

Miamiville also played a small role in the Civil War during the Battle of Miamiville as rebels known as Morgan's Raids marched toward Camp Dennison and Cincinnati in the 1860s.

== Gallery ==
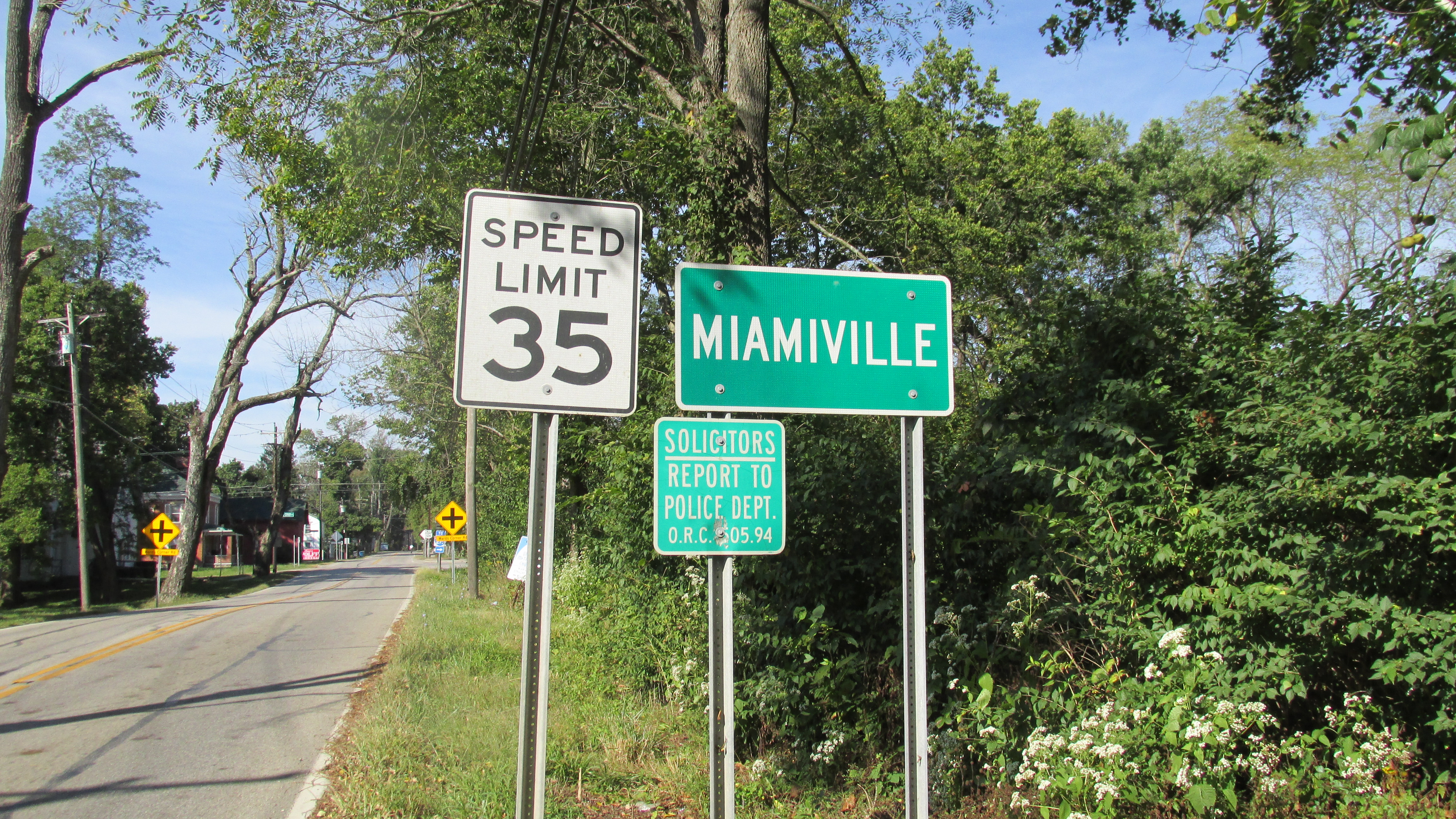
Miamiville community sign

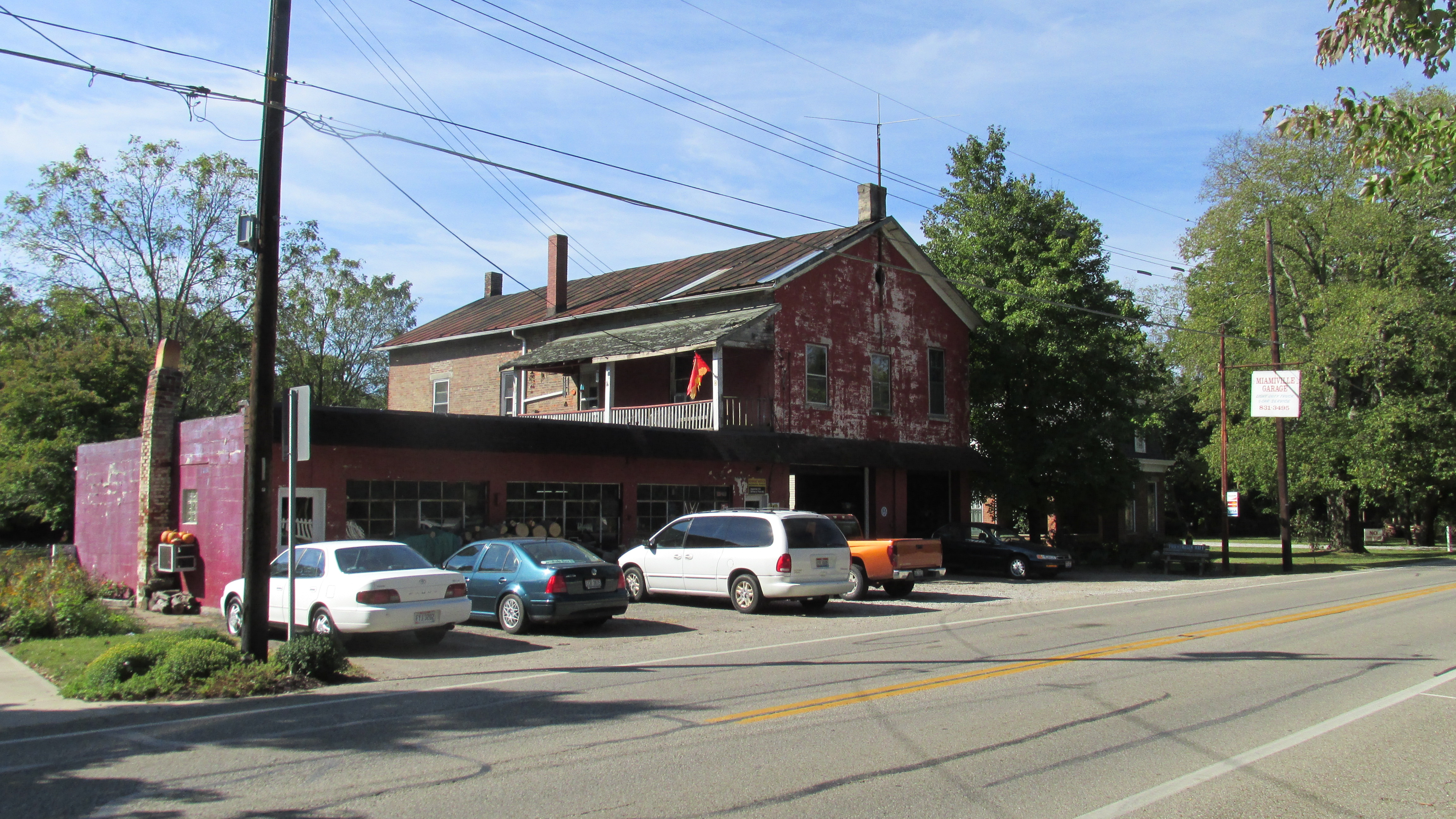
Miamiville Garage in Miamiville
