= List of Ohio railroads =

The following railroads operate in the U.S. state of Ohio.

== Common freight carriers ==
- Akron Barberton Cluster Railway (AB)
- Ann Arbor Railroad (AA), (Watco)
- Ashland Railway (ASRY)
- Ashtabula, Carson and Jefferson Railroad (ACJR)
- Belpre Industrial, Parkersburg Railroad (BIP)
- Camp Chase Railway (CAMY)
- Canadian National Railway (CN) through subsidiaries Bessemer and Lake Erie Railroad (BLE) and Grand Trunk Western Railroad (GTW)
- Central Railroad of Indiana (CIND) (owned by Genesee & Wyoming (GWI))
- Chicago, Fort Wayne and Eastern Railroad (CFE) (owned by GWI)
  - Operates Delphos Terminal
- Cincinnati East Terminal Railway (CET)
- Cleveland Commercial Railroad (CCRL)
- Cleveland Harbor Belt Railroad (CHB)
- Cleveland Works Railway (CWRO)
- Columbus and Ohio River Rail Road (CUOH) (owned by GWI)
- CSX Transportation (CSXT) including subsidiary Three Rivers Railway
- Flats Industrial Railroad (FIR)
- Grand River Railway (GRRY)
- Indiana Eastern Railroad (IERR)
- Indiana Northeastern Railroad (IN)
- Indiana and Ohio Railway (IORY) (owned by GWI)
  - Operates South Charleston Railroad, West Central Ohio Port Authority
- Kanawha River Railroad (KNWA) (Watco)
- Lake Terminal Railroad (LT)
- Lorain Northern Railroad (LNOR)
- Mahoning Valley Railway (MVRY) (owned by GWI)
- Napoleon, Defiance & Western Railroad (NDW), (Pioneer Lines)
- Newburgh and South Shore Railroad (NSR) (Omnitrax)
- Norfolk Southern Railway (NS) including subsidiary Cincinnati, New Orleans and Texas Pacific Railway (CNTP)
- Northern Ohio and Western Railway (NOW)
- Ohio and National Railway Company (ONRR)
- Ohi-Rail Corporation (OHIC) (taken over by Mahoning Valley Railway (MVRY))
- Ohio Central Railroad (OHCR) (owned by GWI)
- Ohio South Central Railroad (OSCR)
- Ohio Southern Railroad (OSRR) (owned by GWI)
- Ohio Terminal Railway (OHIO)
- Republic N&T Railroad (NTRY)
- R.J. Corman Railroad/Cleveland Line (RJCL)
- R.J. Corman Railroad/Western Ohio Lines (RJCW)
- RSL Railroad (RSL)
- Warren and Trumbull Railroad (WTRM) (owned by GWI)
- Wheeling and Lake Erie Railway (WE)
- Youngstown and Austintown Railroad (YARR) (owned by GWI)
- Youngstown Belt Railroad (YB) (owned by GWI)
- Youngstown and Southeastern Railroad (YSRR)
  - Operates Eastern States Railroad and Ohio and Pennsylvania Railroad (OHPA)

== Private freight carriers ==
Name	Reporting Mark
AK Steel	AKS
Railserve	RSSX
Shelly Materials	SHIX
Temperance Yard Corporation	TYCX
U.S. Rail Corporation	USRC
Centrus	NULL
Dupps Company	DUKX

== Passenger carriers ==
Name	Reporting Mark	Type
Amtrak	AMTK	Intercity
Cincinnati Bell Connector	NULL	Rapid transit
Cuyahoga Valley Scenic Railroad	CVSR	Tourist
Hocking Valley Scenic Railway	HVSR	Tourist
Lake Shore Railway Association	NULL	Tourist
Lebanon Mason Monroe Railroad	CRC	Tourist
RTA Rapid Transit	RTA	Rapid transit
Toledo, Lake Erie and Western Railway	TLEW	Tourist
Zanesville & Western Scenic Railroad	ZWSX	Tourist

== Defunct railroads ==
Name	Mark	System (Note: This is one or more of the Class I railroads that the railroad became part of, if any.)	From	To	Successor	Notes
Addyston and Ohio River Railroad			1889	1914	N/A	
Adena Railroad		W&LE	1901	1916	Wheeling and Lake Erie Railway	
Adena, Cadiz and New Athens Railway		W&LE	1914	1917	Wheeling and Lake Erie Railway	
Akron and Barberton Belt Railroad	A&BB, ABB	ACY/ B&O/ ERIE/ PRR	1902	1994	Akron Barberton Cluster Railway	
Akron Branch of the Cleveland and Pittsburgh Railroad		PRR	1851	1853	Cleveland, Zanesville and Cincinnati Railroad	
Akron, Canton and Youngstown Railroad	ACY	ACY	1944	1982	Norfolk and Western Railway	
Akron, Canton and Youngstown Railway	ACY	ACY	1907	1944	Akron, Canton and Youngstown Railroad	
Akron and Chicago Junction Railroad		B&O	1890	1915	Baltimore and Ohio Railroad	
Akron and New Castle Railroad		ACY	1892	1907	Akron, Canton and Youngstown Railway	
Akron and Pittsburgh Railroad		ACY	1895	1899	Northern Ohio Railway	
Akron Terminal Railway		ACY/ B&O/ ERIE/ PRR	1901	1901	Barberton, Akron and Eastern Railway	
Akron Transfer Railroad		ACY	1891	1902	Richland and Mahoning Railway	
Akron Union Passenger Depot Company		B&O/ PRR	1891	1975	N/A	
Alliance and Lake Erie Railroad		NYC	1878	1882	Cleveland, Youngstown and Pittsburgh Railway	
Alliance, Niles and Ashtabula Railroad		PRR	1881	1887	Ashtabula, Niles and Youngstown Railroad	
Alliance and Northern Railroad		NYC	1891	1902	Lake Erie, Alliance and Wheeling Railroad	
American Central Railway		NKP	1859	1864	Cleveland, Fort Wayne and Chicago Railroad	
American Midland Railway			1889	1890	Findlay and Western Railroad	
Ann Arbor Railroad	AA	AA	1895	1976	Consolidated Rail Corporation	
Ashland and Western Railroad		ERIE/ PRR	1904	1906	Ashland and Western Railway	
Ashland and Western Railway		ERIE/ PRR	1906	1913	Lorain, Ashland and Southern Railroad	
Ashland and Wooster Railway		ERIE/ PRR	1897	1903	Lake and River Railway	
Ashtabula and New Lisbon Railroad		ERIE, PRR	1853	1870	Ashtabula, Youngstown and Pittsburgh Railroad, Niles and New Lisbon Railway	
Ashtabula, Niles and Youngstown Railroad		PRR	1887	1887	Pittsburgh, Youngstown and Ashtabula Railroad	
Ashtabula and Pittsburgh Railway		PRR	1878	1887	Ashtabula, Niles and Youngstown Railroad	
Ashtabula, Youngstown and Pittsburgh Railroad		PRR	1870	1878	Ashtabula and Pittsburgh Railway	
Athens, Amesville and Chauncey Railway		C&O	1903	1909	Hocking Valley Railway	
Atlantic and Great Western Railroad		ERIE	1871	1880	New York, Pennsylvania and Ohio Railroad	
Atlantic and Great Western Railroad		ERIE	1853	1865	Atlantic and Great Western Railway	
Atlantic and Great Western Railway		ERIE	1865	1871	Atlantic and Great Western Railroad	
Atlantic and Lake Erie Railway		NYC	1869	1876	Ohio Central Railway	
Baltimore and Ohio Railroad	B&O, BO	B&O	1866	1987	Chesapeake and Ohio Railway	
Baltimore and Ohio and Chicago Railroad		B&O	1876	1949	Baltimore and Ohio Railroad	
Baltimore and Ohio Southwestern Railroad		B&O	1899	1949	Baltimore and Ohio Railroad	
Baltimore and Ohio Southwestern Railroad		B&O	1889	1893	Baltimore and Ohio Southwestern Railway	
Baltimore and Ohio Southwestern Railway		B&O	1893	1899	Cincinnati, Portsmouth and Parkersburg Railway	
Baltimore and Ohio Southwestern Terminal Company		B&O	1891	1899	Baltimore and Ohio Southwestern Railroad	
Baltimore and Ohio, Toledo and Michigan Railroad		PRR	1870	1871	Toledo, Tiffin and Eastern Railroad	
Baltimore, Pittsburgh and Chicago Railway		B&O	1872	1876	Baltimore and Ohio and Chicago Railroad	
Baltimore, Pittsburgh and Continental Railroad		ERIE	1871	1873	Chicago and Atlantic Railway	
Baltimore Short Line Railway		B&O	1870	1888	Cincinnati, Washington and Baltimore Railroad	
Barberton, Akron and Eastern Railway		ACY/ B&O/ ERIE/ PRR	1901	1902	Barberton, Akron and Eastern Belt Line Railway	
Barberton, Akron and Eastern Belt Line Railway		ACY/ B&O/ ERIE/ PRR	1902	1902	Akron and Barberton Belt Railroad	
Barberton Belt Line Railroad		ACY/ B&O/ ERIE/ PRR	1891	1902	Akron and Barberton Belt Railroad	
Barberton and Southern Railroad		ACY/ B&O/ ERIE/ PRR	1899	1905	Akron and Barberton Belt Railroad	
Bay Terminal Railroad			1895	1955	N/A	
Bellaire, Beaver Valley and Shawnee Railway		B&O	1879	1882	Wheeling and Cincinnati Mineral Railway	
Bellaire and St. Clairsville Railway		B&O	1885	1888	Central Ohio Railroad	
Bellaire and St. Clairsville Narrow Gauge Railway		B&O	1876	1880	St. Clairsville Railway	
Bellaire and South Western Railway		PRR	1875	1882	Bellaire, Zanesville and Cincinnati Railway	
Bellaire and Valley Junction Railway		W&LE	1890	1901	Adena Railroad	
Bellaire, Zanesville and Cincinnati Railway		PRR	1882	1902	Ohio River and Western Railway	
Bellefontaine Railway		NYC	1864	1868	Cleveland, Columbus, Cincinnati and Indianapolis Railway	
Bellefontaine and Indiana Railroad		NYC	1848	1864	Bellefontaine Railway	
Belmont Central Railroad		B&O	1907	1914	Cleveland, Lorain and Wheeling Railway	
Belpre and Cincinnati Railroad		B&O	1845	1851	Marietta and Cincinnati Railroad	
Bowling Green Railroad		B&O	1874	1943	Toledo and Cincinnati Railroad	
Butler and Detroit Railroad		WAB	1880	1881	Detroit, Butler and St. Louis Railroad	
Canal Belt Railroad		ERIE				
Canton and Waynesburgh Railroad		W&LE	1884	1888	Waynesburg and Canton Railroad	
Canton and Wooster Railroad						
Carroll County Railroad		W&LE	1850	1866	Carrollton and Oneida Railroad	
Carrollton and Oneida Railroad		W&LE	1866	1873	Ohio and Toledo Railroad	
Celina, Van Wert and State Line Extension of the Columbus and North-Western Railway		NYC	1878	1881	Cincinnati, Van Wert and Michigan Railroad	
Central Columbiana and Pennsylvania Railway	CQPA		2001	2004	Ohio and Pennsylvania Railroad	
Central Ohio Railroad		B&O	1847	1915	Baltimore and Ohio Railroad	
Central Union Depot and Railway Company of Cincinnati		B&O/NYC	1884	1935	N/A	
Central Valley Railway		W&LE	1901	1916	Wheeling and Lake Erie Railroad	
Chagrin Falls and Lake Erie Railroad		W&LE	1901	1916	Wheeling and Lake Erie Railway	
Chagrin Falls and Southern Railroad		W&LE	1880	1890	Cleveland, Chagrin Falls and Northern Railroad	
Chesapeake and Hocking Railway		C&O	1926	1930	Chesapeake and Ohio Railway	
Chesapeake and Ohio Railway	C&O, CO	C&O	1889	1987	CSX Transportation	
Chesapeake and Ohio Northern Railway		C&O	1914	1930	Chesapeake and Ohio Railway	
Chesapeake and Ohio Railway of Indiana		C&O	1910	1934	Chesapeake and Ohio Railway	
Chicago and Atlantic Railway		ERIE	1873	1890	Chicago and Erie Railroad	
Chicago, Cincinnati and Louisville Railroad		C&O	1903	1910	Chesapeake and Ohio Railway of Indiana	
Chicago and Erie Railroad		ERIE	1890	1941	Erie Railroad	
Chicago and Canada Southern Railway		NYC	1871	1888	Detroit and Chicago Railroad	
Chicago, St. Louis and Pittsburgh Railroad		PRR	1883	1890	Pittsburgh, Cincinnati, Chicago and St. Louis Railway	
Chicago, Zanesville and Atlantic Railway		B&O	1885	1886	Zanesville and Ohio River Railway	
Cincinnati and Baltimore Railway		B&O	1868	1894	Cincinnati, Washington and Baltimore Railroad	
Cincinnati, Batavia and Williamsburg Railroad		N&W	1876	1876	Cincinnati and Eastern Railway	
Cincinnati, Columbus and Hocking Valley Railway		DT&I	1881	1886	Ohio Southern Railroad	
Cincinnati Connecting Belt Railroad		N&W	1899	1901	Cincinnati, Portsmouth and Virginia Railroad	
Cincinnati and Dayton Railway		B&O	1887	1943	Toledo and Cincinnati Railroad	
Cincinnati, Dayton and Chicago Railroad		B&O	1891	1895	Cincinnati, Hamilton and Dayton Railway	
Cincinnati, Dayton and Ironton Railroad		B&O	1891	1895	Cincinnati, Hamilton and Dayton Railway	
Cincinnati and Eastern Railway		N&W	1876	1887	Ohio and North Western Railroad	
Cincinnati, Findlay and Fort Wayne Railway			1903	1919	N/A	
Cincinnati, Georgetown and Portsmouth Railroad	CG&P		1873			
Cincinnati and Hamilton Railroad		B&O	1846	1847	Cincinnati, Hamilton and Dayton Railroad	
Cincinnati, Hamilton and Dayton Railroad		B&O	1847	1895	Cincinnati, Hamilton and Dayton Railway	
Cincinnati, Hamilton and Dayton Railway		B&O	1895	1917	Toledo and Cincinnati Railroad	
Cincinnati, Hamilton and Indianapolis Railroad		B&O	1872	1902	Cincinnati, Indianapolis and Western Railway	
Cincinnati and Indiana Railroad		NYC	1861	1880	Cincinnati, Indianapolis, St. Louis and Chicago Railway	
Cincinnati and Indiana Western Railroad		C&O	1902	1903	Chicago, Cincinnati and Louisville Railroad	
Cincinnati, Indianapolis, St. Louis and Chicago Railway		NYC	1880	1889	Cleveland, Cincinnati, Chicago and St. Louis Railway	
Cincinnati, Indianapolis and Western Railroad	CIWN	B&O	1915	1990	CSX Transportation	
Cincinnati, Indianapolis and Western Railway		B&O	1902	1915	Cincinnati, Indianapolis and Western Railroad	
Cincinnati Inter-Terminal Railroad		C&O	1902		Still exists as a nonoperating subsidiary of CSX Transportation	
Cincinnati, Jackson and Mackinaw Railroad		NYC	1886	1892	Cincinnati, Jackson and Mackinaw Railway	
Cincinnati, Jackson and Mackinaw Railway		NYC	1892	1897	Cincinnati Northern Railroad	
Cincinnati, Lebanon and Northern Railway		PRR	1885	1926	Pennsylvania, Ohio and Detroit Railroad	
Cincinnati, Lebanon and Xenia Railroad		PRR	1850	1869	Miami Valley Narrow Gauge Railway	
Cincinnati and Michigan Railroad		NYC	1891	1892	Cincinnati, Jackson and Mackinaw Railway	
Cincinnati and Muskingum Valley Railroad		PRR	1898	1911	Cleveland, Akron and Cincinnati Railway	
Cincinnati and Muskingum Valley Railway		PRR	1870	1898	Cincinnati and Muskingum Valley Railroad	
Cincinnati Northern Railroad	CNOR	NYC	1894	1938	Cleveland, Cincinnati, Chicago and St. Louis Railway	
Cincinnati Northern Railway		PRR	1880	1883	Toledo, Cincinnati and St. Louis Railroad	
Cincinnati Northwestern Railway						
Cincinnati and Portsmouth Railroad						
Cincinnati, Portsmouth and Parkersburg Railway		B&O	1899	1899	Baltimore and Ohio Southwestern Railroad	
Cincinnati, Portsmouth and Virginia Railroad		N&W	1891	1901	Norfolk and Western Railway	
Cincinnati Railway Tunnel Company		PRR	1872	1896	Cincinnati, Lebanon and Northern Railway	
Cincinnati and Richmond Railroad		PRR	1881	1890	Pittsburgh, Cincinnati, Chicago and St. Louis Railway	
Cincinnati, Richmond and Chicago Railroad		PRR	1866	1890	Cincinnati and Richmond Railroad	
Cincinnati, Sandusky and Cleveland Railroad		NYC	1868	1938	Cleveland, Cincinnati, Chicago and St. Louis Railway	
Cincinnati Southern Railway		SOU	1869			Still exists as a lessor of Norfolk Southern Railway operating subsidiary Cincinnati, New Orleans and Texas Pacific Railway
Cincinnati and Springfield Railway		NYC	1870	1912	Cleveland, Cincinnati, Chicago and St. Louis Railway	
Cincinnati Terminal Railway	CTER		1994	1997	Indiana and Ohio Railway	
Cincinnati, Van Wert and Michigan Railroad		NYC	1881	1886	Cincinnati, Jackson and Mackinaw Railroad	
Cincinnati, Washington and Baltimore Railroad		B&O	1883	1889	Baltimore and Ohio Southwestern Railroad	
Cincinnati and Westwood Railroad						
Cincinnati, Wheeling and New York Railroad		B&O	1883	1891	Eastern Ohio Railroad	
Cincinnati, Wilmington and Zanesville Railroad		PRR	1851	1863	Cincinnati and Zanesville Railroad	
Cincinnati and Zanesville Railroad		PRR	1864	1869	Cincinnati and Muskingum Valley Railway	
Cleveland, Akron and Cincinnati Railway		PRR	1911	1926	Pennsylvania, Ohio and Detroit Railroad	
Cleveland, Akron and Columbus Railroad		PRR	1881	1882	Cleveland, Akron and Columbus Railway	
Cleveland, Akron and Columbus Railway		PRR	1885	1911	Cleveland, Akron and Cincinnati Railway	
Cleveland, Barberton and Western Railroad		ACY/ B&O/ ERIE/ PRR	1899	1902	Akron and Barberton Belt Railroad	
Cleveland Belt Line Railroad		W&LE	1890	1891	Cleveland Belt and Terminal Railroad	
Cleveland Belt and Terminal Railroad		W&LE	1891	1899	Wheeling and Lake Erie Railroad	
Cleveland and Canton Railroad		W&LE	1885	1892	Cleveland, Canton and Southern Railroad	
Cleveland and Newburgh Railway			1834	1840		A streetcar line, also named Cleveland and Newburgh Railway, operated from 1868 to 1878.
Cleveland, Canton, Coshocton and Straitsville Railway		W&LE	1877	1881	Connotton Valley and Straitsville Railroad	
Cleveland, Canton and Southern Railroad		W&LE	1890	1899	Chagrin Falls and Lake Erie Railroad, Wheeling and Lake Erie Railroad	
Cleveland, Chagrin Falls and Northern Railroad		W&LE	1888	1891	Cleveland and Canton Railroad	
Cleveland, Cincinnati, Chicago and St. Louis Railway		NYC	1889	1976	Consolidated Rail Corporation	
Cleveland, Columbus and Cincinnati Railroad		NYC	1836	1868	Cleveland, Columbus, Cincinnati and Indianapolis Railway	
Cleveland, Columbus, Cincinnati and Indianapolis Railway		NYC	1868	1889	Cleveland, Cincinnati, Chicago and St. Louis Railway	
Cleveland, Delphos and St. Louis Railroad		ACY	1881	1885	Cleveland and Western Railroad	
Cleveland, Fort Wayne and Chicago Railroad		NKP	1865	1879	Ohio Railway	
Cleveland, Lorain and Wheeling Railroad		B&O	1883	1893	Cleveland, Lorain and Wheeling Railway	
Cleveland, Lorain and Wheeling Railway		B&O	1893	1915	Baltimore and Ohio Railroad	
Cleveland and Mahoning Railroad		ERIE	1848	1872	Cleveland and Mahoning Valley Railroad	
Cleveland and Mahoning Railway		PRR	1886	1911	Toledo, Columbus and Ohio River Railroad	
Cleveland and Mahoning Valley Railroad		ERIE	1872	1941	Erie Railroad	
Cleveland and Marietta Railroad		PRR	1879	1886	Cleveland and Marietta Railway	
Cleveland and Marietta Railway		PRR	1886	1911	Toledo, Columbus and Ohio River Railroad	
Cleveland, Medina and Tuscarawas Railroad		B&O	1853	1870	Lake Shore and Tuscarawas Valley Railway	
Cleveland, Mount Vernon and Delaware Railroad		PRR	1869	1881	Cleveland, Akron and Columbus Railroad	
Cleveland and New Castle Railway		PRR	1898	1899	Youngstown and Ravenna Railroad	
Cleveland, Painesville and Ashtabula Railroad		NYC	1848	1868	Lake Shore Railway	
Cleveland and Pittsburgh Railroad		PRR	1836	1976	Consolidated Rail Corporation	
Cleveland Short Line Railway		NYC	1902	1915	New York Central Railroad	
Cleveland and Southwestern Railway		B&O	1887	1893	Cleveland, Lorain and Wheeling Railway	
Cleveland and State Line Railroad		NKP	1887	1887	New York, Chicago and St. Louis Railroad	
Cleveland Terminal and Valley Railway		B&O	1895	1915	Baltimore and Ohio Railroad	
Cleveland and Toledo Railroad		NYC	1853	1869	Lake Shore Railway	
Cleveland, Toledo and Lakeside Railway			1885	1886	Lakeside and Marblehead Railroad	
Cleveland, Tuscarawas Valley and Wheeling Railway		B&O	1875	1883	Cleveland, Lorain and Wheeling Railroad	
Cleveland Union Terminals Company						
Cleveland and Western Railroad		ACY	1884	1890	Pittsburgh, Akron and Western Railroad	
Cleveland and Wheeling Railroad		NYC	1887	1895	Wheeling and Cleveland Railroad	
Cleveland, Wooster and Muskingum Valley Railroad		B&O	1890	1915	Baltimore and Ohio Railroad	
Cleveland, Youngstown and Pittsburgh Railroad		NYC	1881	1882	Cleveland, Youngstown and Pittsburgh Railway	
Cleveland, Youngstown and Pittsburgh Railway		NYC	1882	1886	Lake Erie, Alliance and Southern Railway	
Cleveland, Zanesville and Cincinnati Railroad		PRR	1853	1864	Pittsburgh, Fort Wayne and Chicago Railway	
College Hill Railroad						
Columbus, Chicago and Indiana Central Railway		PRR	1868	1883	Chicago, St. Louis and Pittsburgh Railroad	
Columbus and Cincinnati Railroad		B&O	1882	1882	Columbus and Cincinnati Midland Railroad	
Columbus and Cincinnati Midland Railroad		B&O	1882	1915	Baltimore and Ohio Railroad	
Columbus Connecting and Terminal Railroad		N&W	1892	1913	Norfolk and Western Railway	
Columbus and Eastern Railroad		NYC	1882	1890	Columbus and Lake Michigan Railroad	
Columbus, Shawnee and Hocking Railway
Columbus, Findlay and Northern Railroad		B&O	1887	1943	Toledo and Cincinnati Railroad	
Columbus and Gallipolis Railway		C&O	1876	1878	Ohio and West Virginia Railway	
Columbus and Hocking Valley Railroad		C&O	1867	1881	Columbus, Hocking Valley and Toledo Railway	
Columbus, Hocking Valley and Toledo Railway		C&O	1881	1899	Hocking Valley Railway	
Columbus and Indiana Central Railway		PRR	1867	1868	Columbus, Chicago and Indiana Central Railway	
Columbus and Indianapolis Railroad		PRR	1863	1864	Columbus and Indianapolis Central Railway	
Columbus and Indianapolis Central Railway		PRR	1864	1867	Columbus and Indiana Central Railway	
Columbus and Lake Erie Railroad		B&O	1845	1854	Sandusky, Mansfield and Newark Railroad	
Columbus and Lake Michigan Railroad			1890	1898		
Columbus, Lancaster and Wellston Railway						
Columbus and Maysville Railroad		N&W	1881	1901	Cincinnati, Portsmouth and Virginia Railroad	
Columbus and Maysville Railroad, Southern Division		N&W	1877	1881	Columbus and Maysville Railroad	
Columbus Northwestern Railway		DT&I, NYC	1897	1898	Detroit and Lima Northern Railway	
Columbus, Piqua and Indiana Railroad		PRR	1849	1863	Columbus and Indianapolis Railroad	
Columbus, Sandusky and Hocking Railroad		NYC, PRR	1895	1902	Toledo, Walhonding Valley and Ohio Railroad, Zanesville and Western Railway	
Columbus, Sandusky and Hocking Railway		NYC, PRR	1893	1895	Columbus, Sandusky and Hocking Railroad	
Columbus, Shawnee and Hocking Railway		NYC	1889	1893	Columbus, Sandusky and Hocking Railway	
Columbus and Southern Railway						
Columbus, Springfield and Cincinnati Railroad		NYC	1869	1912	Cleveland, Cincinnati, Chicago and St. Louis Railway	
Columbus and Sunday Creek Valley Railroad		NYC	1878	1879	Ohio Central Railroad	
Columbus Terminal and Transfer Railroad		N&W	1893	1905	Norfolk and Western Railway	
Columbus, Tiffin and Toledo Railroad		PRR	1867	1870	Baltimore and Ohio, Toledo and Michigan Railroad	
Columbus and Toledo Railroad		C&O	1872	1881	Columbus, Hocking Valley and Toledo Railway	
Columbus, Washington and Cincinnati Railroad		DT&I	1877	1879	Cincinnati, Columbus and Hocking Valley Railway	
Columbus, Wellston and Southern Railroad			1899			
Columbus and Xenia Railroad		PRR	1844	1943	Little Miami Railroad	
Conneaut Terminal Railroad		B&LE	1892	1893	Pittsburgh, Shenango and Lake Erie Railroad	
Connecting Railway		PRR	1956	1976	Consolidated Rail Corporation	
Connotton Northern Railway		W&LE	1880	1880	Connotton Valley Railway	
Connotton Valley Railroad		W&LE	1879	1880	Connotton Valley Railway	
Connotton Valley Railway	CVRI		2002	2004	Cleveland Commercial Railroad	
Connotton Valley Railway		W&LE	1880	1885	Cleveland and Canton Railroad	
Connotton Valley and Straitsville Railroad		W&LE	1881	1882	Connotton Valley Railway	
Consolidated Rail Corporation	CR		1976	1999	CSX Transportation, Norfolk Southern Railway	
Coshocton, Otsego and Eastern Railroad		W&LE	1909	1917	Wheeling and Lake Erie Railway	
Coshocton and Southern Railroad		W&LE	1885	1891	Cleveland, Canton and Southern Railroad	
Coshocton, Wooster and Cleveland Railroad		B&O	1851	1853	Cleveland, Medina and Tuscarawas Railroad	
Covington and Cincinnati Elevated Railroad and Transfer and Bridge Company		C&O	1886	1985	Chesapeake and Ohio Railway	
Culver and Port Clinton Railroad						
Cuyahoga Valley Railway	CUVA		1905	2002	Cleveland Works Railway	
Dayton and Chicago Railway		B&O	1886	1887	Dayton, Fort Wayne and Chicago Railway	
Dayton and Cincinnati Railroad		PRR	1849	1872	Cincinnati Railway Tunnel Company	
Dayton and Cincinnati Terminal Railroad		NYC	1894	1894	Cincinnati Northern Railroad	
Dayton, Covington and Toledo Railroad		B&O	1877	1880	Toledo, Delphos and Burlington Railroad	
Dayton, Fort Wayne and Chicago Railway		B&O	1887	1891	Cincinnati, Dayton and Chicago Railroad, Cincinnati, Dayton and Ironton Railroad	
Dayton, Hocking Valley and Eastern Railway		C&O	1890	1900	Hocking Valley Railway	
Dayton and Ironton Railroad		B&O	1884	1887	Dayton, Fort Wayne and Chicago Railway	
Dayton, Lebanon and Cincinnati Railroad		PRR	1889	1907	Dayton, Lebanon and Cincinnati Railroad and Terminal Company	
Dayton, Lebanon and Cincinnati Railroad and Terminal Company		PRR	1907	1915	Cincinnati, Lebanon and Northern Railway	
Dayton, Lebanon and Deerfield Railroad		PRR	1847	1848	Dayton, Springboro, Lebanon and Cincinnati Railroad	
Dayton and Michigan Railroad		B&O	1851			Still exists as a nonoperating subsidiary of CSX Transportation
Dayton Northern Railway		DT&I	1895	1898	Detroit and Lima Northern Railway	
Dayton and Northern Railway		B&O	1886	1886	Dayton and Chicago Railway	
Dayton and South Eastern Railroad		B&O	1871	1881	Toledo, Delphos and Burlington Railroad	
Dayton, Springboro, Lebanon and Cincinnati Railroad		PRR	1848	1849	Dayton and Cincinnati Railroad	
Dayton and Toledo Railroad		B&O	1885	1886	Dayton and Northern Railway	
Dayton, Toledo and Chicago Railway						
Dayton Union Railway		B&O/ NYC/ PRR	1892	1976	Consolidated Rail Corporation	
Dayton and Union Railroad		B&O	1863	1989	CSX Transportation	
Dayton and Western Railroad		PRR	1846	1943	Little Miami Railroad	
Dayton, Xenia and Belpre Railroad		PRR	1851	1865	Columbus and Xenia Railroad, Little Miami Railroad	
Delphos and Kokomo Railroad		NKP	1877	1879	Toledo, Delphos and Burlington Railroad	
Detroit, Butler and St. Louis Railroad		WAB	1881	1881	Wabash, St. Louis and Pacific Railway	
Detroit and Chicago Railroad		NYC	1888	1914	New York Central Railroad	
Detroit and Lima Northern Railway		DT&I, NYC	1897	1901	Detroit Southern Railroad, Toledo and Ohio Central Railway	
Detroit Southern Railroad		DT&I	1901	1905	Detroit, Toledo and Ironton Railway	
Detroit and State Line Wabash Railroad		WAB	1889	1889	Wabash Railroad	
Detroit, Toledo and Ironton Railroad	DT&I, DTI	DT&I	1914	1983	Grand Trunk Western Railroad	
Detroit, Toledo and Ironton Railway		DT&I	1905	1913	Detroit, Toledo and Ironton Railroad	
Detroit and Toledo Shore Line Railroad	D&TS, DTS	CN/ NKP	1899	1981	Grand Trunk Western Railroad	
Eastern Ohio Railroad		B&O	1891	1915	Baltimore and Ohio Railroad	
Eastern Ohio Railroad		B&O	1871	1882	Wheeling and Cincinnati Mineral Railway	
Eaton and Hamilton Railroad		PRR	1847	1866	Cincinnati, Richmond and Chicago Railroad	
Elyria and Black River Railway		B&O	1871	1872	Lake Shore and Tuscarawas Valley Railway	
Erie Railroad	ERIE	ERIE	1895	1960	Erie–Lackawanna Railroad	
Erie and Kalamazoo Railroad		NYC	1833	1976	Consolidated Rail Corporation	
Erie–Lackawanna Railroad	EL		1960	1968	Erie Lackawanna Railway	
Erie Lackawanna Railway	EL		1968	1976	Consolidated Rail Corporation	
Euclid Railroad			1883	1967	N/A	
Fairport, Painesville and Eastern Railroad	FP&E, FPE	N&W	1910	1984	Norfolk and Western Railway	
Federal Valley Railroad		NYC	1918	1952	New York Central Railroad	
Felicity and Bethel Railroad						
Findlay Belt Railway		NYC	1887	1932	N/A	
Findlay, Fort Wayne and Western Railroad			1890	1894	Ohio Railway	
Findlay, Fort Wayne and Western Railway			1894	1903	Cincinnati, Findlay and Fort Wayne Railway	
Findlay and Western Railroad			1890	1890	Findlay, Fort Wayne and Western Railroad	
Flint and Pere Marquette Railroad		PM	1897	1899	Pere Marquette Railroad	
Franklin and Ohio River Railroad						
Franklin and Warren Railroad		ERIE	1851	1853	Atlantic and Great Western Railroad	
Fremont and Indiana Railroad		NKP	1853	1861	Fremont, Lima and Union Railroad	
Fremont, Lima and Union Railroad		NKP	1862	1865	Lake Erie and Louisville Railroad	
Fremont, Lima and Union Railway		NKP	1871	1872	Lake Erie and Louisville Railway	
Gallipolis, McArthur and Columbus Railroad		C&O	1870	1877	Columbus and Gallipolis Railway	
Grafton and Brunswick Railroad						
Great Miami and Scioto Railway	GMRY		1994	2004	U S Rail Corporation	
Greenville and Miami Railroad		B&O	1846	1862	Dayton and Union Railroad	
Hamilton Belt Railway		B&O	1896	1944	Baltimore and Ohio Railroad	
Harrison Branch Company		NYC	1864	1871	Harrison Branch Railroad	
Harrison Branch Railroad		NYC	1871	1912	Cleveland, Cincinnati, Chicago and St. Louis Railway	
Harrison, Jefferson and Belmont Railway		W&LE	1887	1888	Jefferson and Columbiana Railway	
Hillsboro Railroad		N&W	1895	1902	Norfolk and Western Railway	
Hillsborough and Cincinnati Railroad		B&O	1846	1860	Marietta and Cincinnati Railroad	
Hillsboro Short Line Railway		N&W	1879	1902	Norfolk and Western Railway	
Hillsdale County Railroad			1986	1992	Indiana Northeastern Railroad	
Hocking Valley Railway	HV	C&O	1899	1930	Chesapeake and Ohio Railway	
Holliday's Cove Railroad		PRR	1860	1868	Pittsburgh, Cincinnati and St. Louis Railway	
Home Avenue Railroad		B&O	1871			Still exists as a nonoperating subsidiary of CSX Transportation
Huron and Oxford Railroad		B&O	1846	1854	Sandusky, Mansfield and Newark Railroad	
Indiana, Bloomington and Western Railway		NYC	1881	1887	Springfield and Western Railway	
Indiana Hi-Rail Corporation	IHRC		1980	1997	Delphos Terminal Company, Maumee and Western Railroad	
Indiana and Ohio Railroad	INOH		1979	1997	Indiana and Ohio Railway	
Indiana and Ohio Central Railroad	IOCR		1987	2005	Indiana and Ohio Railway	
Indiana and Ohio Eastern Railroad			1987	1994	Great Miami and Scioto Railway	
Indianapolis and Cincinnati Railroad		NYC	1866	1867	Indianapolis, Cincinnati and La Fayette Railway	
Indianapolis, Cincinnati and La Fayette Railroad		NYC	1873	1880	Cincinnati, Indianapolis, St. Louis and Chicago Railway	
Indianapolis, Cincinnati and La Fayette Railway		NYC	1867	1873	Indianapolis, Cincinnati and La Fayette Railroad	
Industrial Railroad		ERIE/ PRR	1903	1910	Lorain, Ashland and Southern Railroad	
Iron Railroad		DT&I	1849	1881	Toledo, Delphos and Burlington Railroad	
Iron Railway		DT&I	1884	1902	Detroit Southern Railroad	
Island Creek and Richmond Mineral Railroad		NYC	1877	1881	Steubenville, Canton and Cleveland Railway	
Ivorydale and Mill Creek Valley Railway						
Jefferson and Columbiana Railway		W&LE	1888	1888	Wheeling and Lake Erie Railway	
Junction Railroad		B&O	1849	1878	Cincinnati, Hamilton and Indianapolis Railroad	
Junction Railroad		NYC	1846	1853	Cleveland and Toledo Railroad	
Junction Railway		NYC	1872	1872	Toledo, Canada Southern and Detroit Railway	
Kanawha and Michigan Railway	K&M	NYC	1890	1938	Toledo and Ohio Central Railway	
Kanawha and Ohio Railway		NYC	1886	1890	Kanawha and Michigan Railway	
Lake Erie, Alliance and Southern Railway		NYC	1887	1893	Alliance and Northern Railroad, Ohio River and Lake Erie Railroad	
Lake Erie, Alliance and Wheeling Railroad		NYC	1901	1952	New York Central Railroad	
Lake Erie, Alliance and Wheeling Railroad		NYC	1874	1878	Alliance and Lake Erie Railroad	
Lake Erie and Eastern Railroad	LEE	PLE	1904	1984	Pittsburgh and Lake Erie Railroad	
Lake Erie and Louisville Railroad		NKP	1877	1879	Lake Erie and Western Railway	
Lake Erie and Louisville Railroad		NKP	1865	1871	Fremont, Lima and Union Railway	
Lake Erie and Louisville Railway		NKP	1872	1877	Lake Erie and Louisville Railroad	
Lake Erie and Pittsburgh Railway		NYC/ PRR	1903	1970	Penn Central Transportation Company	
Lake Erie and Western Railroad		NKP	1887	1923	New York, Chicago and St. Louis Railroad	
Lake Erie and Western Railway		NKP	1879	1886	Lake Erie and Western Railroad	
Lake Erie, Wooster and Muskingum Valley Railroad		B&O	1881	1891	Cleveland, Wooster and Muskingum Valley Railroad	
Lake Erie, Youngstown and Southern Railroad		PLE	1902	1912	Lake Erie and Eastern Railroad	
Lake and River Railway		ACY, ERIE/ PRR	1903	1907	Ashland and Western Railroad, Akron, Canton and Youngstown Railway	
Lake Shore Railway		NYC	1868	1869	Lake Shore and Michigan Southern Railway	
Lake Shore and Michigan Southern Railway		NYC	1869	1914	New York Central Railroad	
Lake Shore and Tuscarawas Valley Railway		B&O	1870	1875	Cleveland, Tuscarawas Valley and Wheeling Railway	
Lake View and Collamer Railroad			1875	1882	New York, Chicago and St. Louis Railroad	Operated as Cleveland, Painesville and Ashtabula Railroad from 1879 to 1882
Lakeside and Marblehead Railroad			1886	1964	N/A	
Lancaster and Hamden Railway						
Lawrence Railroad		PRR	1865	1887	Youngstown, Lawrence and Pittsburgh Railroad	
Lawrence Railroad and Transportation Company		PRR	1864	1865	Lawrence Railroad	
Liberty and Vienna Railroad		ERIE	1868	1872	Cleveland and Mahoning Valley Railway	
Lima Belt Railway		B&O	1900	1944	Baltimore and Ohio Railroad	
Lima Northern Railway		DT&I	1895	1897	Detroit and Lima Northern Railway	
Little Miami Railroad		PRR	1836	1976	Consolidated Rail Corporation	
Lorain and Ashland Railroad		ERIE/ PRR	1905	1910	Lorain, Ashland and Southern Railroad	
Lorain, Ashland and Southern Railroad	LA&S	ERIE/ PRR	1910	1925	N/A	
Lorain and Southern Railroad			1903	1952	N/A	
Lorain and West Virginia Railway	LAWV	W&LE	1906	1983	N/A	
Louisville, Cincinnati and Dayton Railway		B&O	1886	1888	Cincinnati and Dayton Railway	
Louisville, Cincinnati and Lexington Railroad		L&N	1872	1877	Louisville, Cincinnati and Lexington Railway	
Louisville, Cincinnati and Lexington Railway		L&N	1877	1881	Louisville and Nashville Railroad	
Louisville and Nashville Railroad	L&N, LN	L&N	1881	1983	Seaboard System Railroad	
Mad River and Lake Erie Railroad		NYC	1832	1858	Sandusky, Dayton and Cincinnati Railroad	
Mahoning Coal Railroad		NYC	1871	1976	Consolidated Rail Corporation	
Mahoning and Shenango Valley Railway		NYC	1886	1976	Consolidated Rail Corporation	
Mahoning State Line Railroad		PLE	1891			Still exists as a nonoperating subsidiary of CSX Transportation
Mahoning Valley Western Railway		B&O	1902	1915	Baltimore and Ohio Railroad	
Mansfield, Coldwater and Lake Michigan Railroad		PRR	1871	1877	Northwestern Ohio Railway	
Mansfield, Coldwater and Lake Michigan Railway		PRR	1870	1871	Mansfield, Coldwater and Lake Michigan Railroad	
Mansfield and New Haven Railroad		B&O	1836	1843	Mansfield and Sandusky City Railroad	
Mansfield and Sandusky City Railroad		B&O	1843	1854	Sandusky, Mansfield and Newark Railroad	
Manufacturers Railway		PRR	1894	1926	Pennsylvania, Ohio and Detroit Railroad	
Marietta Railway		B&O	1896	1900	Baltimore and Ohio Southwestern Railroad	
Marietta and Cincinnati Railroad		B&O	1851	1882	Cincinnati, Washington and Baltimore Railroad	
Marietta, Columbus and Cleveland Railroad			1900	1916	Federal Valley Railroad, Marietta and Vincent Railroad	
Marietta, Columbus and Northern Railroad						
Marietta, Hocking and Northern Railway						
Marietta and Pittsburgh Railroad		PRR	1868	1873	Marietta, Pittsburg and Cleveland Railway	
Marietta, Pittsburg and Cleveland Railway		PRR	1873	1877	Cleveland and Marietta Railroad	
Marietta and Vincent Railroad			1900			
Martins Ferry Terminal Railroad		PRR	1888	1892	Wheeling Bridge and Terminal Railway	
Massillon Railroad		W&LE	1892	1904	Wheeling and Lake Erie Railroad	
Massillon Belt Railway			1909	1929	N/A	
Massillon and Cleveland Railroad		PRR	1868	1928	Pittsburgh, Fort Wayne and Chicago Railway	
Massillon and Coshocton Railway		W&LE	1874	1877	Cleveland, Canton, Coshocton and Straitsville Railway	
McComb, Deshler and Toledo Railroad		B&O	1879	1887	Columbus, Findlay and Northern Railroad	
Miami Valley Railway		PRR	1876	1880	Cincinnati Northern Railway	
Miami Valley Narrow Gauge Railway		PRR	1874	1876	Miami Valley Railway	
Michigan Central Railroad	MC	NYC	1883	1976	Consolidated Rail Corporation	
Michigan Interstate Railway			1977	1988	Ann Arbor Railroad	
Michigan and Ohio Railroad		NYC	1883	1887	Cincinnati, Jackson and Mackinaw Railroad	
Michigan Southern and Northern Indiana Railroad		NYC	1855	1869	Lake Shore and Michigan Southern Railway	
Middleport and Northeastern Railway		NYC	1913	1938	Toledo and Ohio Central Railway	
Middletown and Cincinnati Railroad		PRR	1894	1902	Cincinnati, Lebanon and Northern Railway	
Middletown and Cincinnati Railway		PRR	1890	1894	Middletown and Cincinnati Railroad	
Middletown and State Line Railroad		B&O	1886	1886	Louisville, Cincinnati and Dayton Railway	
Midway Railroad	MID		1963	1973	N/A	
Millersburgh, Jeromeville and Greenwich Railroad		ERIE/ PRR	1894	1897	Ashland and Wooster Railway	
Mineral Railroad		C&O	1864	1867	Columbus and Hocking Valley Railroad	
Monroe and Toledo Railway		PM	1893	1897	Flint and Pere Marquette Railroad	
Monroeville and Sandusky City Railroad		B&O	1835	1843	Sandusky, Mansfield and Newark Railroad	
Montpelier and Chicago Railroad		WAB	1889	1891	Wabash Railroad	
Morgan Run Railway						
Mount Gilead Short Line Railway		NYC	1879	1966	N/A	
Moxahala Valley Railway	MOXV		1983	1986	Ohio Southern Railroad	
Muskingum County Railway		PRR	1881	1893	Bellaire, Zanesville and Cincinnati Railway	
New Castle and Ohio River Railway						
New Lisbon Railway		ERIE	1864	1869	Niles and New Lisbon Railway	
New York Central Railroad	NYC	NYC	1914	1968	Penn Central Transportation Company	
New York and Chicago Railway of Ohio		NKP	1881	1881	New York, Chicago and St. Louis Railway	
New York, Chicago and St. Louis Railroad	NKP	NKP	1887	1964	Norfolk and Western Railway	
New York, Chicago and St. Louis Railway		NKP	1881	1887	Cleveland and State Line Railroad	
New York, Fort Wayne and Chicago Railroad		NKP	1880	1881	New York, Chicago and St. Louis Railway	
New York, Lake Erie and Western Railroad		ERIE	1883	1895	Erie Railroad	
New York, Mahoning and Western Railroad			1887	1889	American Midland Railway	
New York, Pennsylvania and Ohio Railroad		ERIE	1880	1896	Nypano Railroad	
New York, Pittsburgh and Chicago Railway		PLE/ PRR	1881	1885	Pittsburgh, Marion and Chicago Railway	
Newark, Somerset and Straitsville Railroad		B&O	1867	1900	Ohio Midland Railroad	
Newburgh and South Shore Railway	N&SS, NSS		1899	1986	Cuyahoga Valley Railway, Newburgh and South Shore Railroad	
Newport and Cincinnati Bridge Company		L&N	1868	1904	Louisville and Nashville Railroad	
Niles and New Lisbon Railway		ERIE	1869	1872	Cleveland and Mahoning Valley Railway	
Nimishillen and Tuscarawas Railway	NTRY		1990	2003	Republic N&T Railroad	
Norfolk and Western Railroad		N&W	1890	1896	Norfolk and Western Railway	
Norfolk and Western Railway	N&W, NW	N&W	1896	1998	Norfolk Southern Railway	
North-Eastern Ohio Railroad		B&LE	1888	1888	Pittsburgh, Shenango and Lake Erie Railroad	
North Western Ohio Railroad		WAB	1880	1880	Butler and Detroit Railroad	
North Western Ohio Railroad		NYC	1871	1871	Chicago and Canada Southern Railway	
Northern Indiana Railroad		NYC	1851	1855	Michigan Southern and Northern Indiana Railroad	
Northern Ohio Railway		ACY	1895	1944	Akron, Canton and Youngstown Railroad	
Northwestern Ohio Railway		PRR	1876	1891	Toledo, Walhonding Valley and Ohio Railroad	
Nypano Railroad		ERIE	1896	1941	Erie Railroad	
Oberlin and La Grange Railway						
Ohio Railroad		NYC	1836	1852	Junction Railroad	
Ohio Railway			1894	1894	Findlay, Fort Wayne and Western Railway	
Ohio Railway		ACY	1883	1887	Pittsburgh, Akron and Western Railway	
Ohio Railway		NKP	1879	1880	New York, Fort Wayne and Chicago Railroad	
Ohio Central Railroad		NYC	1879	1885	Ohio and Kanawha Railway, Toledo and Ohio Central Railway	
Ohio Central Railway		NYC	1876	1878	Columbus and Sunday Creek Valley Railroad, Ohio Central Railroad	
Ohio and Indiana Railroad		PRR	1850	1856	Pittsburgh, Fort Wayne and Chicago Railroad	
Ohio, Indiana and Missouri Railroad				1889	American Midland Railway	
Ohio, Indiana and Pacific Railway		NYC	1881	1881	Indiana, Bloomington and Western Railway	
Ohio and Indiana State Line Railroad		NYC	1880	1881	Ohio, Indiana and Pacific Railway	
Ohio, Indiana and Western Railway		NYC	1887	1890	Cleveland, Cincinnati, Chicago and St. Louis Railway	
Ohio and Kanawha Railway		NYC	1886	1886	Kanawha and Ohio Railway	
Ohio and Kentucky Bridge Company		C&O	1886	1886	Covington and Cincinnati Elevated Railroad and Transfer and Bridge Company	
Ohio and Little Kanawha Railroad		B&O	1900	1966	Baltimore and Ohio Railroad	
Ohio Midland Railroad		B&O	1900	1915	Baltimore and Ohio Railroad	
Ohio and Mississippi Railroad		B&O	1848	1867	Ohio and Mississippi Railway	
Ohio and Mississippi Railway		B&O	1867	1893	Baltimore and Ohio Southwestern Railway	
Ohio and Morenci Railroad			1933	1954	N/A	
Ohio and North Western Railroad		N&W	1886	1890	Cincinnati, Portsmouth and Virginia Railroad	
Ohio and Pennsylvania Railroad		PRR	1848	1856	Pittsburgh, Fort Wayne and Chicago Railroad	
Ohio and Pennsylvania Belt Line Railroad						
Ohio and Toledo Railroad		W&LE	1872	1878	Youngstown and Connotton Valley Railroad	
Ohio River Railway		N&W	1877	1890	Scioto Valley Railway	
Ohio River and Columbus Railway						
Ohio River and Lake Erie Railroad		NYC	1897	1901	Lake Erie, Alliance and Wheeling Railroad	
Ohio River and Western Railway		PRR	1902	1931	Pittsburgh, Ohio Valley and Cincinnati Railroad	
Ohio Southern Railroad		DT&I	1881	1898	Detroit Southern Railroad	
Ohio Valley Railway		PRR	1871	1890	Pittsburgh, Ohio Valley and Cincinnati Railroad	
Ohio Valley and Junction Railway		PRR	1897	1902	Cleveland and Mahoning Railway	
Ohio and West Virginia Railway		C&O	1878	1881	Columbus, Hocking Valley and Toledo Railway	
Painesville, Canton and Bridgeport Narrow Gauge Railroad		W&LE	1875	1880	Chagrin Falls and Southern Railroad	
Painesville and Hudson Railroad		B&O	1852	1870	Painesville and Youngstown Railroad	
Painesville, Wooster and Ohio Railway		B&O	1886	1890	Lake Erie, Wooster and Muskingum Valley Railroad	
Painesville and Youngstown Railroad		B&O	1870	1879	Painesville and Youngstown Railway	
Painesville and Youngstown Railway		B&O	1879	1886	Pittsburg, Painesville and Fairport Railway	
Paulding and Cecil Railway		NYC	1879	1887	Cincinnati, Jackson and Mackinaw Railroad	
Penn Central Transportation Company	PC		1968	1976	Consolidated Rail Corporation	
Penndel Company		PRR	1954	1976	Consolidated Rail Corporation	
Pennsylvania Company		PRR	1871	1918	Pennsylvania Railroad	
Pennsylvania Railroad	PRR	PRR	1918	1968	Penn Central Transportation Company	
Pennsylvania, Ohio and Detroit Railroad		PRR	1926	1956	Connecting Railway	
Peoria and Eastern Railway	PAE	NYC	1890	1914	Cleveland, Cincinnati, Chicago and St. Louis Railway	
Pere Marquette Railroad		PM	1899	1917	Pere Marquette Railway	
Pere Marquette Railway	PM	PM	1917	1947	Chesapeake and Ohio Railway	
Philadelphia, Baltimore and Washington Railroad		PRR	1956	1976	Consolidated Rail Corporation	
Pioneer and Fayette Railroad	PF		1933	1992	N/A	
Piqua and Troy Branch Railroad		B&O	1881	1943	Toledo and Cincinnati Railroad	
Pittsburgh, Akron and Western Railroad		ACY	1890	1894	Northern Ohio Railway	
Pittsburgh, Akron and Western Railway		ACY	1887	1890	Pittsburgh, Akron and Western Railroad	
Pittsburg, Bessemer and Lake Erie Railroad		B&LE	1897	1949	Bessemer and Lake Erie Railroad	
Pittsburgh and Chicago Railroad		ACY	1882	1887	Cleveland and Western Railroad	
Pittsburgh, Cincinnati, Chicago and St. Louis Railroad		PRR	1917	1956	Philadelphia, Baltimore and Washington Railroad	
Pittsburgh, Cincinnati, Chicago and St. Louis Railway		PRR	1890	1917	Pittsburgh, Cincinnati, Chicago and St. Louis Railroad	
Pittsburgh, Cincinnati and St. Louis Railway		PRR	1868	1890	Pittsburgh, Cincinnati, Chicago and St. Louis Railway	
Pittsburg, Cleveland and Toledo Railroad		B&O	1882	1915	Baltimore and Ohio Railroad	
Pittsburgh, Fort Wayne and Chicago Railroad		PRR	1856	1861	Pittsburgh, Fort Wayne and Chicago Railway	
Pittsburgh, Fort Wayne and Chicago Railway		PRR	1862	1976	Consolidated Rail Corporation	
Pittsburgh and Lake Erie Railroad	PLE	PLE	1878	1992	Three Rivers Railway	
Pittsburgh, Lisbon and Western Railroad	PL&W, PLW	PLE/ PRR	1902	1945	Youngstown and Southern Railway	
Pittsburgh, Lisbon and Western Railway		PLE/ PRR	1896	1902	Pittsburgh, Lisbon and Western Railroad	
Pittsburgh, Marion and Chicago Railway		PLE/ PRR	1885	1896	Pittsburgh, Lisbon and Western Railway	
Pittsburg, Maysville and Cincinnati Railroad		B&O	1853	1865	South Western Railroad	
Pittsburgh, Mount Vernon, Columbus and London Railroad		PRR	1869	1869	Cleveland, Mount Vernon and Delaware Railroad	
Pittsburgh, New Castle and Lake Erie Railroad		B&O	1877	1881	Pittsburgh and Western Railroad	
Pittsburgh and Northwestern Railroad		B&O	1875	1877	Pittsburgh, New Castle and Lake Erie Railroad	
Pittsburgh, Ohio Valley and Cincinnati Railroad		PRR	1890	1954	Penndel Company	
Pittsburg, Painesville and Fairport Railway		B&O	1886	1915	Baltimore and Ohio Railroad	
Pittsburgh, Shenango and Lake Erie Railroad		B&LE	1888	1897	Pittsburg, Bessemer and Lake Erie Railroad	
Pittsburgh, Toledo and Western Railroad		P&WV	1901	1904	Wabash Pittsburgh Terminal Railway	
Pittsburgh and West Virginia Railroad			1967			Still exists as a lessor of the Wheeling and Lake Erie Railway
Pittsburgh and West Virginia Railway	P&WV	P&WV	1917	1967	Pittsburgh and West Virginia Railroad	
Pittsburgh and Western Railroad		B&O	1881	1887	Pittsburgh and Western Railway	
Pittsburgh and Western Railway		B&O	1887	1902	N/A	Only entered Ohio through leases of other companies
Pittsburgh, Youngstown and Ashtabula Railroad		PRR	1887	1906	Pittsburgh, Youngstown and Ashtabula Railway	
Pittsburgh, Youngstown and Ashtabula Railway		PRR	1906	1976	Consolidated Rail Corporation	
Pittsburg, Youngstown and Chicago Railroad		B&O	1881	1882	Pittsburg, Cleveland and Toledo Railroad	
Pleasant Bay Railway		CN/ NKP	1899	1899	Detroit and Toledo Shore Line Railroad	
PL&W Railroad	PLW		1993	1995	Ohio and Pennsylvania Railroad	
Point Pleasant Bridge Company		NYC	1886	1935	Kanawha and Michigan Railway	
Point Pleasant and Ohio River Railroad		NYC	1883	1885	Kanawha and Ohio Railway, Point Pleasant Bridge Company	
Pomeroy Belt Railway		C&O	1909	1930	Chesapeake and Ohio Railway	
Pomeroy and Ohio River Railroad		NYC	1881	1883	Point Pleasant and Ohio River Railroad	
Port Clinton Railroad		NYC	1852	1853	Cleveland and Toledo Railroad	
Railroad Ventures, Inc.			1996	2001	Columbiana County Port Authority	
Richland and Mahoning Railway		ACY	1898	1903	Lake and River Railway	
Richmond and Covington Railroad		PRR	1862	1864	Columbus and Indianapolis Railroad	
River Terminal Railway	RT		1909	2002	Cleveland Works Railway	
Rocky River Railroad		NKP	1867	1881	New York, Chicago and St. Louis Railroad	
Rolling Mill Railroad		PRR	1883	1904	Toledo, Walhonding Valley and Ohio Railroad	
St. Clairsville Railway		B&O	1880	1885	Bellaire and St. Clairsville Railway	
St. Clairsville and Northern Railway		B&O	1879	1945	N/A	
St. Joseph Valley Railway						
Salem Railroad		PLE/ PRR	1881	1902	Pittsburgh, Lisbon and Western Railroad	
Sandusky and Cincinnati Railroad		NYC	1866	1868	Cincinnati, Sandusky and Cleveland Railroad	
Sandusky City and Indiana Railroad		NYC	1851	1866	Sandusky and Cincinnati Railroad	
Sandusky and Columbus, Lake Erie and Southern Short Line Railway		PRR	1889	1891	Sandusky and Columbus Short Line Railway	
Sandusky and Columbus Short Line Railway		PRR	1891	1893	Columbus, Sandusky and Hocking Railway	
Sandusky, Dayton and Cincinnati Railroad		NYC	1858	1866	Sandusky and Cincinnati Railroad	
Sandusky and Fremont Railway		NKP	1880	1880	Lake Erie and Western Railway	
Sandusky, Mansfield and Newark Railroad		B&O	1854	1915	Baltimore and Ohio Railroad	
Sandyville and Waynesburg Railroad		B&O	1898	1914	Cleveland Terminal and Valley Railway	
Scioto and Hocking Valley Railroad		B&O	1849	1863	Marietta and Cincinnati Railroad, Newark, Somerset and Straitsville Railroad	
Scioto Valley Railway		N&W	1875	1890	Scioto Valley and New England Railroad	
Scioto Valley and New England Railroad		N&W	1890	1890	Norfolk and Western Railroad	
Seaboard System Railroad	SBD		1983	1986	CSX Transportation	
Sharon Railroad		B&O	1849	1853	Pittsburg, Maysville and Cincinnati Railroad	
Silica Northern Railway			1912	1913	Toledo, Angola and Western Railway	
South Park and Royalton Railroad		B&O	1898	1916	Baltimore and Ohio Railroad	
South Pennsylvania and Ohio Railway		NYC	1883	1888	Cleveland and Wheeling Railroad	
South Western Railroad		B&O	1865	1871	Eastern Ohio Railroad	
Spring Grove, Avondale and Cincinnati Railway			1881	1883	Toledo, Cincinnati and St. Louis Railroad	
Springfield and Columbus Railroad		NYC	1849	1868	Columbus, Springfield and Cincinnati Railroad	
Springfield, Jackson and Pomeroy Railroad		DT&I	1874	1879	Springfield Southern Railroad	
Springfield and Mansfield Railroad		NYC, PRR	1850	1852	Springfield, Mount Vernon and Pittsburgh Railroad	
Springfield, Mount Vernon and Pittsburgh Railroad		NYC, PRR	1852	1867	Cleveland, Columbus and Cincinnati Railroad, Pittsburgh, Mount Vernon, Columbus and London Railroad	
Springfield Southern Railroad		DT&I	1879	1881	Ohio Southern Railroad	
Springfield and Western Railway		NYC	1887	1887	Ohio, Indiana and Western Railway	
Sterling Belt Line Railway	SBLN		1984		N/A	
Steubenville, Canton and Cleveland Railway		NYC	1881	1882	Cleveland, Youngstown and Pittsburgh Railway	
Steubenville and Indiana Railroad		PRR	1848	1868	Pittsburgh, Cincinnati and St. Louis Railway	
Sugar Creek and Northern Railroad		W&LE			Wheeling and Lake Erie Railway	
Sunday Creek Railroad		B&O	1901	1930	N/A	
Swan Creek Railway of Toledo		NYC	1875	1914	New York Central Railroad	
Tiffin and Fort Wayne Railroad		NKP	1854	1859	American Central Railway	
Toledo, Angola and Western Railway	TA&W, TAW		1902	1981	N/A	
Toledo and Ann Arbor Railroad		AA	1878	1880	Toledo, Ann Arbor and Grand Trunk Railway	
Toledo, Ann Arbor and Detroit Railroad		DT&I	1904	1912	Toledo, Ann Arbor and Jackson Railroad	
Toledo, Ann Arbor and Grand Trunk Railway		AA	1880	1884	Toledo, Ann Arbor and North Michigan Railway	
Toledo, Ann Arbor and Jackson Railroad		DT&I	1911	1915	Toledo–Detroit Railroad	
Toledo, Ann Arbor and North Michigan Railway		AA	1884	1895	Ann Arbor Railroad	
Toledo Belt Railway		W&LE	1883	1996	Norfolk and Western Railway	
Toledo, Canada Southern and Detroit Railway		NYC	1872	1916	Michigan Central Railroad	
Toledo and Chicago Railroad		WAB	1901	1901	Wabash Railroad	
Toledo and Cincinnati Railroad		B&O	1917	1944	Baltimore and Ohio Railroad	
Toledo, Cincinnati and St. Louis Railroad		B&O, DT&I, NKP, PRR	1882	1885	Cincinnati, Lebanon and Northern Railway, Dayton and Ironton Railroad, Dayton, Lebanon and Cincinnati Railroad, Dayton and Toledo Railroad, Iron Railway, Toledo, Dupont and Western Railway	
Toledo, Columbus and Cincinnati Railway		NYC	1889	1892	Toledo and Ohio Central Railway	
Toledo, Columbus and Ohio River Railroad		PRR	1911	1926	Pennsylvania, Ohio and Detroit Railroad	
Toledo, Columbus and Southern Railway		NYC	1885	1888	Toledo, Columbus and Cincinnati Railway	
Toledo, Delphos and Burlington Railroad		B&O, DT&I, NKP	1879	1882	Toledo, Cincinnati and St. Louis Railroad	
Toledo, Delphos and Indianapolis Railway		B&O, NKP	1872	1879	Toledo, Delphos and Burlington Railroad	
Toledo–Detroit Railroad		DT&I	1915	1931	Detroit, Toledo and Ironton Railroad	
Toledo Dock and Warehouse Company		PRR	1898	1903	Manufacturers Railway	
Toledo, Dupont and Western Railway		NKP	1886	1886	Toledo, St. Louis and Kansas City Railroad	
Toledo, Findlay and Springfield Railway		B&O	1889	1890	Bowling Green Railroad	
Toledo and Grand Rapids Railroad		NKP	1874	1881	Toledo, Delphos and Burlington Railroad	
Toledo and Illinois Railroad		WAB	1853	1856	Toledo, Wabash and Western Railroad	
Toledo and Indianapolis Railway		NYC	1881	1885	Toledo, Columbus and Southern Railway	
Toledo and Maumee Narrow Gauge Railroad		NKP	1873	1879	Toledo, Delphos and Burlington Railroad	
Toledo and Michigan Railway		NYC	1882	1883	Michigan and Ohio Railroad	
Toledo and Michigan Belt Railway		NYC	1887	1897	Toledo, Canada Southern and Detroit Railway	
Toledo and Michigan Terminal Railroad		PRR	1901	1903	Manufacturers Railway	
Toledo and Northwestern Railroad		DT&I	1904	1904	Toledo, Ann Arbor and Detroit Railroad	
Toledo, Norwalk and Cleveland Railroad		NYC	1850	1853	Cleveland and Toledo Railroad	
Toledo and Ohio Central Railway		NYC	1885	1952	New York Central Railroad	
Toledo and Ohio Central Extension Railroad						
Toledo and Ohio Northern Railway						
Toledo and Ottawa Beach Railway		CN/ NKP	1898	1899	Pleasant Bay Railway	
Toledo Railway and Terminal Company		B&O/ CN/ C&O/ NKP/ NYC/ PM/ PRR	1901	1907	Toledo Terminal Railroad	
Toledo and Rossford Railroad						
Toledo, St. Louis and Kansas City Railroad		NKP	1886	1900	Toledo, St. Louis and Western Railroad	
Toledo, St. Louis and Western Railroad		NKP	1900	1923	New York, Chicago and St. Louis Railroad	
Toledo Southeastern Railway						
Toledo and State Line Railroad		AA	1872	1878	Toledo and Ann Arbor Railroad	
Toledo Terminal Railroad	TT	B&O/ CN/ C&O/ NKP/ NYC/ PM/ PRR	1907	1989	CSX Transportation	
Toledo, Tiffin and Eastern Railroad		PRR	1871	1876	Northwestern Ohio Railway	
Toledo and Wabash Railroad		WAB	1858	1858	Toledo and Wabash Railway	
Toledo and Wabash Railway		WAB	1858	1865	Toledo, Wabash and Western Railway	
Toledo, Wabash and Western Railroad		WAB	1856	1858	Toledo and Wabash Railroad	
Toledo, Wabash and Western Railway		WAB	1865	1876	Wabash Railway	
Toledo, Walhonding Valley and Ohio Railroad		PRR	1891	1911	Toledo, Columbus and Ohio River Railroad	
Toledo Western Railroad		WAB	1889	1889	Wabash Railroad	
Toledo and Woodville Railroad		PRR	1869	1878	Northwestern Ohio Railway	
Trumbull and Mahoning Railroad		B&O	1887	1915	Baltimore and Ohio Railroad	
Union Depot Company		NYC/ PRR	1872	1976	Consolidated Rail Corporation	
Union Railroad		B&O	1858	1860	Marietta and Cincinnati Railroad	
United Terminal Railway		B&O	1889	1895	Marietta Railway	
Valley Railway		B&O	1871	1895	Cleveland Terminal and Valley Railway	
Van Wert, Paulding and Michigan Railway		NYC	1874	1881	Cincinnati, Van Wert and Michigan Railroad	
Vandalia Railroad		PRR	1913	1917	Pittsburgh, Cincinnati, Chicago and St. Louis Railroad	
Wabash Railroad	WAB	WAB	1942	1991	Norfolk and Western Railway	
Wabash Railroad		WAB	1889	1915	Wabash Railway	
Wabash Railway		WAB	1915	1942	Wabash Railroad	
Wabash Railway		WAB	1877	1879	Wabash, St. Louis and Pacific Railway	
Wabash Railway of Ohio		WAB	1876	1877	Wabash Railway	
Wabash Pittsburgh Terminal Railway	WPT	P&WV	1904	1916	Pittsburgh and West Virginia Railway	
Wabash, St. Louis and Pacific Railway		WAB	1879	1886	Detroit and State Line Wabash Railroad, Toledo Western Railroad	
Wabash Western Railway		WAB	1889	1889	Wabash Railroad	
Walhonding Valley Railway		PRR	1889	1891	Toledo, Walhonding Valley and Ohio Railroad	
Waynesburg and Canton Railroad		W&LE	1888	1891	Cleveland and Canton Railroad	
Waynesville, Port William and Jeffersonville Railroad		DT&I	1875	1877	Columbus, Washington and Cincinnati Railroad	
Wellston and Jackson Belt Railway		C&O	1895	1930	Chesapeake and Ohio Railway	
Wheeling Bridge and Terminal Railway		PRR	1889	1900	Wheeling Terminal Railway	
Wheeling and Cincinnati Mineral Railway		B&O	1882	1883	Cincinnati, Wheeling and New York Railroad	
Wheeling and Cleveland Railroad		NYC	1895	1901	Lake Erie, Alliance and Wheeling Railroad	
Wheeling and Harrisburg Railway of West Virginia		PRR	1884	1889	Wheeling Bridge and Terminal Railway	
Wheeling and Lake Erie Railroad		W&LE	1899	1916	Wheeling and Lake Erie Railway	
Wheeling and Lake Erie Railroad		W&LE	1871	1886	Wheeling and Lake Erie Railway	
Wheeling and Lake Erie Railway	W&LE, WLE	W&LE	1916	1988	Norfolk and Western Railway	
Wheeling and Lake Erie Railway		W&LE	1886	1899	Wheeling and Lake Erie Railroad	
Wheeling and Lake Erie Bridge Company		W&LE	1881	1887	Wheeling and Lake Erie Railway	
Wheeling Terminal Railway		PRR	1900	1954	Penndel Company	
Wicks and Wells Railroad		ERIE	1871	1882	Youngstown and Austintown Railway	
Youngstown Railroad		ERIE	1871	1882	Youngstown and Austintown Railway	
Youngstown and Austintown Railway		ERIE	1871	1941	Erie Railroad	
Youngstown and Canfield Railroad		PRR	1872	1873	Lawrence Railroad	
Youngstown and Connotton Valley Railroad		W&LE	1877	1879	Connotton Valley Railroad	
Youngstown, Lawrence and Pittsburgh Railroad		PRR	1887	1887	Pittsburgh, Youngstown and Ashtabula Railroad	
Youngstown, New Castle and Pittsburgh Railroad		B&O	1875	1875	Pittsburgh and Northwestern Railroad	
Youngstown and Northern Railroad	YN		1909	1981	N/A	
Youngstown and Pittsburg Railroad		PLE	1877	1878	Pittsburgh and Lake Erie Railroad	
Youngstown and Ravenna Railroad		PRR	1899	1954	Penndel Company	
Youngstown and Salem Railroad		PLE/ PRR	1903	1903	Youngstown and Southern Railway	
Youngstown and Southern Railway	YS	PLE/ PRR	1944	1996	Railroad Ventures, Inc.	
Youngstown and Southern Railway		PLE/ PRR	1903	1916	Youngstown and Suburban Railway	
Youngstown and Suburban Railway	YS	PLE/ PRR	1916	1944	Youngstown and Southern Railway	
Youngstown and State Line Railroad		B&O	1881	1881	Pittsburgh and Western Railroad	
Zanesville Belt and Terminal Railway		W&LE	1901	1948	Wheeling and Lake Erie Railway	
Zanesville, McConnellsville and Pomeroy Railway		B&O	1883	1885	Chicago, Zanesville and Atlantic Railway	
Zanesville, Mount Vernon and Marion Railway		W&LE	1886	1895	Zanesville Belt and Terminal Railway	
Zanesville and Ohio River Railway		B&O	1886	1900	Ohio and Little Kanawha Railroad	
Zanesville and South Eastern Railway		PRR	1881	1882	Bellaire, Zanesville and Cincinnati Railway	
Zanesville Terminal Railroad		NYC/ PRR	1902	1969	Penndel Company	
Zanesville Terminal Railway		NYC/ PRR	1890	1902	Zanesville Terminal Railroad	
Zanesville and Western Railway		NYC	1902	1938	Toledo and Ohio Central Railway	

Electric railways

- Akron, Bedford and Cleveland Railroad
- Akron and Cuyahoga Falls Rapid Transit Company
- Blissfield Railroad
- Canton and Massillon Electric Railway
- Cincinnati, Dayton and Toledo Traction
- Cincinnati, Hamilton and Dayton Railway
- Cincinnati and Lake Erie Railroad
- Cincinnati Street Railway
- Cleveland Railway
- Cleveland, Southwestern & Columbus Railway
- Columbus, Delaware and Marion Railway
- Columbus, Marion and Bucyrus Railway
- Dayton and Western Traction Company
- Lake Shore Electric Railway
- Muskingum Electric Railroad (private)
- Newark and Granville Electric Street Railway
- Ohio Electric Railway (OE)
- Sandusky, Milan and Norwalk Electric Railway
- Shaker Heights Rapid Transit
- Toledo and Indiana Railway
- Toledo, Port Clinton and Lakeside Railway
- Toledo and Western Railway (T&W)
- Youngstown and Ohio River Railroad
