= List of Pennsylvania Railroad predecessor railroads =

The following railroads merged to form the Pennsylvania Railroad (PRR). On February 1, 1968, the PRR merged into Pennsylvania New York Central Transportation.

The following PRR-owned and leased companies were still separate at the time of the Penn Central merger:

- Pennsylvania-Reading Seashore Lines
- Baltimore and Eastern Railroad
  - The Baltimore, Chesapeake and Atlantic Railway was conveyed to the Baltimore and Eastern Railroad May 1, 1928.
- Caton and Loudon Railway
- Cleveland and Pittsburgh Railroad
- Connecting Railway
  - The Pennsylvania, Ohio and Detroit Railroad merged into the Connecting Railway December 9, 1956.
    - The Cincinnati, Lebanon and Northern Railway, Cleveland, Akron and Cincinnati Railway, Manufacturers Railway, Pennsylvania-Detroit Railroad and Toledo, Columbus and Ohio River Railroad merged into the Pennsylvania, Ohio and Detroit Railroad December 10, 1925.
        - Cincinnati and Muskingum Valley Railroad consolidated with the Cleveland, Akron & Columbus Railway to form the Cleveland, Akron & Cincinnati Railway July 1, 1911.
- Delaware Railroad
- Erie and Pittsburgh Railroad
- Little Miami Railroad
  - The Dayton and Western Railroad merged into the Little Miami Railroad December 27, 1943.
  - The Columbus and Xenia Railroad merged into the Little Miami Railroad December 1, 1943.
- Northern Central Railway
  - The Elmira and Lake Ontario Railroad merged into the Northern Central Railway January 31, 1956.
- Pennsylvania and Atlantic Railroad
- Pennsylvania Tunnel and Terminal Railroad
- Philadelphia, Baltimore and Washington Railroad
  - The Philadelphia, Wilmington and Baltimore Railroad and the Baltimore and Potomac Railroad were consolidated to form the Philadelphia, Baltimore and Washington Railroad November 1, 1902
  - The Columbia and Port Deposit Railroad was purchased by PRR in about 1877 (Pennsylvania portion) and 1890 (Maryland portion). The line was assigned to the Philadelphia, Baltimore, and Washington Railroad May 12, 1893 and formally merged September 15, 1916.
    - The Washington and Maryland Line Railroad, later called the Columbia and Maryland Line Railroad, was merged into the Columbia and Port Deposit Railroad September 27, 1864.
  - The Philadelphia and Baltimore Central Railroad merged into the Philadelphia, Baltimore and Washington Railroad September 15, 1916.
  - Baltimore and Sparrows Point Railroad merged into the Philadelphia, Baltimore and Washington Railroad January 3, 1919.
  - The Pittsburgh, Cincinnati, Chicago and St. Louis Railroad merged into the Philadelphia, Baltimore and Washington Railroad April 2, 1956.
    - The Pittsburgh, Cincinnati, Chicago and St. Louis Railway, Anderson Belt Railway, Chicago, Indiana and Eastern Railway, Pittsburgh, Wheeling and Kentucky Railroad and Vandalia Railroad merged into the Pittsburgh, Cincinnati, Chicago and St. Louis Railroad January 1, 1917.
    - Cincinnati, Richmond and Fort Wayne Railroad merged into the Pittsburgh, Cincinnati, Chicago and St. Louis Railroad June 9, 1927.
  - The Delaware, Maryland and Virginia Railroad merged into the Philadelphia, Baltimore and Washington Railroad January 31, 1956.
- Philadelphia and Erie Railroad
- Philadelphia and Trenton Railroad
- Pittsburgh, Fort Wayne and Chicago Railway
- Pittsburgh, Youngstown and Ashtabula Railway
- Shamokin Valley and Pottsville Railroad
- Union Railroad of Baltimore
- United New Jersey Railroad and Canal Company
  - The Belvidere Delaware Railroad, Perth Amboy and Woodbridge Railroad and Rocky Hill Railroad and Transportation Company merged into the United New Jersey Railroad and Canal Company January 1, 1958.
  - The New York Bay Railroad merged into the United New Jersey Railroad and Canal Company February 29, 1956.
  - The Harrison and East Newark Connecting Railroad merged into the United New Jersey Railroad and Canal Company December 31, 1954.
  - The Millstone and New Brunswick Railroad was dissolved and its assets were sold to the United New Jersey Railroad and Canal Company April 21, 1915.
- West Jersey and Seashore Railroad

Also existing was the Penndel Company, incorporated in Delaware November 20, 1953, to absorb railroad subsidiaries.

- The Rosslynn Connecting Railroad merged into the Penndel Company December 1, 1969.
- The Elmira and Williamsport Railroad merged into the Penndel Company July 1, 1969.
- The Camden and Burlington County Railway, Cumberland Valley and Martinsburg Railroad, Freehold and Jamesburg Agricultural Railroad and New York, Philadelphia and Norfolk Railroad (NYP&N) merged into the Penndel Company January 1, 1958.
  - The Cape Charles Railroad merged into the New York, Philadelphia and Norfolk Railroad (NYP&N) January 1, 1918.
- The Terre Haute and Peoria Railroad merged into the Penndel Company February 1, 1957.
- The Lykens Valley Railroad and Coal Company merged into the Penndel Company August 31, 1956.
- The Detroit Union Railroad, Depot and Station Company, New Cumberland and Pittsburgh Railway, Western New York and Pennsylvania Railway, Wheeling Coal Railroad and Wheeling and Eastern Railroad merged into the Penndel Company December 31, 1954.
  - The Bradford Railroad merged into the Western New York and Pennsylvania Railroad January 29, 1932.
- The Delaware River Railroad and Bridge Company, Englewood Connecting Railway, Grand Rapids and Indiana Railway, Indianapolis and Frankfort Railroad, Ohio Connecting Railway, Pittsburgh, Ohio Valley and Cincinnati Railroad, South Chicago and Southern Railroad, Southern Pennsylvania Railway and Mining Company, Wheeling Terminal Railway, York, Hanover and Frederick Railway and Youngstown and Ravenna Railway merged into the Penndel Company December 31, 1953.
- The assets of the Louisville Bridge and Terminal Railway were sold to the Penndel Company December 30, 1953.

== Dissolved companies ==
- The New York and Long Island Terminal Railway was dissolved September 29, 1905.
- The Western Washington Railroad was dissolved October 2, 1908.
- The Muskegon, Grand Rapids and Indiana Railroad was dissolved April 24, 1918.
- The Traverse City Railroad was dissolved May 28, 1918.
- Maryland, Delaware and Virginia Railway was dissolved May 7, 1923.
- The Northern Central Connecting Railway was dissolved April 27, 1925.
- The Barnegat Railroad was dissolved October 8, 1925.
- The Roxborough Railroad was dissolved August 16, 1926.
- The Traverse City, Leelanau and Manistique Railway was dissolved October 31, 1926.
- The Chambersburg and Gettysburg Electric Railway was dissolved December 21, 1926.
- The Canton and East Liverpool Railroad and Massillon and Little Beaver Railroad were dissolved June 3, 1927.
- The Tipton Railroad was dissolved June 8, 1927.
- The Connecting Terminal Railroad was dissolved June 10, 1931.
- The St. Louis Connecting Railroad was dissolved September 24, 1931.
- The Mineral Railroad and Mining Company was dissolved May 17, 1932.
- The Lorain, Ashland and Southern Railroad was dissolved July 12, 1932.
- The Johnsonburg Railroad was dissolved August 22, 1932.
- The Waynesburg and Washington Railroad was dissolved October 7, 1932.
- The Massillon and Cleveland Railroad was dissolved October 25, 1932.
- The Sharpsville Railroad was dissolved December 17, 1932.
- The Ohio River and Western Railway was dissolved March 15, 1935.
- The Philadelphia and Beach Haven Railroad was dissolved June 24, 1937.
- The Pennsylvania and Newark Railroad was dissolved December 21, 1956.
