= Ohio Central Railroad =

Ohio Central Railroad may refer to:

- Ohio Central Railroad System, acquired by Genesee and Wyoming in 2008
  - Ohio Central Railroad (1988), one part of the system, operating a former Wheeling and Lake Erie Railway line between Warwick and Zanesville
- Ohio Central Railroad (1879–1885), predecessor of the New York Central Railroad
- Central Ohio Railroad (1847–1915), predecessor of the Baltimore and Ohio Railroad
