= Ohio Southern Railroad (1986) =

Overview
- Parent company: Genesee and Wyoming
- Headquarters: Coshocton, Ohio
- Reporting mark: OSRR

Technical
- Track gauge: 4 ft 8 1/2 in (1,435 mm) standard gauge
- Length: 21 miles (34 km)

Other
- Website: www.gwrr.com/osrr

Ohio Southern Railroad (reporting mark OSRR) is a railroad owned by Genesee & Wyoming Inc. It begins in Zanesville, Ohio along the intersections of Ohio Central Railroad and Columbus and Ohio River Railroad which are both also owned by Genesee & Wyoming. The other end of the line is in New Lexington, Ohio, with trackage rights on the Kanawha River Railroad (formerly Norfolk Southern) to South Glouster, Ohio. As of 2024, it has a total track miles of 21 miles (34 km)

The company was acquired by Genesee & Wyoming in 2008 as part of its purchase of the Ohio Central Railroad System.
