= Toledo Terminal Railroad =

American railway company

Overview
- Dates of operation: 1907–1983

The Toledo Terminal Railroad was a railway company in the U.S. state of Ohio. Primarily a switching railroad, it made a complete loop around the city of Toledo, crossing the Maumee River twice.

== History ==
The Toledo Terminal Railway and Terminal Company was chartered on September 13, 1900, to build a belt line around Toledo, connecting the 24 rail lines that entered the city at the time. Its completion was announced as early as September 1902, but later valuations pegged its opening at October 1, 1903. At this stage, the company was controlled solely by the Pere Marquette Railway. In 1907, the assets of this company was sold to the Toledo Terminal Railroad Company. This company expanded upon the work of its predecessor by adding 10 miles of secondary main track, yard tracks and sidings in 1914.

By 1930, the Pere Marquette was joined in control of the TTR by eight other railroad companies, all servicing the city and by extension the belt line: the Cincinnati, Hamilton and Dayton Railway; the Michigan Central; the New York Central; the Pennsylvania; the Grand Trunk Western; the Toledo, St. Louis and Western; the Toledo and Ohio Central; and the Hocking Valley Railway. The line had been double-tracked all the way around the city of Toledo, except for the portion around the Upper Maumee Bridge. In 1957, the Grand Trunk Western announced they would return their stock to the TTR.

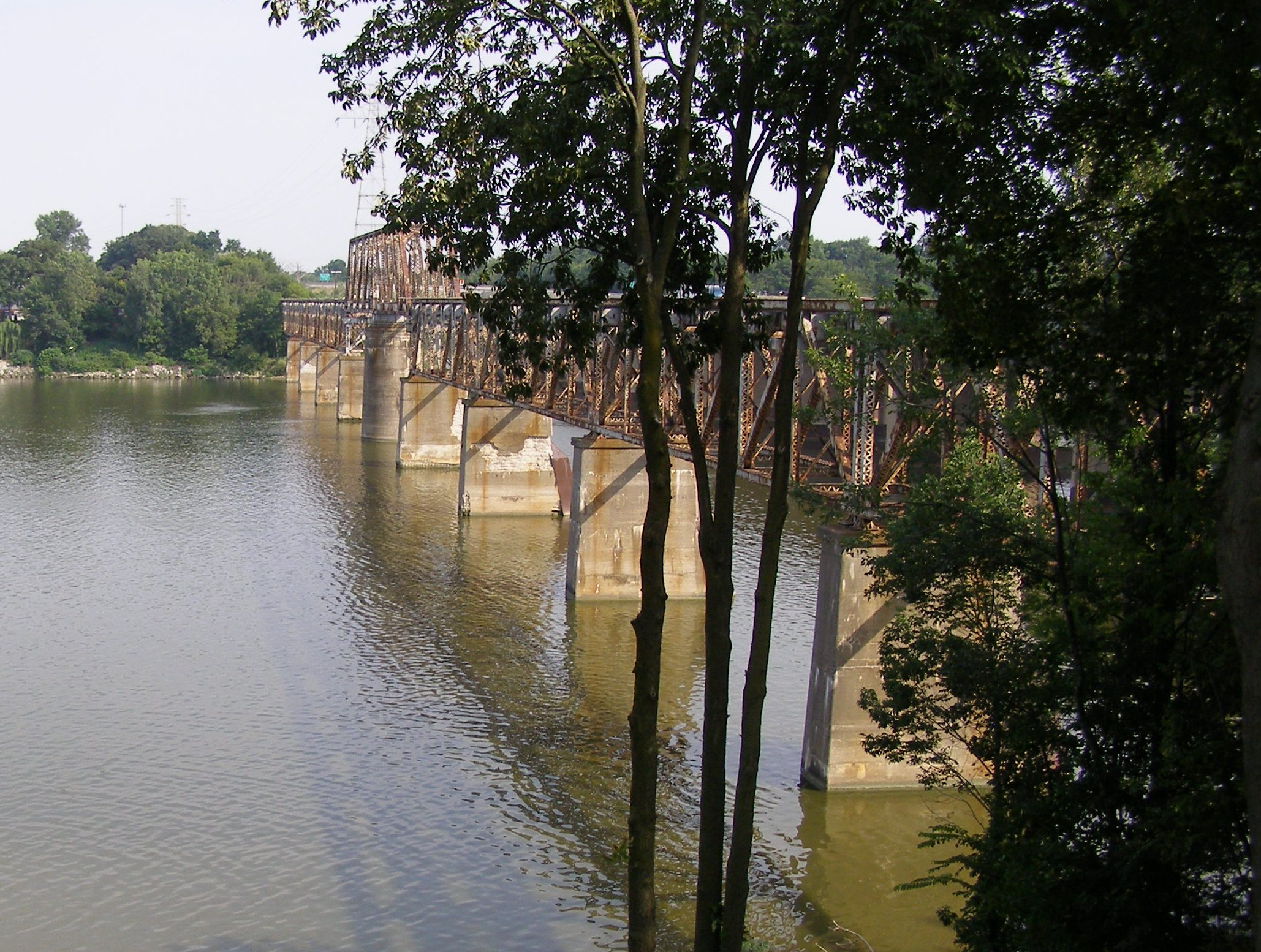
The Toledo Terminal Upper Maumee River Swing Bridge. Built in 1902, it was abandoned after it was damaged by a March 1982 derailment. It was demolished between October 2018 and May 2019.

On March 17, 1982, a train derailed on the Upper Maumee Bridge, damaging it. The Toledo Terminal elected not to fix the bridge, instead abandoning it, stirring up much controversy.

In 1983 it announced plans to lay continuous welded rail in north and west Toledo. Later that year, the acquisition by the Chessie system of control of 89.2% of TTR stock was approved by the Interstate Commerce Commisison. In the preceding decades, the joint control of the TTR was consolidated as its controllers merged and went bankrupt: the Chessie system directly controlled 28.5% of the company due to it being a reorganization of the Chesapeake and Ohio, which the Hocking Valley and the Pere Marquette had folded into; its subsidiary, the Baltimore and Ohio Railroad, took over from the CH&D and thus controlled 17.8%; and the remaining 42.5% was taken over from Conrail, who took over from Penn Central, the successor to the New York Central (also the owner of the Michigan Central and the Toledo and Ohio Central) and the Pennsylvania. The bulk of the remainder, 10.7%, was controlled by the Norfolk and Western Railway, which had acquired the Nickel Plate Railroad, the company that had previously acquired the TStL&W. In 1984, the Chessie took complete control of the TTR and dissolved the company into itself, with the N&W left with only a purchase option of $1 for any tracks let up by the Chessie, a right they exercised in 1989 when they acquired 7 miles of track.

In January 2010, CSX Transportation, the successor to the Chessie, petitioned to abandon the rest of the "Backside" of the Toledo Terminal (the portion on the west side of the Maumee River) from Temperance, on Toledo's north side, to a small portion just north of Norfolk Southern's Chicago Main, in Vulcan. All of the removal track has since been completed, and plans are underway to turn the right-of-way into a rail trail. This leaves only a small, inactive segment from the Vulcan to the ex-Wabash mainline near Gould on Toledo's south side.

The portion of the Toledo Terminal from Temperance to Bates, mainly the east of the Maumee River, is still in use by CSX.
