= Ashtabula, Carson and Jefferson Railroad =

Railroad in Ohio, USA

Ashtabula, Carson & Jefferson Railroad
Overview
- Headquarters: Jefferson, Ohio
- Reporting mark: ACJR
- Locale: Ashtabula County, Ohio
- Dates of operation: 1984–present

Technical
- Track gauge: 4 ft 8 1/2 in (1,435 mm)
- Length: 6 miles (9.7 km)

Other
- Website: http://wp.acjrailroad.com/

The Ashtabula, Carson & Jefferson Railroad or Ashtabula, Carson & Jefferson Scenic Railroad (reporting mark ACJR) is a Class III railroad that operates from a junction in Carson to Jefferson in Ashtabula County, Ohio. The main commodities hauled on the line are fertilizer, paper for corrugated boxes, and plastic pellets used in injection molding.

== History ==
ACJR operates on one of the few remaining portions of the Lake Shore & Michigan Southern Railway's Franklin Division. The line was built by the LS&MS between 1871 and 1872, and serviced communities south of Ashtabula including Plymouth, Griggs, Jefferson, Leon, and Andover. These communities were serviced with heavy freight and passenger service to and from Ashtabula. What used to be a day's travel to Ashtabula could be done in an hour or less.

== AC&J Railway ==
The Ashtabula Carson & Jefferson Railroad Company (AC&J) was chartered in 1984 by a local businessman, working with the State of Ohio, to preserve the 6-mile-long (9.7 km) Jefferson Industrial Track. Since 1984, the AC&J has developed business locally, and primarily hauls fertilizer, paper used in the manufacturing of corrugated boxes, and plastic pellets used in injection molding. Freight operations occur 7 days a week, 365 days a year. Additionally, the AC&J transloads bulk commodities from rail car to truck for shipment locally. The fertilizer and plastic pellet shipments are examples of this business segment. The AC&J hauls 1200 cars per year.

The AC&J Railroad's sister company, AC&J Scenic Line, Inc., operated passenger excursions from 1991 to 2014.

== Today ==
The ACJR still operates freight out of Jefferson, Ohio. The scenic railroad and its excursion service was terminated in 2014.

== Engine roster ==
| No. | Model | Builder | Status |
|---|---|---|---|
| 7371 | ALCO S-1 | American Locomotive Company | Operational/stored |
| 107 | ALCO S-2 | American Locomotive Company | Stored/taken off rail as parts source |
| 518 | ALCO S-2 | American Locomotive Company | Ex Erie, Parts source until September 24, 2012, when it was given to The Meadville Railroad Depot Museum |
| HZRX 2391 | GE U23B | GE Transportation | Lease unit, operational, main power for road and switch |

== See also ==
- List of Ohio railroads
- List of common carrier freight railroads in the United States
- Lake Shore & Michigan Southern Railway
