= Cleveland, Tuscarawas Valley and Wheeling Railway =

Map

Cleveland, Tuscarawas Valley and Wheeling Railway operated in eastern Ohio and West Virginia from 1875 to 1882.

The Lakeshore and Tuscarawas Valley Railway Company organized by filing with the Ohio Secretary of State on July 2, 1870 to build a road from near Berea to Mill Township, Tuscarawas County, Ohio where it would interchange with the Pittsburgh, Cincinnati and St. Louis Railway, with a branch to Elyria. The road was completed in August 1873 from Elyria through Grafton, Massillon, and New Philadelphia to Uhrichsville. On October 30, 1872, the company purchased the Elyria and Black River Railroad forming a line from Uhrichsville to Lorain on Lake Erie.

The Lakeshore and Tuscarawas Valley Railway Company filed a certificate March 3, 1873 to extend a line from Uhrichsville into Washington Township, Harrison County. Foreclosure was filed on the railroad July, 1874, for $2,180,000 debt, and it sold for one million dollars January 26, 1875, to a company that incorporated February 5, 1875 as the Cleveland, Tuscarawas Valley and Wheeling Railway. The line was completed to Wheeling, West Virginia, and the company operated until 1882, when it again fell into receivership, and later was sold to the Cleveland, Lorain and Wheeling Railroad Company.

== See also ==
- List of Ohio railroads
