= Fremont and Indiana Railroad =

Former railroad in Northwest Ohio

Lines of the Lake Erie and Louisville Railroad and successive companies before consolidations into larger systems

The Fremont and Indiana Railroad existed in Northwest Ohio beginning in 1853.

== Origin ==
The Fremont and Indiana Railroad Company was incorporated April 25, 1853 by L. Q. Rawson, Sardis Birchard, James Justice, John R. Pease, and Charles W. Foster. The route was to be from Fremont, Ohio through Fostoria, Findlay, and through Hancock, Allen, Auglaize and Darke counties to the western boundary of Ohio. Directors were chosen and L. Q. Rawson was elected president, Andrew J. Hale as secretary and Squire Carlin treasurer.

Track was constructed to Fostoria, then known as Rome, and freight and passengers cars began running February 1, 1859. The road was built to Findlay in 1860, but the line went bankrupt and was sold to creditors in 1862 for $20,000.

== Fremont, Lima and Union Railroad ==
On January 21, 1862, a new company named the Fremont, Lima and Union Railroad Company was incorporated with L Q. Lawson, president and R. W. B. McClellan, secretary and treasurer.

== Lake Erie and Louisville Rail Road ==
In 1865, the Fremont, Lima and Union Railroad merged with the Lake Erie and Pacific Railroad Company, which had begun construction on a line from Union City and Rushville, to form the Lake Erie and Louisville Rail Road Company. The aim was to form a line between Louisville and Fremont, the head of navigation on the Sandusky River. Heavy freight could be offloaded onto ships to descend the Sandusky River, cross Lake Erie to Buffalo, New York and thence to the east coast. Passengers and light freight would pass east and west through Fremont. This line lasted until April, 1871, when it passed into receivership. L. Q. Lawson was appointed receiver by the U. S. Circuit Court, and the company was sold to bond holders October 18, 1871. The company lingered on, though, operating its line from Cambridge City to Rushville until 1890, when it was sold to the Jeffersonville, Madison and Indianapolis Railroad.

== Lake Erie and Louisville Railway ==
On November 4, 1871, the Ohio portions of the railroad were re-organized as the Fremont, Lima and Union Railway Company, and the incomplete Indiana portion east of Cambridge City was organized November 18, 1871 as the Lake Erie and Louisville Railway Company. The Lake Erie and Louisville abandoned its line, and bought the assets of the Fremont, Lima and Union in January 1872. These companies merged April 12, 1872 under the name Lake Erie and Louisville Rail Way Company, and this company extended the road to St. Mary's. This road was foreclosed, and placed under Isadore H. Burgoon, receiver, on April 25, 1874. The road was sold by the court in 1877, and continued to be managed by Burgoon until September, 1879. During this time two forks of the railroad were constructed to Minster and Celina. It was then consolidated with the Indianapolis and Sandusky Rail Road to form the Lake Erie and Western Railway.

== See also ==
List of Ohio railroads
