= Elmira and Williamsport Railroad =

Overview
- Headquarters: Williamsport
- Locale: New York, Pennsylvania
- Dates of operation: 1830s–1863
- Successor: Northern Central Railway

Technical
- Track gauge: 4 ft 8 1/2 in (1,435 mm) standard gauge

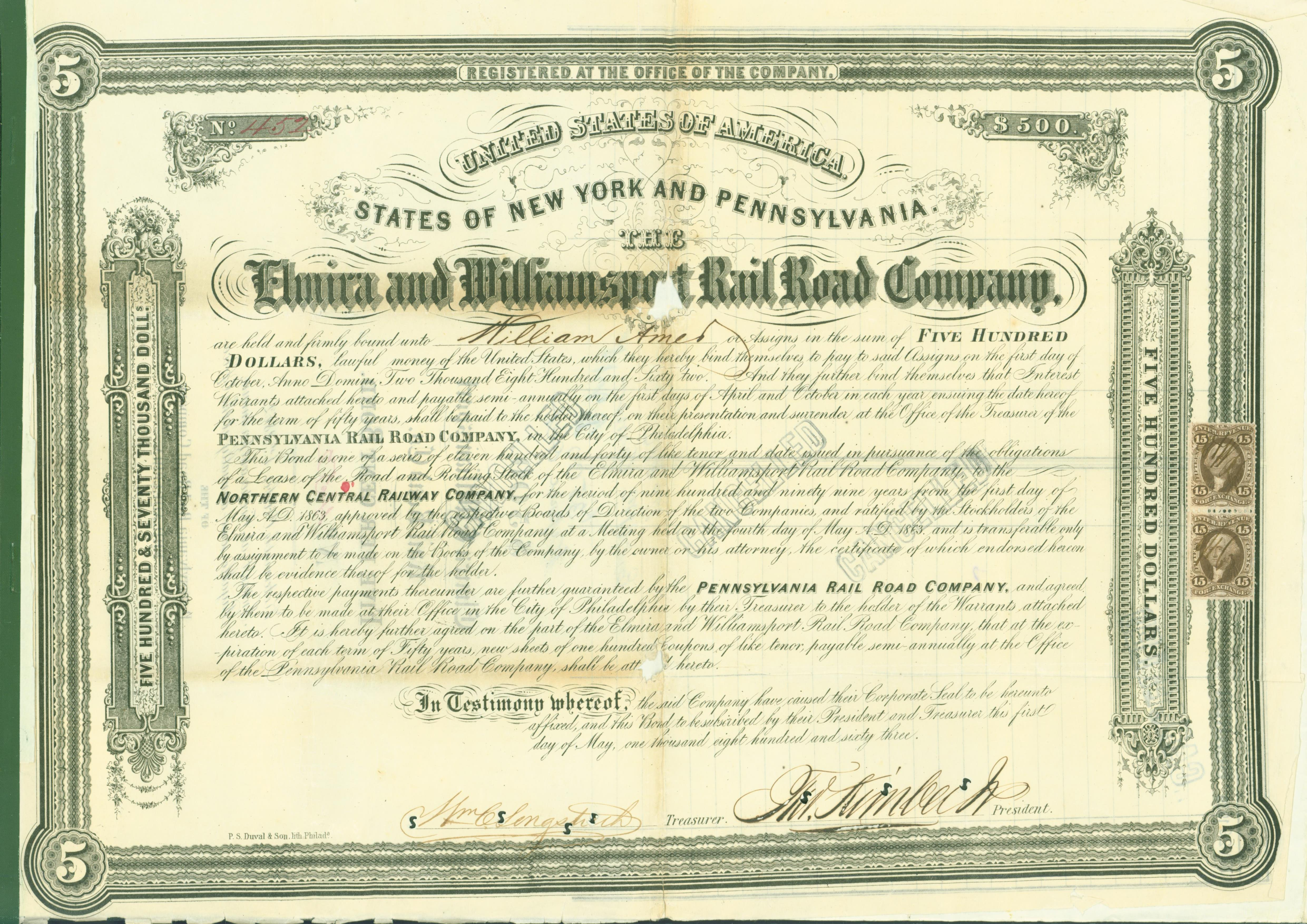
Bond of the Elmira and Williamsport Rail Road Company, issued 1 may 1863

The Elmira and Williamsport Railroad (earlier Williamsport and Elmira Railroad) is a historic railroad that operated in Pennsylvania.

The W&E was organized in 1832 and ran between Williamsport, Pennsylvania and Elmira, New York. It was reorganized as the E&W in 1860, and operated its own property until 1863.

The railroad originally ran north from Williamsport along Lycoming Creek as far as the village of Ralston, and was only extended beyond it to Elmira in 1854.

In 1863 the line was leased by the Northern Central Railway, and in 1910 the line was leased by the Pennsylvania Railroad. The line continued to operate until 1972, when it was destroyed by flooding from Hurricane Agnes.

ELMIRA & WILLIAMSPORT RR CO (PA) Merged into [Penndel Company. 07/01/1969. Each share Preferred $50 par exchanged for $55 cash Each share Common $50 par exchanged for $38.50 cash
