= Deer Creek Tunnel =

Coordinates: 39°07′01″N 84°29′56″W

Overview
- Line: Dayton and Cincinnati Railroad
- Location: Walnut Hills, Cincinnati, Ohio, United States

Operation
- Owner: Conrail

The Deer Creek Tunnel is an incomplete and abandoned double-track railroad tunnel through the Walnut Hills in Cincinnati, Ohio, United States. Construction was begun in the 1850s by the broad gauge Dayton and Cincinnati Railroad, but ceased in 1855 due to lack of funds, and was never restarted.

The Dayton and Cincinnati Railroad was incorporated in February 1847 as the Dayton, Lebanon and Deerfield Railroad, and renamed Dayton, Springboro, Lebanon and Cincinnati Railroad in February 1848, Dayton and Cincinnati Railroad in February 1849, and Cincinnati Railway Tunnel Company in January 1872. The Cincinnati, Lebanon and Northern Railway, a Pennsylvania Railroad subsidiary which itself had the much shorter Oak Street Tunnel in the same area, acquired the unfinished tunnel in September 1902 after a foreclosure sale in May 1896. Ownership passed to the Pennsylvania, Ohio and Detroit Railroad in January 1926 and the Connecting Railway in May 1956, and remained with the Penn Central Company when Conrail took over that company's profitable rail assets in 1976.

== Deer Creek ==
Deer Creek was a stream adjacent to the tunnel project in the valley between Mount Auburn and Eden Park. By 1904, it had been covered by streets and converted into a sewer.
