= Akron and Barberton Belt Railroad =

Overview
- Headquarters: Barberton, Ohio
- Reporting mark: ABB
- Locale: Barberton, Ohio
- Dates of operation: 1902–1994
- Successor: Akron Barberton Cluster Railway

Technical
- Track gauge: 4 ft 8 1/2 in (1,435 mm) standard gauge

The Akron and Barberton Belt Railroad (reporting mark ABB) was a switching railroad that was built to serve various industries around the cities of Barberton and Akron in Ohio. It was formed through the consolidation of several formerly independent lines that totaled 22.96 miles (36.95 km), initially creating a core 13-mile (21 km) system serving local industries.

The main purpose was to switch chemical cars for Pittsburgh Plate Glass, Babcox and Wilcox Companies as well as O.C. Barber's match works, all in Barberton. It was controlled by the Akron, Canton and Youngstown, Baltimore and Ohio, Pennsylvania and Erie railroads. It interchanged railroad cars with the Erie Railroad in Barberton, Pennsylvania RR in Barberton and Akron, Akron Canton & Youngstown at East Akron and Belt Junction west of Fairlawn, and the Baltimore & Ohio RR in East Akron and Barberton. The railroad was always a freight-only carrier. The East Akron line ran south of Barberton before curving back north, passing through Kenmore, South Akron, East Akron, and ending at the Akron Canton and Youngstown Railroad Brittian Yard in far Eastern Akron.

The Fairlawn line ran due north from Barberton, in connection with the Akron Canton and Youngstown Railroad at Belt Junction just west of Fairlawn. The three-track interchange yard at Belt Junction was out of service for many years during the 1920s and 1930s due to damage but was used by the Akron Canton and Youngstown Railroad to hold overflow cars from the Minnesota Mining and Manufacturing plant just east of Copley. The interchange was restored around World War II.

== Motive power ==
During its early operations, prior to 1942, the railroad utilized 0-6-0 and 2-6-0 steam locomotives. Because the line did not utilize cabooses until the 1940s, these early steam engines were equipped with characteristic "doghouses" on their tenders to shelter the train crew.

Between 1942 and 1972, the ABB modernized its motive power with four Baldwin switching locomotives. In 1964, they purchased an additional ALCO RS-3 locomotive from the Pennsylvania Railroad. These worn-out locomotives were scrapped in 1972 when the railroad began using leased motive power from Precision National Corporation. On many occasions, the Belt would lease from the four owners, most notably the N&W. This lasted until October 1982 when two EMD SW1500 locomotives were purchased from Conrail. These two units made up the motive power roster on the system toward the end of its corporate existence.

== Late 20th century changes ==
In 1984, PPG industries in Barberton closed up most of their operations and ABB lost 65% of their business. However, luck turned around in 1985, when they acquired Conrail trackage in Rittman and gained access to the Morton Salt and Packaging Corporation of America factories.

In 1994 the railroad was sold to the Akron Barberton Cluster Railway which in turn is owned by the Wheeling and Lake Erie Railway. The line from Firestone Park to the W&LE's Britain yard in east Akron was taken soon after, along with the line north from Barberton to Belt Junction in Fairlawn, where a connection was made with the Akron Canton & Youngstown RR, also an industrial branch line in Barberton. Much of the main yard was rebuilt in 2005 to make room for the new Robinson Ave. viaduct. Its main traffic includes plastic pellets for Landmark Plastics and Rubbermaid. There is a coal train three times a week and the railroad brings comics to the Akron Beacon Journal. (Note: Newsprint delivery by rail was ceased in 2009. The spur off of the CSX main and all trackage to the Beacon Journal has been removed.)

The tracks themselves are owned by Akron METRO which also runs the Transit Agency. Future plans are to attract more industry and rebuild the Erie Lackawanna line for freight and passenger service to Kent State University. (Note: METRO owns only the former Erie line from Akron to Kent, and is inoperable as of 2011.)

The only former Erie line that ABCR runs on is from Kent, and Barberton to Rittman.

A rail trail, the Rubber City Heritage Trail, is proposed to run along the line.
