= Cleveland, Akron and Columbus Railway =

American railroad company

Overview
- Headquarters: Akron, Ohio
- Locale: Ohio, United States
- Dates of operation: 1885–1911
- Predecessor: Cleveland, Mount Vernon and Delaware Railroad
- Successor: Cleveland, Akron & Cincinnati Railway (1911, internal); Pennsylvania Company

Technical
- Track gauge: 4 ft 8 1/2 in (1,435 mm)
- Length: 196.95 mi (316.96 km)

The Cleveland, Akron and Columbus Railway (nicknamed the "Blue Grass Route of Ohio") was a railroad company in the U.S. state of Ohio. It connected its namesake cities and served as a vital link for later parent Pennsylvania Railroad to connect Cleveland and Columbus, Ohio.

== History ==
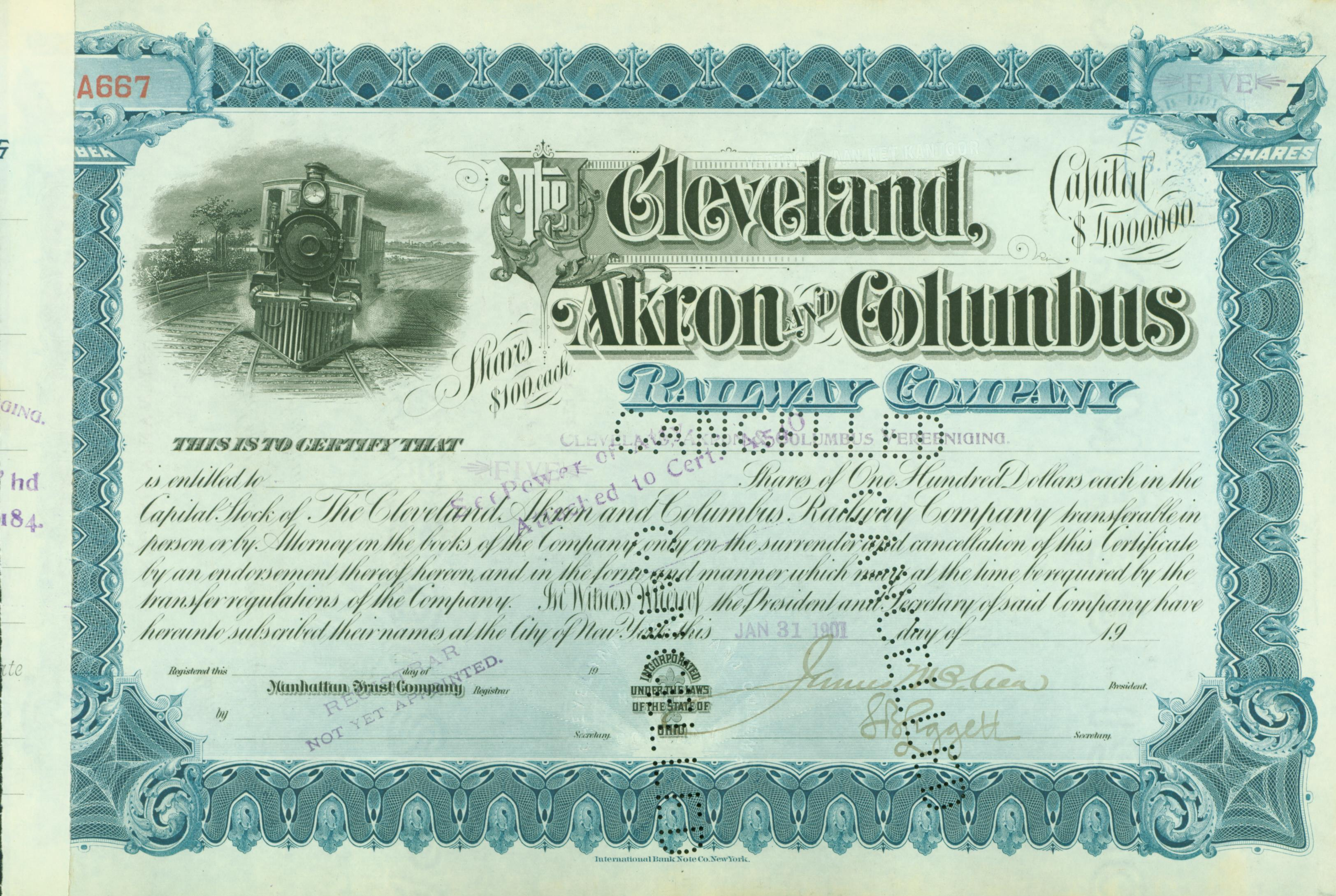
Share of the Cleveland, Akron and Columbus Railway Company, issued 31 January 1901

The company was formed through a reorganization of the Cleveland, Mount Vernon and Delaware Railroad (Note: The CMV&D was chartered on March 17, 1851, as a subsidiary of the Cleveland and Pittsburg Railroad.) on December 7, 1881, as the Cleveland, Akron and Columbus Railroad. It was rumored in 1881 that the line might become part of the Baltimore and Ohio Railroad system, as officials of that company had made visits to the property at the time. The reorganization became effective on December 31, 1885, with the first trains running under the new name Cleveland, Akron and Columbus Railway on January 1, 1886.

During the late 1880s and most of the 1890s, the railroad was controlled by Dutch investment firm Maatschappij tot Beheer van het Adminstratisckanteer van Amerikaansche Spoorwegwaarden (Company for the Management of the Administrative Office of American Railways). In later years the railroad was also controlled by the Lake Erie and Western Railroad.

Rumors of control by the Pennsylvania Railroad floated in the mid-1890s, with control of the CA&C ultimately gained in 1899. The CA&C merged with the Cincinnati and Muskingum Valley Railroad in 1911. Passenger services on the line ended on December 14, 1950.
