= Republic N&T Railroad =

Railway line in the United States of America

Overview
- Locale: Ohio
- Dates of operation: 2008–

Republic N&T Railroad is a line-haul operator in Canton, Ohio that operates on Norfolk Southern there. The company was formed in 2008. Reporting mark NTRY.
