= Detroit and Toledo Shore Line Railroad =

Historic railroad in Ohio and Michigan

Overview
- Headquarters: Detroit, Michigan, U.S.
- Reporting mark: DTS
- Locale: Detroit and Toledo
- Dates of operation: 1898–1981
- Successor: Canadian National Railway

Technical
- Track gauge: 4 ft 8 1/2 in (1,435 mm) standard gauge

The Detroit and Toledo Shore Line Railroad (reporting mark DTS) is a historic railroad that operated in northwestern Ohio and southeastern Michigan.

The Pleasant Bay Railway was incorporated in Michigan in March 1898 and purchased the Toledo and Ottawa Beach Railway, an Ohio company incorporated in January 1898, in March 1899. The resulting company was renamed the Detroit and Toledo Shore Line Railroad one month later.

It operated a multi-track mainline connecting Detroit, Michigan and Toledo, Ohio, serving several large industries. The main line between the two cities opened in 1903. The Grand Trunk Western Railway (GTW) and the Toledo, St. Louis and Western Railroad (the "Clover Leaf") co-owned the railroad from 1902 to 1923. The TStL&W ownership was transferred to its successor the New York, Chicago and St. Louis Railroad (the "Nickel Plate Road") in 1923 and then to the Norfolk and Western Railway (N&W) in 1964.

The GTW purchased the N&W's interest in the DTS in 1981. At that time the DTS was dissolved and merged into the GTW. Today, a mostly single track section with limited double track and passing sidings of the former mainline continues as the CN/GTW Shore Line Subdivision.

== History ==
The D&TSL operated 46.98 miles (75.61 km) of line between Toledo, Ohio, and Detroit, Michigan, a bridge route connecting the Motor City with the rail gateway of Toledo. Prior to the 1960s mergers resulting in Penn Central Transportation and the Norfolk and Western Railway, the link between these two cities was vitally important to the independent railroads in the area, particularly the GTW and the Nickel Plate. In 1960 it reported 243 million net ton-miles of revenue freight.

The D&TSL was originally incorporated as the Toledo & Ottawa Beach Railway in Ohio and the Pleasant Bay Railway in Michigan. In March 1899 the two companies conveyed all their property to a new company incorporated under the Michigan law as the Detroit & Toledo Shore Line. The intent was to construct the railroad as a high speed interurban connecting link between the Lake Shore Electric at Toledo and interurban lines in Michigan. Immediately following the purchase of the right-of-way, they began the actual grading of the road and construction of the Ottawa River bridge just north of Toledo.

From April to December 1901 the road was built from Toledo to Trenton, with trolley wires in place from Monroe to Trenton. Electric cars were tested a few times as far north as Rockwood. The line was still incomplete when its promoters got into serious financial difficulty. The Shore Line went into receivership, and in the summer of 1902 the receiver became convinced that it would never be viable as an electric road and petitioned the court to allow him to construct a connection from the end of the track at Trenton Junction (FN tower) to the nearby Detroit, Toledo & Ironton (Detroit Southern). This was completed in November 1902 and the construction work ceased for a short period.

In December 1902 the Grand Trunk Western and the Toledo, St Louis & Western (known as the Clover Leaf) entered into an agreement to jointly purchase the Shore Line property by issuing bonds for the payment of outstanding obligations. At the same time they contracted to extend the line northward from Trenton to a connection with the Wabash at River Rouge, on the south side of Detroit. The new owners intended to bring the Shore Line up to the same general standards as the Grand Trunk main line, a task that would require considerable additional track work.

When the line was completed, the D&TSL had no equipment except a small locomotive bought from the contractor and an old dummy saddle tank engine that had previously operated on the New York City elevated. They had some work equipment, including Rogers ballast cars, but no cabooses or freight cars. Only one station had been built—at Monroe—and there were just a few telephone shanties scattered along the route.

The overhead wire was removed and sold along with the electric motor cars to the Monroe Traction Company and the Toledo & Monroe Construction Company. The line was opened for freight traffic in September 1903, with each parent company furnishing three locomotives. The D&TSL used the Clover Leaf terminal in Toledo and the GTW facility in Detroit. There were no passing tracks, no classification yards and no locomotive servicing facilities. To reach the Clover Leaf yard in Toledo they used twelve miles (19 km) of the Toledo Terminal under a trackage rights agreement. In the spring of 1904 they bought six Baldwin compound Moguls along with six cabooses. Work began immediately to upgrade the right-of-way.

In 1906 a classification yard-named Lang Yard after the road's auditor was started just north of the Toledo city limits along with a roundhouse, turntable and machine shop. A short time later, work began on another yard at the other end of the railroad: Dearoad Yard was just south of the River Rouge at Detroit.

Over the years additional equipment was purchased and many improvements were made as the Shore Line developed into a vital and prosperous property. Ironically, for a road conceived as an interurban, the D&TSL never handled any passenger traffic, being operated for freight service only. In 1922 the Clover Leaf became part of the Van Sweringen's Nickel Plate, bringing its 50% interest in the D&TSL under the NKP banner.

Through service with the GTW was inaugurated in 1921, and until the early 1940s Shore Line power and crews operated through to Durand and Flint. They also operated through to Tunnel Yard in Port Huron until 1971.

== Motive power ==
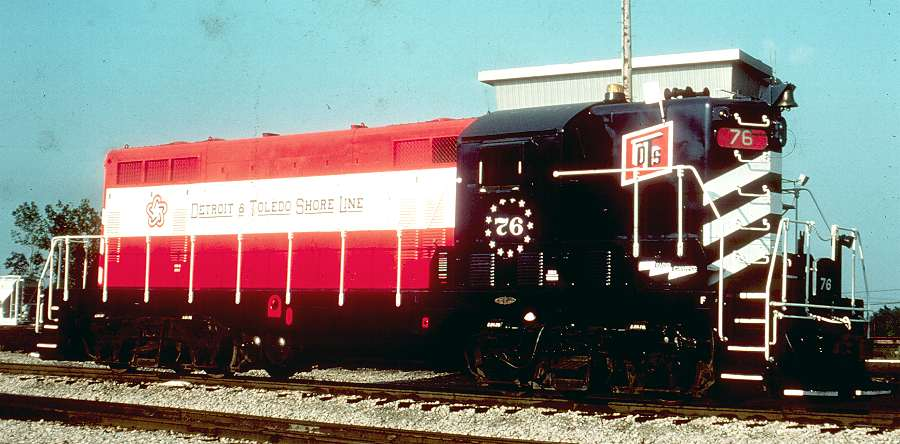
D&TSL GP7 46, renumbered 76 for the Bicentennial.

In the later days of steam the Shore Line operated with a modest fleet of Mikados, Consolidations, and switchers. It brought its first diesels, EMD SW7 switchers 116–118, in April 1950 and followed them with two EMD GP7s each in January, (41,42) and November (43,44) of 1951. A single SW9 (119) was also added in March 1951. Five more GP7s (45–49) were delivered in April 1952, and the last D&TSL steam locomotive operated in the fall of that year. Two more SW9s (120,121) were added in November 1952, and the Shore Line bought its last new locomotive, GP7 50, on February 12, 1953.

With a total fleet of 16 units made up of only three models of the same vintage from the same builder, the D&TSL shop forces had become quite expert in keeping them running, and the units were extremely well maintained. The three SW7s, which were not equipped for multiple-unit operations, were used on locals, transfers and "Bum Jobs" (extra yard assignments) while the SW9s generally would stay on the hump. The ten GP-7s handled some transfer and all road work. Since power for the road jobs was pooled with the Grand Trunk Western, colorful Geeps, GP38s and SD40s of that road were common sights on Shore Line road jobs and at the Lang Yard engine facility. For the Bicentennial, Shore Line 46 was renumbered 76 and repainted into a red, white and blue paint scheme.

== Bibliography ==
- Hilton, George W. & Due, John Fitzgerald (1960). The Electric Interurban Railways in America. Stanford, California: Stanford University Press. OCLC 237973.
- Geletzke, Charles H., Jr. (July 1981). "The Detroit & Toledo Shore Line". Railfan and Railroad.
- Geletzke, Charles H., Jr. (July 1981). "Steam on the Shore Line". Railfan and Railroad.
