= Ohio Terminal Railway =

Overview
- Reporting mark: OHIO
- Locale: Monroe County, Ohio
- Dates of operation: 2013–

Technical
- Track gauge: 4 ft 8 1/2 in (1,435 mm) standard gauge
- Length: 13 miles (21 km)

The Ohio Terminal Railway (reporting mark OHIO) is an American short-line railroad owned by Katahdin Rail Services that operates 13 miles (21 km) of track in Monroe County in the state of Ohio.

== Operations ==
The Ohio Terminal Railway line runs along the Ohio River in Monroe County, Ohio from Powhatan Point south to Hannibal, where it serves the Hannibal Industrial Park. The railroad interchanges with the Norfolk Southern Railway in Clarington.

The Ohio Terminal Railway is a subsidiary of Katahdin Rail Services.

== History ==
The tracks that the Ohio Terminal Railway operates on was originally a branch line of the Pennsylvania Railroad that served the Ormet aluminum plant in Hannibal. The line changed hands to Penn Central and then to Conrail. In 1996, Ormet Railroad Corporation took over operations of the line from Conrail. Hannibal Real Estate LLC bought a part of the plant site from Ormet in 2007 to establish the Hannibal Industrial Park and was given an easement over the railroad line. In April 2013, the Ohio Terminal Railway began operations on the line. On April 18, 2021, Katahdin Rail Services took over operations of the railroad from Carload Express.
