= Cincinnati and Muskingum Valley Railroad =

Railway line in Ohio, U.S.

Map

Cincinnati and Muskingum Valley Railroad was a railway line which ran from Trinway, Ohio, to Morrow, Ohio, and connected with the Steubenville and Indiana Railway at Trinway. The railroad depended on trackage rights with the Little Miami Railroad at Morrow to connect to Cincinnati. Built in 1866 by George Willison Adams, this railway was in operation until the 1970s. The C&MV merged with the Cleveland, Akron and Columbus Railroad in 1911. After the 1950s the line no longer carried passenger service but carried only freight.
