= Wheeling and Lake Erie Railway (1916–1988) =

American railway (1916–1988)

Overview
- Reporting mark: WLE
- Locale: Ohio, Pennsylvania, and West Virginia
- Dates of operation: 1877–1988
- Successor: Nickel Plate Road

Technical
- Track gauge: 4 ft 8 1/2 in (1,435 mm) standard gauge

The Wheeling and Lake Erie Railway (reporting mark WLE) was a Class I railroad mostly within the U.S. state of Ohio. It was leased to the New York, Chicago and St. Louis Railroad (Nickel Plate Road) in 1949, and merged into the Norfolk and Western Railway in 1988. A new regional railroad reused the Wheeling and Lake Erie Railway name in 1990 when it acquired most of the former W&LE from the N&W.

At the end of 1944, W&LE operated 507 miles of road and 1003 miles of track; that year it reported 2371 million net ton-miles of revenue freight and 0.002 million passenger-miles.

== History ==
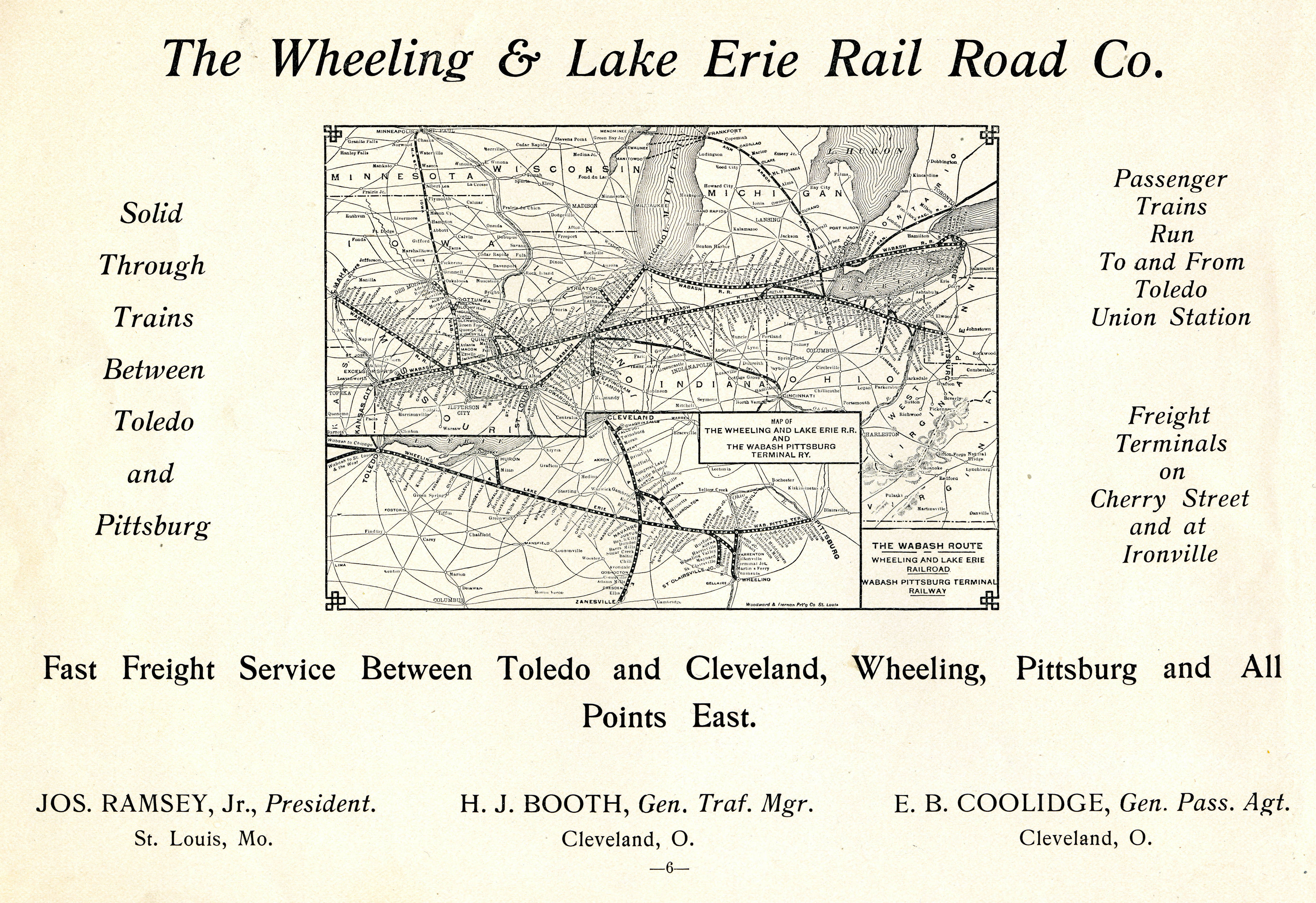
An advertisement for the then-Wabash-controlled Wheeling and Lake Erie Railroad from a book published in Toledo, Ohio in 1905

The Wheeling & Lake Erie's story begins with two different systems; one carrying the same name and another as a narrow-gauge linking Cleveland with Zanesville.

The first W&LE was incorporated on March 10, 1871 as the Wheeling & Lake Erie Rail Road Company. It was the vision of Joel Wood who believed a profitable enterprise lay in the transportation of coal from eastern Ohio mines to Lake Erie ports. The line was to be standard-gauge (4 feet, 8 1/2 inches) featuring grades no worse than 0.947% (or 50 feet to the mile). The initial leg would link Wheeling, West Virginia and Sandusky, Ohio while the ultimate goal was Toledo, Ohio. Wood's idea was sound but, unfortunately, ill-timed. To attain funding he tried to procure monetary support from major cities along the route. At first, Wheeling promised $300,000 but a disgruntled taxpayer was successful in having the ordinance rescinded in 1871. Then, the Panic of 1873 ended any hopes of either Sandusky or Toledo providing assistance. In the end, Wood's proposal only saw a bit of grading completed (including three tunnels) between Navarre and Martins Ferry (across the Ohio River from Wheeling). As the W&LE lay mired in uncertainty he was ousted by fellow associates who wanted to scrap the original plans in a favor of a three-foot, narrow-gauge system. These gained widespread popularity after the Denver & Rio Grande successfully demonstrated their viability in the 1870's as a cheaper alternative to their standard-gauge counterparts. The belief was that such a national network would yield greater returns on investment. This new undertaking began at the northern end when W&LE officials acquired the defunct Milan Canal's tow path.

With a right-of-way ready for rails the first 12.5 miles between Huron and Norwalk opened during June 1877. While more grading was completed around New London and to the south (totaling 37 miles), the original W&LE was an utter failure. Before shutting down in late 1879 the group was successful in converting the Huron-Norwalk segment to standard-gauge. In the meantime, another much more successful three-footer, which went on to become part of the modern W&LE, had been launched nearby. It too, however, got off to a shaky start.

It was promoted by General E.R. Eckley who had similar ambitions to Joel Wood. He incorporated the Ohio & Toledo Rail Road (O&T) on May 7, 1872 to move coal from eastern Ohio mines to Lake Erie. Instead of building from the Wheeling area, however, this pike would sought a point slightly north at Wellsville, Ohio. With insufficient capital and an insistence to utilize shoddy construction standards his entire plan may have ended at the drawing board if it were not for the moribund 4-foot, 10-inch Carrollton & Oneida Railroad (C&O). Built to even poorer standards than the typical narrow-gauge, the C&O, with a history tracing back to 1837, linked its namesake towns along a 10-mile line laid with strap-iron rail. At Oneida, it interchanged with the Cleveland & Pittsburgh (a PRR subsidiary). During its brief time in service it was a hopeless failure. The operation was so bad, in fact, it was returned to its creditors in 1859 and deemed unsafe for steam locomotives. With no capital it limped along for the next seven years as a local, mule-powered operation. On February 26, 1866 it was reorganized as the Carrollton & Oneida whereupon some capital improvements allowed steam-powered service to return. Things remained this way until Carrollton sold the railroad to Eckley for $1 on July 15, 1873. He integrated it into his O&T system and made further upgrades, such as laying solid iron T-rail (3-foot gauge) and extending service to Minerva during 1874.

After giving up on a Toledo route the general decided upon a Youngstown connection where interchange could be established with another narrow-gauge, the Painesville & Youngstown. Following yet another change of heart, Eckley scrapped the Youngstown idea and, instead, would aim for Painesville. Incorporated as the Painesville, Canton & Bridgeport Narrow Gauge Rail Road on January 12, 1875 it began construction from Chagrin Falls. Without the necessary funding, Eckley managed only to reach Solon (5.15 miles) by November 1877 before money ran out. His venture then passed into Dr. Norman Smith's hands who incorporated the Youngstown & Connotton Valley (Y&CV) on August 29, 1877. Eckley initially remained president but after a dispute broke out between the two (regarding the northern terminus) the O&T was sold to creditor Cleveland Iron Company. It then awarded Smith the property in 1878 and Eckley's involvement ended. Just a year later, on October 20, 1879, Smith renamed the company as the Conotton Valley Railroad (CVRR) and completed an extension of the old O&T to Canton in early May 1880. His greatest achievement, from an historical perspective, was acquiring solid financial backing for the venture through a Massachusetts syndicate which aimed to develop the CVRR into one of Ohio's most successful narrow-gauges.

To a greater extent they actually accomplished this feat, pouring some $2.6 million into the railroad and completing the entirety of the future Wheeling & Lake Erie's Cleveland - Zanesville corridor. Upon arriving, they quickly scrapped the Painesville idea and instead sought a direct entry into Cleveland. Construction began on July 5, 1880 and passenger service into downtown Cleveland was inaugurated on February 21, 1882. As George Hilton points out in his book, "American Narrow Gauge Railroads," while this was ongoing the railroad built a short, 8.7-mile extension south of Carrollton to reach coal mines in the Sherrodsville area that opened on January 1, 1882 (it was later abandoned in 1936).

With a well-built right-of-way now capable of supporting relatively heavy traffic the CVRR next focused on a line due south from Canton. What was built as the Connotton Valley & Straitsville Railroad would extend to New Straitsville via Zanesville and Coshocton in pursuit of the Perry County coalfields. Work got underway in June 1882 and had reached Coshocton (114.7 miles) almost exactly one year later in June 1883. The group attempted to gather financing for the final push into Zanesville but managed only to secure around $300,000, less than half the amount needed (this money was later used to construct a beautiful, two-story passenger terminal in Cleveland which opened on August 29, 1883).

Despite relatively strong business (in 1884 it carried 456,627 passengers, moved 192,400 tons of coal, and handled 41,668 tons of other freight) the company's heavy debt resulted in receivership during June 1883. On May 9, 1885 it was reorganized as the Cleveland & Canton Railroad (C&C) and eventually managed to raise $1.7 million to convert the entire property to standard-gauge, a process completed on November 18, 1888. The C&C finished the 29-mile line to Zanesville but never made it into Perry County.

Another name change took place in 1892 as the Cleveland, Canton & Southern Railroad (CC&S) but it was again in receivership within a year. The Wheeling & Lake Erie went on to purchase the CC&S for $3.85 million on August 5, 1899. Gould, arguably the most hated man in America at the time, had big ambitions in which the W&LE would play a vital role. By the 1880's his aspirations for a true, coast-to-coast transcontinental railroad was nearing reality. The Wabash was the Midwestern component of this network and from its eastern terminus at Toledo offered a potential connection with the W&LE. The latter's charter stipulated it could build from that point towards the Ohio River in a southeasterly direction. Using the W&LE, Gould would connect it with the New York, Pennsylvania & Ohio (Erie) at Creston for through service into Youngstown. He then only needed 70 miles of new construction to reach the Pennsylvania-controlled Allegheny Valley Railroad. This system ran across the Keystone State and connected with the Central Railroad of New Jersey, another Gould interest.

During late 1880, he formally acquired the defunct W&LE and by early 1881 things got underway. Actual construction commenced east and west of Creston and by November 1881 the line was finished from Massillon to Norwalk/Huron. It eventually completed a route connecting Pittsburgh, PA (Rook) and Toledo, Ohio. Most freight traffic on the line was coal and iron ore, with general merchandise also making up a significant portion.

Service from Huron to Massillion, Ohio was opened on January 9, 1882 and new lines were constructed that eventually reached the Ohio River and Toledo. The WLE also developed new docks on Lake Erie at Huron that opened May 21, 1884 when the first cargo of iron ore was received. In 1880 another 3-foot narrow gauge line, the Connotton Valley Railway, was formed; building north from Canton, Ohio to Cleveland and then south to Coshocton, Ohio and Zanesville. The Connotton Valley became the Cleveland, Canton & Southern Railroad and was converted to standard gauge in one day on November 18, 1888. The Cleveland, Canton & Southern Railroad joined the WLE in 1899 after its purchase at a foreclosure sale, becoming WLE's Cleveland Division.

At its height, the W&LE ran from the Pittsburgh region (through a connection with the Wabash-Pittsburgh Terminal, later the Pittsburgh and West Virginia Railway) to Lake Erie at Huron and Toledo. However, the mainlines of the WLE never reached outside Ohio's borders - Pennsylvania access was only via the Pittsburgh and West Virginia. It also ran from Cleveland to Zanesville, with the lines crossing at Harmon, just east of Brewster, Ohio, which became the location of WLE's corporate headquarters and locomotive shops. Brewster began serving as headquarters of the Wheeling and Lake Erie Railway in 1914. With two busy main stems crossing on the map of Ohio; the road's nickname for many years was "The Iron Cross." Ironically, the mainline of the W&LE never actually reached Wheeling, West Virginia. However, a branch between Steubenville, Ohio and Martins Ferry was completed in 1891, which led to an indirect connection to Wheeling via a subsidiary, the Wheeling Bridge and Terminal Company.

The W&LE began producing locomotives at its Brewster, Ohio shops in 1910, and boasted one of the finest locomotive producing facilities in the country. Over the years, the W&LE built and rolled boilers and erected fifty of their own steam engines, a feat never tried by many larger and more famous railroads. The Wheeling & Lake Erie was jokingly called the "Wailing and Leg Weary" but, after several early financial embarrassments, finally found prosperity in its later life.

Passenger service ended in 1940 just before the start of World War II.

=== Nickel Plate Road, Norfolk and Western, and Norfolk Southern Ownership (1949–1998) ===
In 1949, the New York, Chicago, & St. Louis Railroad, or Nickel Plate Road (NKP) as it was known, leased the W&LE. The W&LE was operated as the "Wheeling and Lake Erie District" of the NKP. In 1964, the Nickel Plate combined with the Norfolk and Western Railway (N&W), bringing the W&LE into N&W and, after the N&W-Southern Railway merger, Norfolk Southern. Throughout this period, the railroad generally remained unchanged.

In 1988, the W&LE was finally consolidated into the Norfolk and Western on September 20. The New York Stock Exchange removed the trading stock the following Friday, the 23rd.

=== Wheeling and Lake Erie Railway (1990–Present) ===
In 1990, many lines were sold by Norfolk Southern to the newly-founded Wheeling and Lake Erie Railway. It has since become a Class II railroad, and the largest railroad based in the state of Ohio.

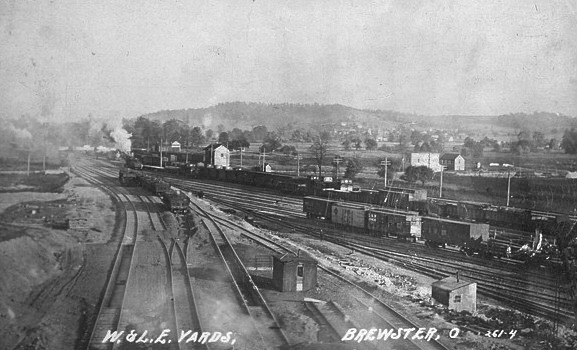
The railroad's Brewster, Ohio, yards in 1910.
