= Lorain, Ashland and Southern Railroad =

Map

The Lorain, Ashland, and Southern Railroad (reporting mark LA&S) operated from 1914 to 1925 between Lorain, Ohio, and Custaloga, Ohio. It was a consolidation of the Ashland and Western Railway and the Lorain and Ashland Railroad. The line was purchased in 1916 by the Pennsylvania Railroad and the Erie Railroad as a means to access the National Tube Company steel mill in South Lorain, Ohio.

The original rail line, known as the Millersburg, Jeromeville, and Greenwich Railroad, was constructed in 1894–1895 between Brown's Junction, Ohio, and Jeromeville, Ohio, by Horace B. Camp, a brick manufacturer from Akron, Ohio. He built a brick and tile plant near Horace and used the railroad to ship his finished products to customers throughout Ohio and New York.

In 1898–1899 the Ashland and Wooster Railway Company extended the line to Ashland, Ohio, where it built a large freight and passenger depot and served many large industries in that city.

Horace Camp sold the railroad to Charles W. French in 1903 and the name of the company changed to the Lake and River Railroad, a subsidiary of the Chicago Short Line Railway. After several years of financial difficulties, the line went into receivership and was eventually purchased by Zebulon W. Davis of Canton, Ohio.

In 1907 the Ashland and Western Railway was sold to former Wabash Railroad president Joseph Ramsey, Jr. Ramsey had constructed the Lorain and Ashland Railroad between Wellington, Ohio, and Lorain, Ohio. This line fell into disrepair and it was not until 1913 that the entire system was refurbished and a connector between Ashland and Wellington was completed in 1914.

Because of railroad consolidations, poor condition of the rail line, competition from the Lorain and West Virginia Railroad, and corporate manipulations, the Lorain, Ashland, and Southern Railroad was abandoned in August 1925.
