= Toledo and Ohio Central Railway =

American railway company

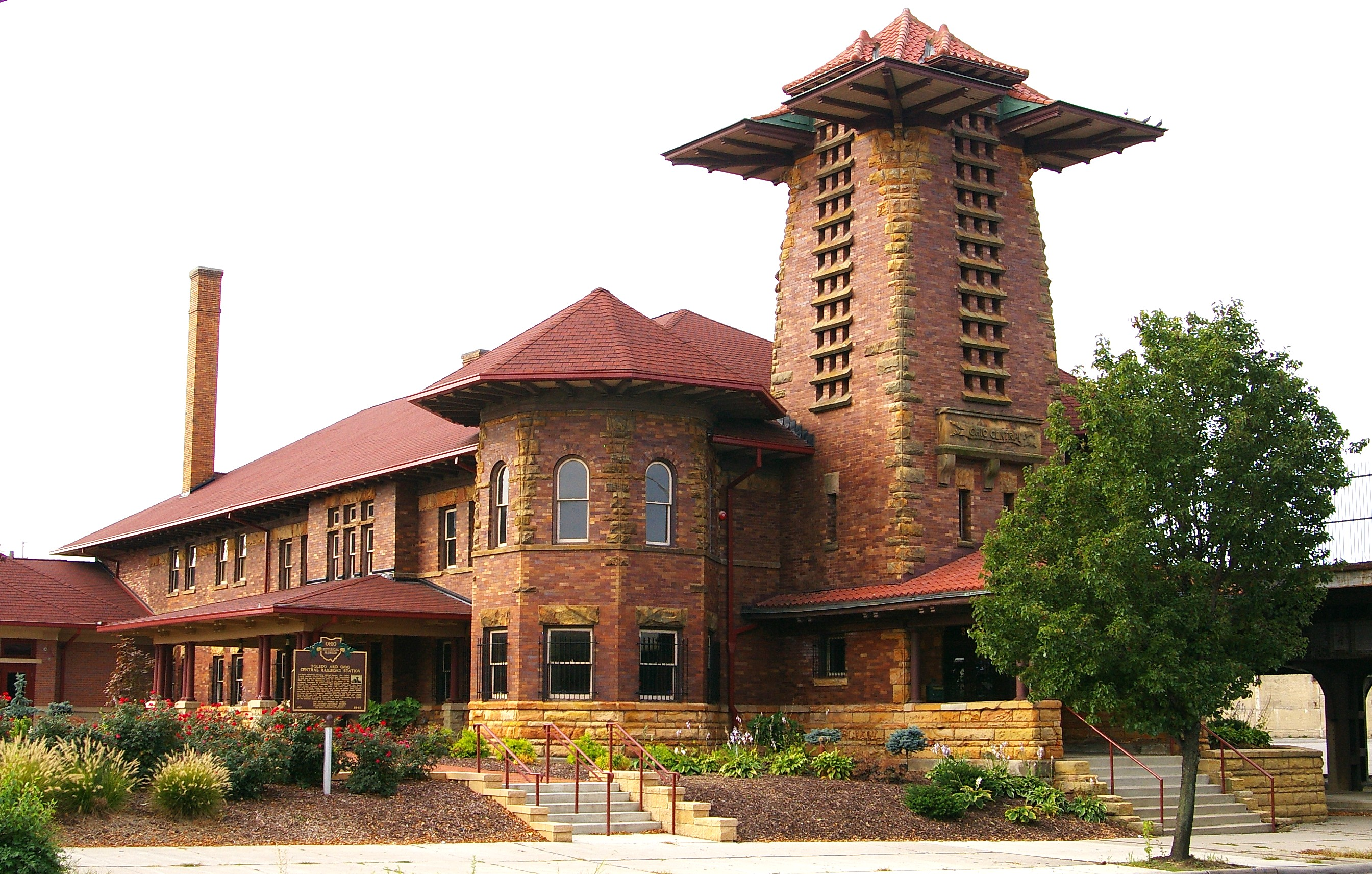
- Former station at Columbus, Ohio

Overview
- Dates of operation: 1885–1952
- Successor: New York Central Railroad

The Toledo and Ohio Central Railway (T&OC) was a railway company in the U.S. state of Ohio from 1885 to 1952. In 1928 it was leased by the New York Central System, which purchased the line in 1938.

== Precursors ==
- Atlantic & Lake Erie Railroad
- Atlantic & Northwestern Railroad
- Ohio Central Railroad
  - Columbus & Sunday Creek Valley Railroad
    - Ohio Central Railway
- Zanesville & Western Railroad
