= Ohio Central Railroad (1988) =

Overview
- Reporting mark: OHCR
- Locale: Ohio
- Dates of operation: 1988–present

Technical
- Track gauge: 4 ft 8 1/2 in (1,435 mm) standard gauge

The Ohio Central Railroad (reporting mark OHCR) is a part of the Ohio Central Railroad System, operating a former Wheeling & Lake Erie Railway line between Warwick and Zanesville, Ohio, United States. Operations began in 1988. It has several connections with tracks on which CSX has trackage rights.

The company was acquired by Genesee & Wyoming in 2008 as part of its purchase of the Ohio Central Railroad System.

== Gallery ==
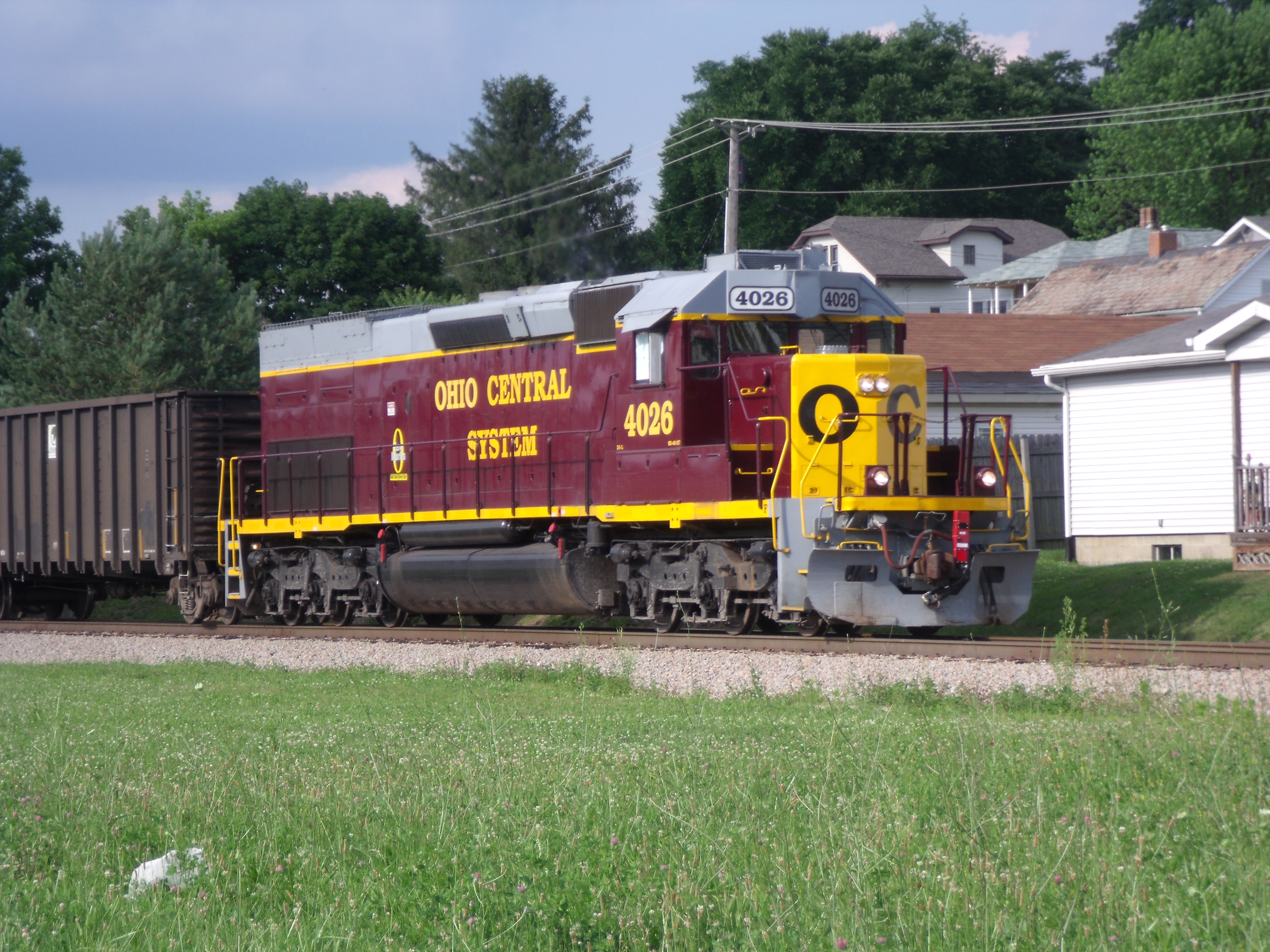
An Ohio Central EMD SD40T-2 in South Zanesville in 2009

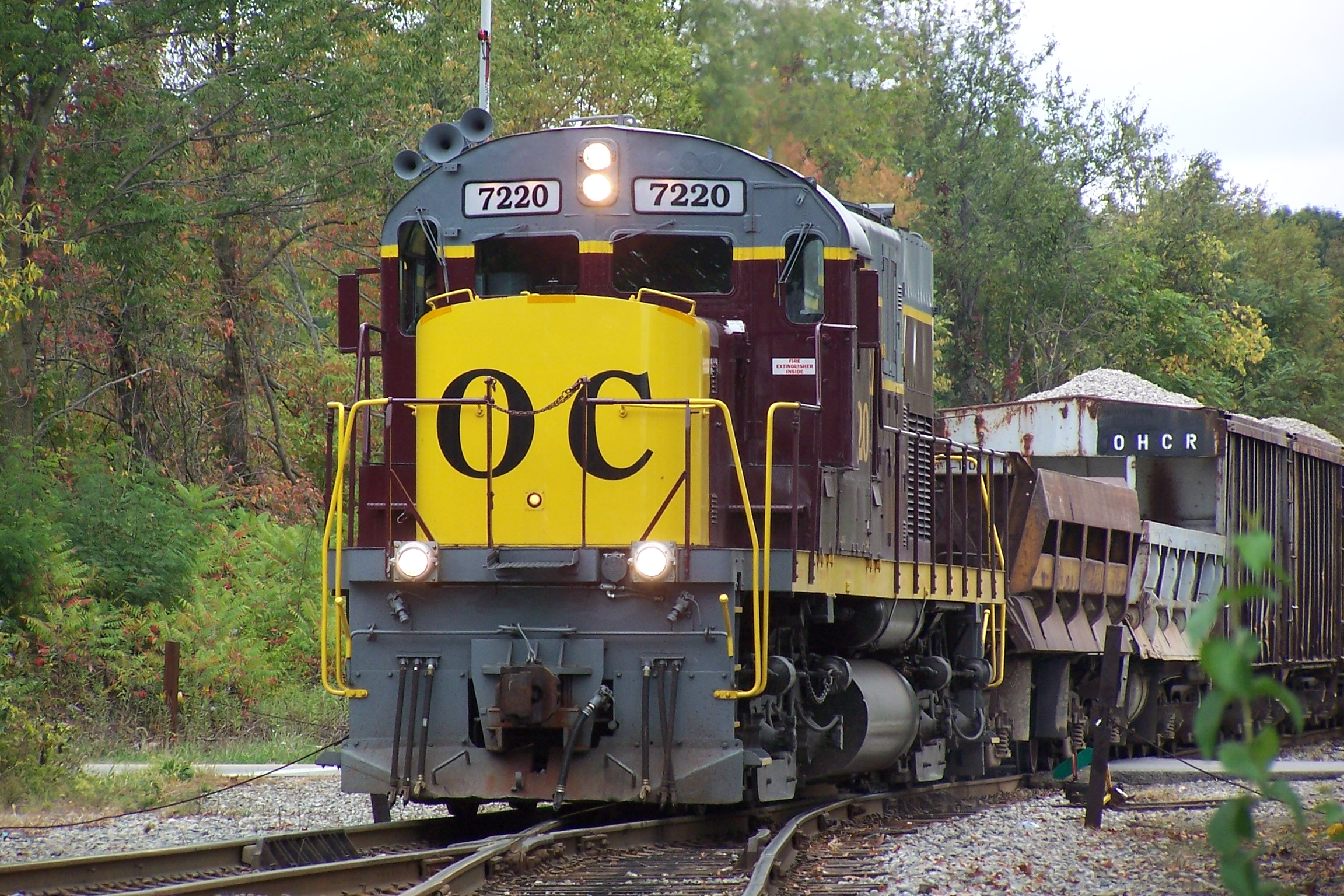
An Ohio Central Alco Century 420 at the head end of a ballast train in Blacklick, Ohio in 2007
