= Akron, Canton and Youngstown Railroad =

Class I railroad which operated in Ohio

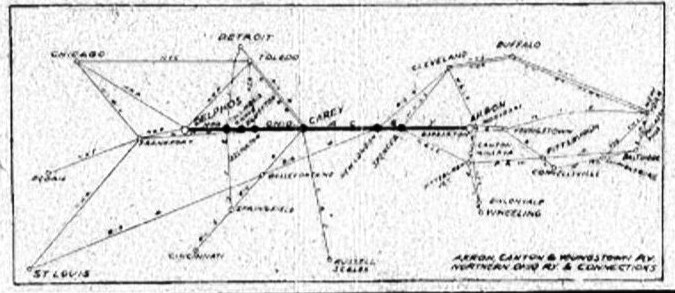

Overview
- Headquarters: Akron, Ohio
- Reporting mark: ACY
- Locale: Ohio
- Dates of operation: 1907–1982
- Successor: Norfolk and Western Railway

Technical
- Track gauge: 4 ft 8 1/2 in (1,435 mm)
- Length: 171 miles (275 km)

The Akron, Canton and Youngstown Railroad (reporting mark ACY) was a Class I railroad which operated in the state of Ohio. The company was founded in 1907 and opened its mainline between Mogadore and Akron, Ohio in 1912. Later reclassified as a short-line railroad, the company was bought by the Norfolk and Western Railway in 1964 and merged in 1982. Despite the name, the company served neither Canton nor Youngstown.

== History ==
The company was founded in 1907 as the Akron, Canton and Youngstown Railway and in 1912 completed a 9.5-mile (15.3 km) line from Mogadore to Akron. Effective March 1, 1920, the AC&Y leased the Northern Ohio Railway, an Akron–Delphos, Ohio line that had been part of the New York Central Railroad system via the Lake Erie and Western Railroad. The ACY and the Northern Ohio were merged on January 14, 1944, into the Akron, Canton and Youngstown Railroad. On October 16, 1964, the Norfolk and Western Railway (N&W) acquired control of the AC&Y, though it continued to operate separately until it was merged on January 1, 1982.

== Passenger service ==
The ACY was primarily a freight railroad and passenger service was limited. Between 1920 and 1922 the company operated three motorcars. The last passenger trains were mixed trains between Akron and Delphos which stopped running on July 20, 1951. During the motorcar period the company ran a commuter service between Mogadore and Copley, Ohio.

== Route ==
The combined ACY-Northern Ohio system ran from Delphos to Akron, a distance of 171 miles (275 km). Despite various plans the railroad never extended to Canton nor Youngstown. The N&W spun-off the former ACY to the new Wheeling and Lake Erie Railway in 1990. The segment between Mogadore and Carey, Ohio, remains in service.
