= Pennsylvania, Ohio and Detroit Railroad =

Overview
- Locale: Ohio and Michigan

Technical
- Track gauge: 4 ft 8 1/2 in (1,435 mm) standard gauge

The Pennsylvania, Ohio and Detroit Railroad was a railroad company in the U.S. states of Ohio and Michigan that existed from 1926 (100 years ago) to 1956 (70 years ago). Its sole purpose was to simplify the corporate structure of the Pennsylvania Railroad by merging subsidiaries into a common company leased to the PRR; the PO&D was merged into the Connecting Railway in 1956.

== History ==
The PO&D was formed on January 1, 1926 by the consolidation of the following companies:

- Cincinnati, Lebanon and Northern Railway, Cincinnati to Dayton; leased to PRR since 1921
- Cleveland, Akron and Cincinnati Railway, Cleveland to Columbus and Cincinnati; leased to PRR affiliates since 1912
- Manufacturers Railway, Toledo; not leased to PRR before the consolidation
- Pennsylvania-Detroit Railroad, Toledo to Detroit; leased to PRR since 1923
- Toledo, Columbus and Ohio River Railroad, Toledo to Marietta and Sandusky to Columbus; leased to PRR affiliates since 1900

The PO&D bought part of the Ohio River and Western Railway, from Zanesville to Lawton, on December 7, 1928; this had been operated by the PRR since 1924. On May 31, 1956, the PO&D was merged into the Connecting Railway to further simplify the corporate structure.
