= Cleveland Foundation Centennial Lake Link Trail =

Trail in Cleveland, Ohio, United States

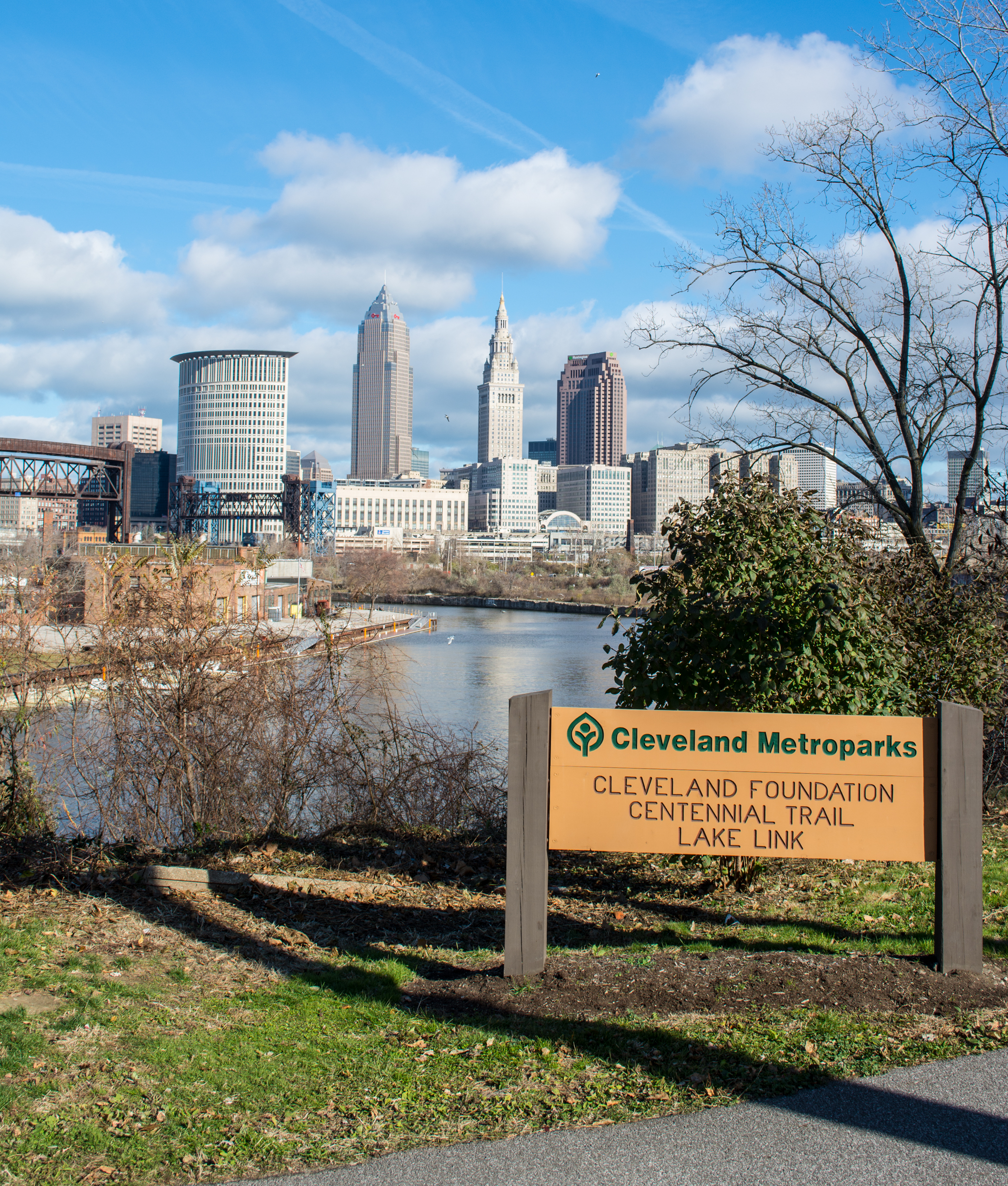
- Length: 1.3 miles (2.1 km)
- Location: Cleveland, Ohio, U.S.
- Established: August 13, 2015
- Trailheads: Northern terminus: Whiskey Island; Southern terminus: Northern terminus of the Ohio and Erie Canal Towpath Trail
- Use: Bicycling, hiking, walking
- Difficulty: Easy (Note: At its steepest, the grade is less than 1.1.)
- Season: Year-round
- Sights: Cuyahoga River, downtown Cleveland skyline
- Surface: Asphalt
- Right of way: Former Cleveland and Mahoning Valley Railroad
- Maintained by: Cleveland Metroparks
- Website: clevelandmetroparks.com

The Cleveland Foundation Centennial Lake Link Trail, originally known as the Lake Link Trail, is a cycling, hiking, and walking trail located in the city of Cleveland, Ohio, in the United States. Owned by the city of Cleveland and maintained by Cleveland Metroparks, the trail runs along the former track bed of the Cleveland and Mahoning Valley Railroad. The trail is named for The Cleveland Foundation, a local community foundation which donated $5 million toward the trail's construction. The southern leg of the 1.3-mile (2.1 km) trail opened in August 2015, and the northern leg in August 2017. The middle leg will begin construction once the Irishtown Bend hillside is stabilized. A bridge connecting the trail to Whiskey Island will begin construction in Spring 2019 and will be completed in early Summer 2020.

== Railroad and associated infrastructure ==
The Cleveland and Mahoning Railroad (C&M; later the Cleveland and Mahoning Valley Railroad) was founded in 1848 and authorized to build a line from Cleveland to Warren, Ohio, and then into Pennsylvania. The railroad intended to connect with the Cleveland, Columbus and Cincinnati Railroad on the Lake Erie shore in Cleveland. This required crossing from the east to west bank of the Cuyahoga River, but a crossing was not immediately constructed. This left the tracks ending near Kingsbury Run on the east bank of the river. The Atlantic and Great Western Railroad leased the C&M in July 1863, and agreed to complete the line. Work on a new passenger depot on the Scranton Flats began in August 1863, and the tracks over the river to the new depot were completed on November 4.

In March 1880, the Atlantic & Great Western emerged from bankruptcy as a new company, the New York, Pennsylvania and Ohio Railroad (NYP&O). In the spring of 1886, the NYP&O extended the tracks in Cleveland by crossing the western part of the Scranton Flats, curving around Irishtown Bend, and crossing "the Angle" (the next peninsula) to bridge the Old Ship Channel of the Cuyahoga River and reach Whiskey Island and the Cleveland, Columbus and Cincinnati Railroad. Trains began running July 4. Docks and a freight depot were built on either side of Columbus Road on Irishtown Bend. The NYP&O's rail yards extended for nearly 2 miles (3.2 km) along the southwest bank of the Old Ship Channel, around Irishtown Bend, and through Tremont. More docks were built just north of where the tracks curved westward to pass under the Superior Viaduct.

The railroad built a new, steam-operated dock and coal tipple in 1912 at what is now the western abutment of the Detroit-Superior Bridge. Traffic along the Cuyahoga River in this area was so extensive, the C&M had a rail yard eight tracks wide along Irishtown Bend to accommodate it. In 1914, construction began on the Detroit-Superior Bridge at the north end of Irishtown Bend. The railroad dock was moved 200 feet (61 m) upstream in 1917 to accommodate construction of the western abutments of the bridge, and the railroad tracks routed to run beneath one of the bridge's arches.

=== Track removal and track bed sales ===
In 1982, Conrail (the successor to the C&M) removed 3.3 miles (5.3 km) of track in Cleveland, from the terminus on Whiskey Island to the Von Willer Yard (at E. 93rd Street and Harvard Avenue).

A portion of the track was lost to road construction. Riverbed Street was a single-lane road running parallel to the most inland of the old C&M tracks on Irishtown Bend. The road was widened to two lanes in 1985, with the new eastern lane covering the main line of the former C&M track.

In July 1993, Conrail sold the 35-acre (140,000 m^{2}) former C&M rail yard on Whiskey Island to Whiskey Island Partners, a real estate development corporation, for $1.6 million ($3,600,000 in 2025 dollars). The private company spent $300,000 moving Conrail's track off the island. In December 2004, Cuyahoga County purchased this land, as well as the rest of Whiskey Island, for $6.25 million ($10,700,000 in 2025 dollars). The county used most of the peninsula to create Wendy Park.

The track bed from the south bank of the Old Ship Channel to the Cuyahoga River opposite Kingsbury Run was sold to Westbank Development Corp., a for-profit company founded by local real estate investor Earl Walker. (Note: It is unclear when Westbank Development obtained title to the track bed, or from whom.)

== Creating the trail ==
=== Genesis of the trail idea ===
In 1987, Dr. Alfred M. Lee, an archeologist at the Cleveland Museum of Natural History, began a three-year-long series of archeological digs at Irishtown Bend. The 6.3-acre (25,000 m^{2}) dig site covered 80 former residential lots between Riverbed Street, Franklin Avenue, Columbus Road, and the no longer extant Russia Street. The dig uncovered extensive evidence regarding the type of structures built in the neighborhood and the economics, foodways, living conditions, and social status of those living in the area.

The archeological digs generated interest in preserving the site and making it accessible to the public. A study of this and other preservation issues along the Cuyahoga River valley was funded in 1990 by BP America, The Cleveland Foundation, and The George Gund Foundation. After two years of work by six governmental planning agencies, the Cuyahoga County Planning Commission released a report in April 1992 that recommended an 18-mile (29 km) series of parks, protected areas, trails, and other new infrastructure to connect Lake Erie with the Cuyahoga Valley National Park to the south of Cleveland. Regarding Irishtown Bend, the report advocated a biking and hiking trail to link the area with Whiskey Island to the north and the Ohio and Erie Canal Towpath Trail in the south. The study also recommended funding for additional archaeological digs at the Bend. Although businesses located further south on the west bank of the Cuyahoga River wanted a new, four-lane "West Bank connector" road through Irishtown Bend that would give them faster access to local highways, Cleveland planners (updating the city's Civic Vision master plan) instead began planning to turn Riverbed Street into a biking-hiking path and converting the area into a public park.

=== Irishtown Bend stability issues ===
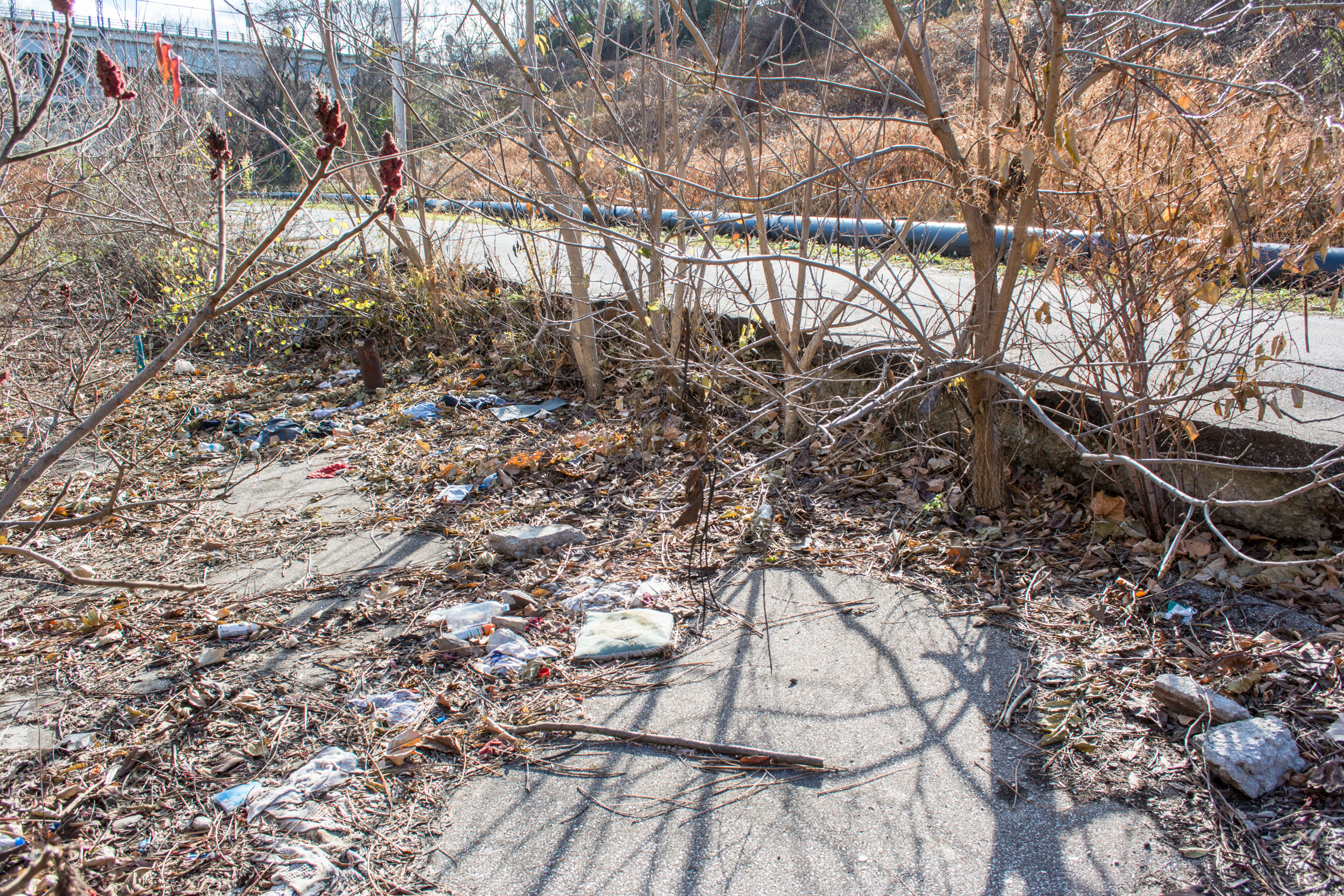
Near Columbus Road, half of Riverbed Street has subsided several feet due to geologic instability.

The west bank of the Cuyahoga River at Irishtown Bend has been noticeably unstable since the late 1880s. Soil, geology, the steepness of the hill, and water in the soil work together to push soil into the river until equilibrium is reached. Generally speaking, the slide has been extremely slow, at most a few inches a year. At times it may even be dormant. When the soil is particularly wet or pressure is put on it from above (by adding new fill dirt or by constructing buildings on the soil), the hillside can slip as much as several feet a year.

About 2004 or 2005, the Irishtown Bend hill began to subside at a significantly higher rate. In November 2005, major cracks appeared in Riverbed Street. The city repaved the street in January 2006, major cracks reappeared only two weeks later. The city ordered the street closed as a safety measure. Cleveland and Northeast Ohio Regional Sewer District (NEORSD) officials began a series of meetings with the United States Army Corps of Engineers, Ohio Department of Transportation (ODOT), and United States Coast Guard to discussion options. Four technical studies predicted that the slippage would only worsen. The Corps began studying the hillside more extensively in 2007 and 2008, and issued a report in January 2009 which concluded that a very real danger existed of the Irishtown Bend hill collapsing suddenly into the Cuyahoga River.

With the instability of the Irishtown Bend making it increasingly clear that the area should not be used for residences or industry, the city of Cleveland, Cuyahoga County, several nonprofit organizations, and landowners at Irishtown Bend began parallel discussions in 2006 about the future of the area and the abandoned C&M railroad track bed. The George Gund Foundation assisted these talks by contributing a $740,000 ($1,200,000 in 2025 dollars) planning grant. In January 2009, these groups issued a report, the "Flats Connections Plan". ParkWorks, a Cleveland nonprofit, (Note: Now known as LAND Studio, ParkWorks is a local Cleveland nonprofit whose mission is to turn former industrial spaces into parks and public amenities.) wrote one part of the plan, which advocated turning the abandoned track bed between Kingsbury Run and Whiskey Island into a biking-hiking trail. The plan also included the construction of a new pedestrian bridge over the Old Ship Channel of the Cuyahoga River to reconnect the tracks with the old C&M rail yard (now part of Wendy Park). CMG Landscape Architecture, a San Francisco-based landscape architecture firm, authored the remainder of the plan, which proposed converting Irishtown Bend into park, playground, and wetlands.

=== Buying land and designing the trail ===
Negotiations to obtain title to the C&M trackbed began in 2008. The Trust for Public Land (TPL), a national nonprofit which coordinates and facilities the creation of parkland, negotiated on behalf of the group with Westbank Development Corp. On December 28, 2009, TPL purchased for $3.2 million ($4,800,000 in 2025 dollars) title and an easement covering 1.3 miles (2.1 km) of former C&M trackbed between the Old Ship Channel and the Cuyahoga River near Kingsbury Run. (Note: According to The Trust for Public Land, 3.23 acres (13,100 m^{2}) of the 4.98 acres (20,200 m^{2}) of the property (about 64.9 percent of the total) were purchased outright. The easement covered the remaining 1.75 acres (7,100 m^{2}). The easement was critical to the deal, for it prevented Westbank Development, ParkWorks, and their successors or assigns, from using the trail for anything other than a recreational trail (and associated facilities), environmental conservation, or storm water drainage.) Westbank Development donated $2 million ($3,000,000 in 2025 dollars) worth of the purchase price to ParkWorks. ParkWorks provided the rest of the purchase price after receiving a $1.2 million ($1,800,000 in 2025 dollars) grant from the Clean Ohio Conservation Fund. (Note: The Clean Ohio grant was released only after ParkWorks was able to verify that the land was free from environmental contamination.)

Initial design work for what was then called the Lake Link Trail was funded by a $215,000 ($300,000 in 2025 dollars) grant from The George Gund Foundation. ParkWorks used the money to hire design and engineering consultants, complete an initial design, make cost estimates, and identify funding sources.

On November 7, 2011, The George Gund Foundation gave $2 million ($2,900,000 in 2025 dollars) to the project, and The Cleveland Foundation followed up in August 2014 with a $5 million ($6,800,000 in 2025 dollars) gift. In honor of the latter donation, Cleveland Metroparks, designer, builder, and eventual maintainer of the trail, said the path would be renamed the Cleveland Foundation Centennial Lake Link Trail.

=== Construction ===
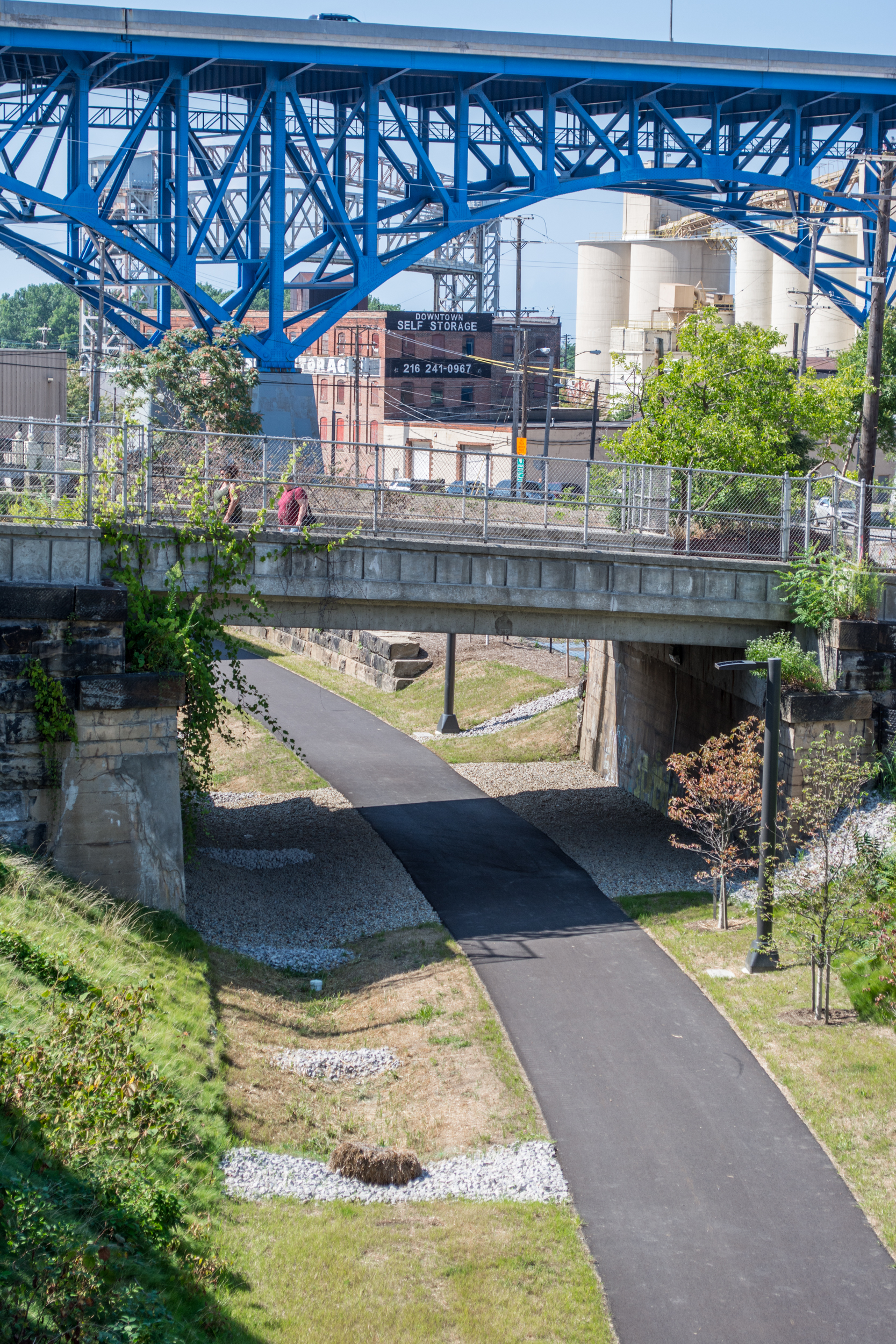
Looking north from Washington Avenue at the north leg of the trail.

By fall of 2014, the trail design effort by Cleveland Metroparks was nearing completion, land clearance had begun, and about $8 million ($10,900,000 in 2025 dollars) trail and bridge construction costs had been raised. Cleveland Metroparks said it would build the trail in four stages. The first stage would be across the Scranton Peninsula, from Scranton Road to Columbus Road. The federal government awarded a $3.3 million grant for trail construction in January 2015.

The Cleveland-Cuyahoga County Port Authority took the lead in identifying a solution for stabilizing the soil at Irishtown Bend. In February 2015, the long-awaited Port Authority report was released. The study was conducted by the firm of Barr and Prevost and took 17 months at a cost of $282,000 ($400,000 in 2025 dollars). Barr and Prevost recommended that Metroparks delay building the Cleveland Foundation Centennial Lake Link Trail along Irishtown Bend until the hillside stabilization issues had been identified and a permanent solution implemented.

The 0.25-mile (0.40 km) south leg of the Cleveland Foundation Centennial Lake Link Trail opened on August 13, 2015. The dedication was attended by United States Secretary of the Interior Sally Jewell.

In June 2016, the Northeast Ohio Areawide Coordinating Agency (NOACA) made an $80,000 ($100,000 in 2025 dollars) grant to Cleveland Metroparks to enable it to begin planning for hillside stabilization and the creation of the park and middle section of the trail. Cleveland Metroparks won an $850,000 ($1,100,000 in 2025 dollars) Clean Ohio grant in October 2016 to cover construction, design, and engineering costs of the Cleveland Foundation Centennial Lake Link Trail.

Cleveland Metroparks began construction on the northern section of the Cleveland Foundation Centennial Lake Link Trail in August 2016. The track bed, large portions of which were in a cut below street level, had been partially filled by illegal dumping, and the portion under Main Avenue was under water. As construction began, Ohio City Inc. (a nonprofit community development corporation) led the city of Cleveland, the Cleveland-Cuyahoga County Port Authority, and LAND Studio in a $125,000 ($200,000 in 2025 dollars) planning effort to begin the work of designing the park and the trail that would run through it. (Note: This planning study relied, in part, on the prior $80,000 grant from NOACA as well as a $25,000 ($33,538 in 2025 dollars) donation from the Joseph and Nancy Keithley Foundation and $10,000 ($13,415 in 2025 dollars) each from Ohio City Inc. and the Port Authority.)

The second segment of the Cleveland Foundation Centennial Lake Link Trail opened on June 9, 2017.

The proposed park design was submitted to the Cleveland Planning Commission on September 1, 2017. The park, and the middle leg of the Cleveland Foundation Centennial Lake Link Trail, remain on hold pending approval of the design and the securing of funds for hillside stabilization.

=== Old Ship Channel bridge ===
The Cuyahoga County Planning Commission initially supervised planning for the pedestrian bridge linking the trail to Whiskey Island. (Note: When or why the planning commission took over this aspect of the project is unclear.) The county received a $159,000 ($200,000 in 2025 dollars) federal grant and $80,000 ($100,000 in 2025 dollars) in private contributions to plan the bridge, and by June 2011 was considering three designs by architect Miguel Rosales: A traditional suspension bridge, a Fink truss bridge, and a cable-stayed bridge with curving beams overhead. (Note: It is unclear by what process the planning commission decided to hire Rosales, or when he began work.)

Cleveland Metroparks took over the bridge planning effort in the fall of 2014. Not using the bridge design work previously conducted by the Cuyahoga County Planning Commission, Metroparks began soliciting new designs for the 600-foot (180 m) pedestrian and bicycle bridge over the Old Ship Channel. By October 2014, four bridge design teams had been selected as finalists: Columbus-based DLZ/Paris-based RFR Engineers; Elyria-based KS Associates/Parsons Brinckerhoff; Pittsburgh-based Michael Baker International/Skip Smallridge; Miguel Rosales/Schlaich Bergermann Partner/Osborn Engineering. By June 2015, the Rosales/Schlaich Bergermann/Osborn Engineering design had been chosen as the preferred alternative. The cost of construction was estimated at $6 million ($8,100,000 in 2025 dollars).

The Whiskey Island bike and pedestrian bridge design effort slowed in late 2015 and early 2016. Cleveland Metroparks officials said in February 2016 that work on the bridge had been delayed after the agency decided to make "compromises in the design". By July 2016, The Plain Dealer newspaper was calling the design "diluted". The design changes came about due to the rising cost of implementing the winning design. To rein in costs, Metroparks decided to upgrade the existing Willow Avenue Bridge so that it could be used by cyclists and pedestrians. While retaining the Fink truss design proposed by the winning team, this shortened the bridge to just 365 feet (111 m). In August 2016, Cleveland Metroparks won a $7.95 million ($10,700,000 in 2025 dollars) Transportation Investment Generating Economic Recovery (TIGER) grant from the federal government to pay for the bridge's construction costs.

Cleveland Metroparks said it would seek bids to build the Whiskey Island pedestrian bridge before the end of 2017. The agency also said it hoped to begin construction in the summer of 2018, and complete work at the end of 2019.

== Description of the trail ==
The trail is owned by the city of Cleveland and maintained by Cleveland Metroparks.

The 0.5-mile (0.80 km), $2.5 million ($3,300,000 in 2025 dollars) northern leg of the Cleveland Foundation Centennial Lake Link Trail starts in the north near the intersection of River Road and Mulberry Avenue. It runs southeast between Center Street and Mulberry Avenue. Curving to a more south-southeast direction at Main Avenue, it passes beneath the Cleveland Memorial Shoreway, Main Avenue, Winslow Avenue, and Washington Avenue before piercing an arch of the Old Superior Viaduct. For much of this portion of the route, the trail is enclosed in a trench lined with stone retaining walls.

The 0.25-mile (0.40 km) southern leg of the Cleveland Foundation Centennial Lake Link Trail starts at Columbus Road. The trail, which is at ground level, curves across the Scranton Flats before passing beneath the Hope Memorial Bridge. Two new bridges allow it to pass over the tracks of the Flats Industrial Railroad and Scranton Road, before it joins the Ohio and Erie Canal Towpath Trail near the intersection of University and Scranton Roads.

== Bibliography ==
- Barr and Prevost (May 1, 2015). Final Report: Franklin Hill/Irishtown Bend Stabilization and Restoration (Report). Cleveland.
- Brown, R.C.; Norris, J.E. (1885). History of Portage County, Ohio. Chicago: Warner, Beers & Co.
- "Mahoning Division Carries Steel Industry's Life-Blood" (PDF). Erie Magazine. December 1958. pp. 12–17.
- Mott, Edward Harold (1901). Between the Ocean and the Lakes: The Story of Erie. New York: J.S. Collins. ISBN 9785880215393.
- Ohio Commissioner of Railroads and Telegraphs (1868). Annual Report of the Commissioner of Railroads and Telegraphs, to the Governor of the State of Ohio, for the Year 1867. Columbus, Ohio: L.D. Myers & Bro., State Printers.
- Ohio Secretary of State (1881). Annual Report of the Secretary of State to the Governor and General Assembly of the State of Ohio for the Year 1880 (Report). Columbus, Ohio: J.G. Brand & Co., State Printers.
- U.S. Army Corps of Engineers (August 2009). Cuyahoga River Bulkhead Technical Assistance, Cleveland, OH. Conceptual Designs and Cost Estimates for Bulkhead Repair and Slope Stability Improvements in the Vicinity of Riverbed Street (Report). Buffalo, N.Y.
- Watson, Sara Ruth; Wolfs, John R. (1981). Bridges of Metropolitan Cleveland: Past and Present. Cleveland: American Society of Civil Engineers, Cleveland Section.

41.494598°N 81.706799°W
