= Irishtown Bend =

Archaeological site in Ohio, United States

- Irishtown Bend Archeological District
- U.S. National Register of Historic Places
- U.S. Historic district
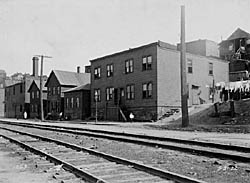
- Historic view of Irishtown Bend, c. 1922

- Location within Cleveland Location within Ohio Location within the United States
- Nearest city: Cleveland, Ohio
- Coordinates: 41°29′22.2″N 81°42′17.65″W
- Area: 6.9 acres (2.8 ha)
- NRHP reference No.: 90000757
- Added to NRHP: May 25, 1990

Irishtown Bend is the name given to both a former Irish American neighborhood and a landform located on the Flats of the west bank of the Cuyahoga River in the city of Cleveland in the U.S. state of Ohio in the United States. The landform consists of a tight meander in the Cuyahoga River, and the steep hillside above this meander.

The neighborhood of Irish immigrants and Irish Americans emerged about 1830. Portions of the area became industrial in the late 1800s. By 1900, most Irish residents had left the area, and it became an Eastern European immigrant enclave. The neighborhood went into significant decline for several reasons, and what little remained of it was razed at the end of the 1950s.

No commercial or residential buildings existed at the site by the 1980s, when archeological digs began. In 1990, a portion of the site, known as the Irishtown Bend Archeological District, was added to the National Register of Historic Places. Beginning in 2006, efforts began to stabilize the soil of Irishtown Bend, preserve the archeological history of the site, and convert the area into a park, with construction beginning in 2023.

== Geology ==
During the Mesozoic Era and until the end of the Tertiary period of the Cenozoic Era, the preglacial Teays River and Dover River carved most of the ancient Cuyahoga River valley into the Devonian and Permian bedrock of Ohio. At least four major glacial periods covered Ohio in ice during the last two million years. The glaciers that swept over the land left behind unsorted till and sorted outwash. Between 25,000 and 14,000 years ago, the Wisconsin glaciation blocked the Dover River's northward flow. Water backed up, until it began to flow southward along the course of the ancestral Tuscarawas River. As the ice sheet retreated, it left behind a recessional moraine near Akron, Ohio. The ice sheet retreated further, then made a minor advance. This advance left behind another recessional moraine near Defiance, Ohio. These moraines acted like dams, trapping water between them. The ephemeral lakes that formed laid down extensive deposits of clay and silt. Streams flowing down the sides of the moraines left behind alluvial fans and deltas. This left the ancient Dover River valley buried beneath as much as 500 feet (150 m) of various types of soil. About 10,000 years ago, several streams joined together north of the Defiance moraine and eroded their way through the buried Dover River valley to Lake Erie. Headward erosion eventually breached both the Defiance and Akron moraines and tapped into the southward flowing Tuscarawas River. As water levels receded, the northward-flowing Cuyahoga separated from the Tuscarawas (which still flows southward to this day).

Irishtown Bend reflects the complex geology created over the last 252 million years. The Devonian shale bedrock of the area is overlain by 40 to 60 feet (12 to 18 m) of compact glacial till, followed by 20 to 30 feet (6.1 to 9.1 m) of stiff clay, 30 feet (9.1 m) of weak clay, 20 feet (6.1 m) of silt, 10 feet (3.0 m) of sand, and 10 to 20 feet (3.0 to 6.1 m) of fill dirt. These layers cause the hillside to be unstable. About 15 feet (4.6 m) above the mean water line, the shear strength is 1,000 pounds per square foot (48 kPa), while at the top of the hill the shear strength is 2,000 pounds per square foot (96 kPa). Geological data indicate that the hill is sliding into the river at a rate of about 2 inches (51 mm) per year.

Extensive fill dirt was placed on the slope from the late 1950s to the early 1960s. This increased pressure on the soil below, turning what had been a dormant or slow slide into an accelerated one. Regrading of the hillside occurred afterward, after which significant slope instability began.

Fault scarps (ranging in size from a few inches to several feet) exist at the top of the slope (where the slope meets the West Side Plateau) and along Franklin Avenue. Since about 2004, subsidence and the emergence of medium fault scarps have occurred along Riverbed Street to the water, indicating the failure of the toe of the slope (likely due to failure of 1950s-era bulkheads) and increased water in the soil. There is evidence that a failure plane exists about 100 feet (30 m) behind the surface of the hillside.

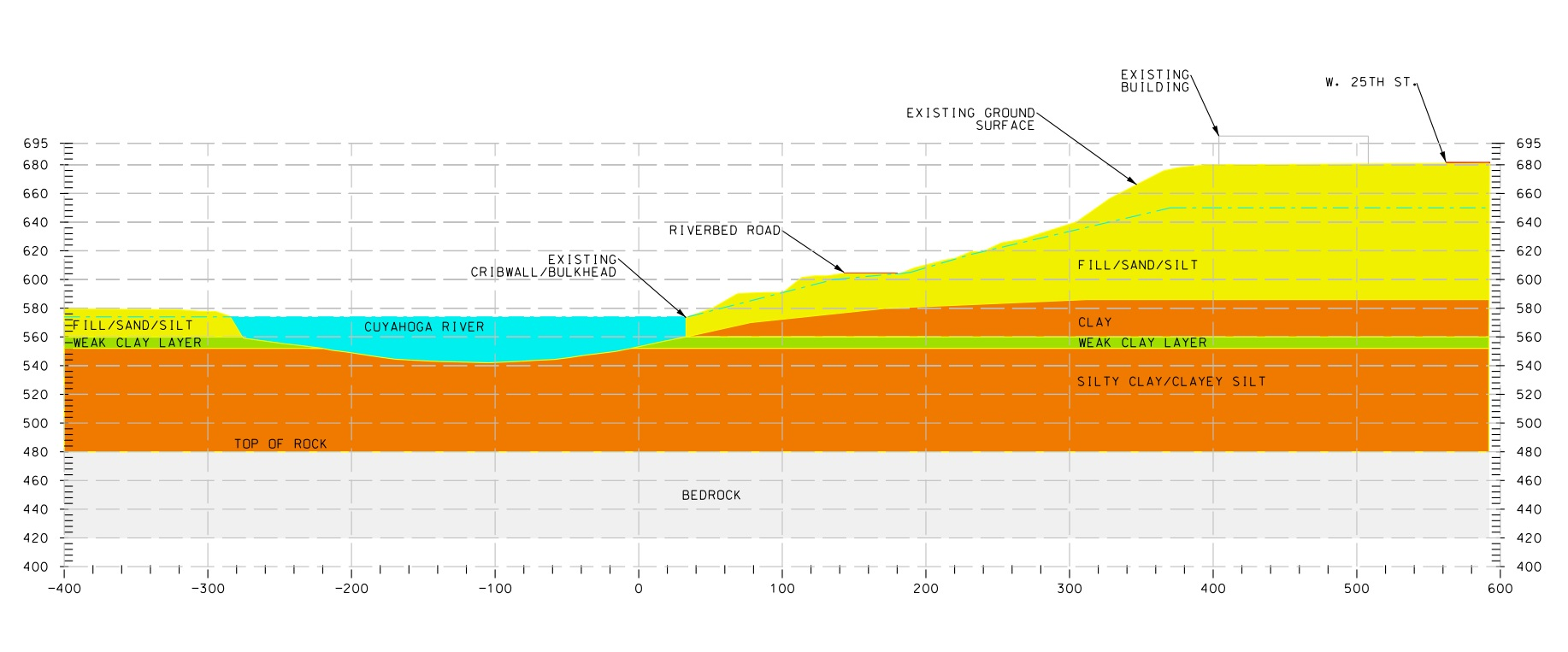
A cross-section diagram of the Cuyahoga River and Irishtown Bend. The dashed green line shows where a stable slope would exist.

== Emergence and disappearance of the neighborhood ==
The Irishtown Bend landform is located on the west bank of the Cuyahoga River in Cleveland, Ohio. It runs from Columbus Road downstream to the Detroit-Superior Bridge, a distance of about 2,500 feet (760 m). It extends from the shore of the Cuyahoga River up the hill to Franklin Avenue and W. 25th Street. The summit of the west side plateau is roughly 100 feet (30 m) above the river.

=== Formation of the neighborhood ===
Three views of Irishtown Bend

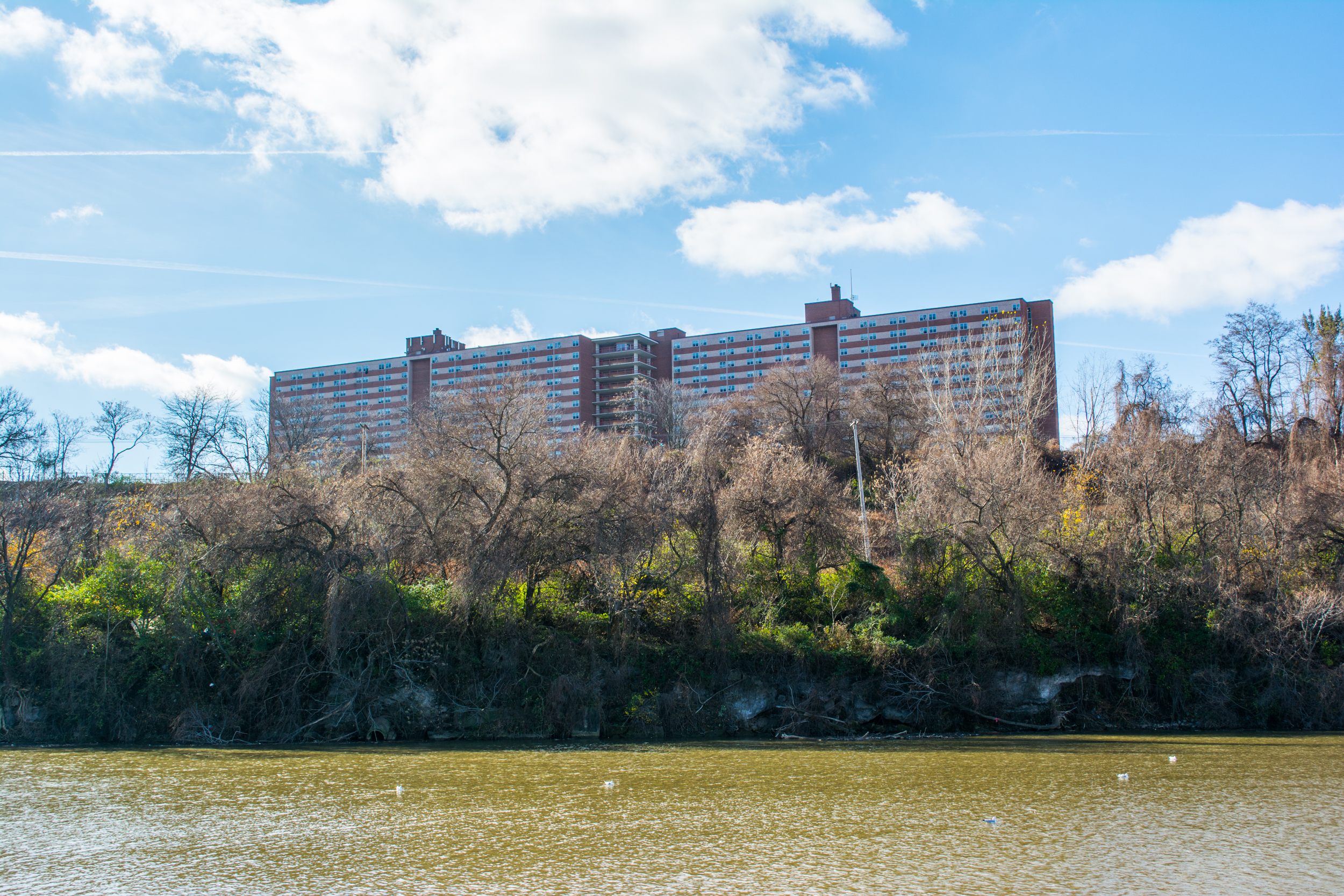
Irishtown Bend below the Riverview Towers highrise

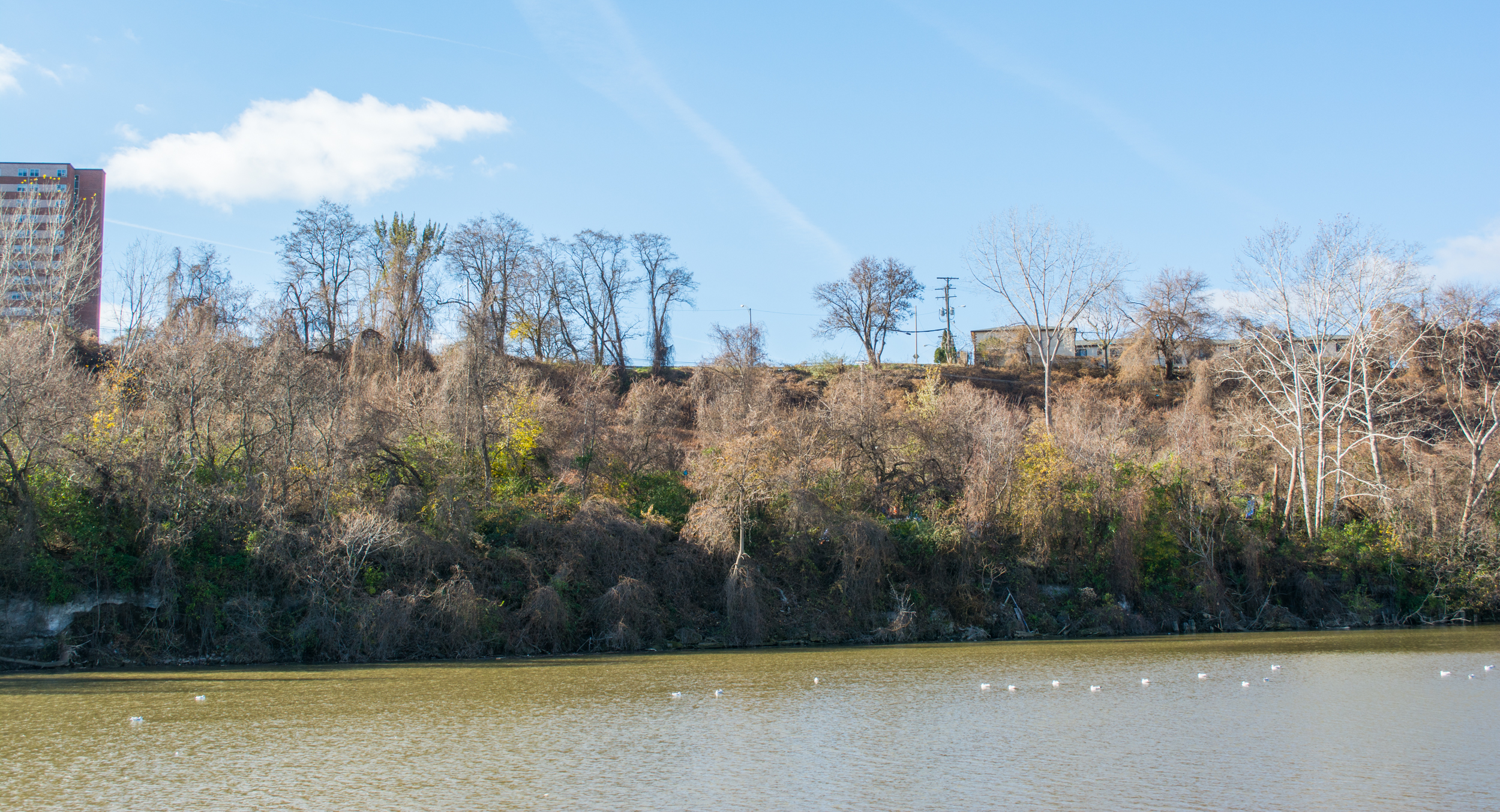
Irishtown Bend north of the Riverview Towers highrise

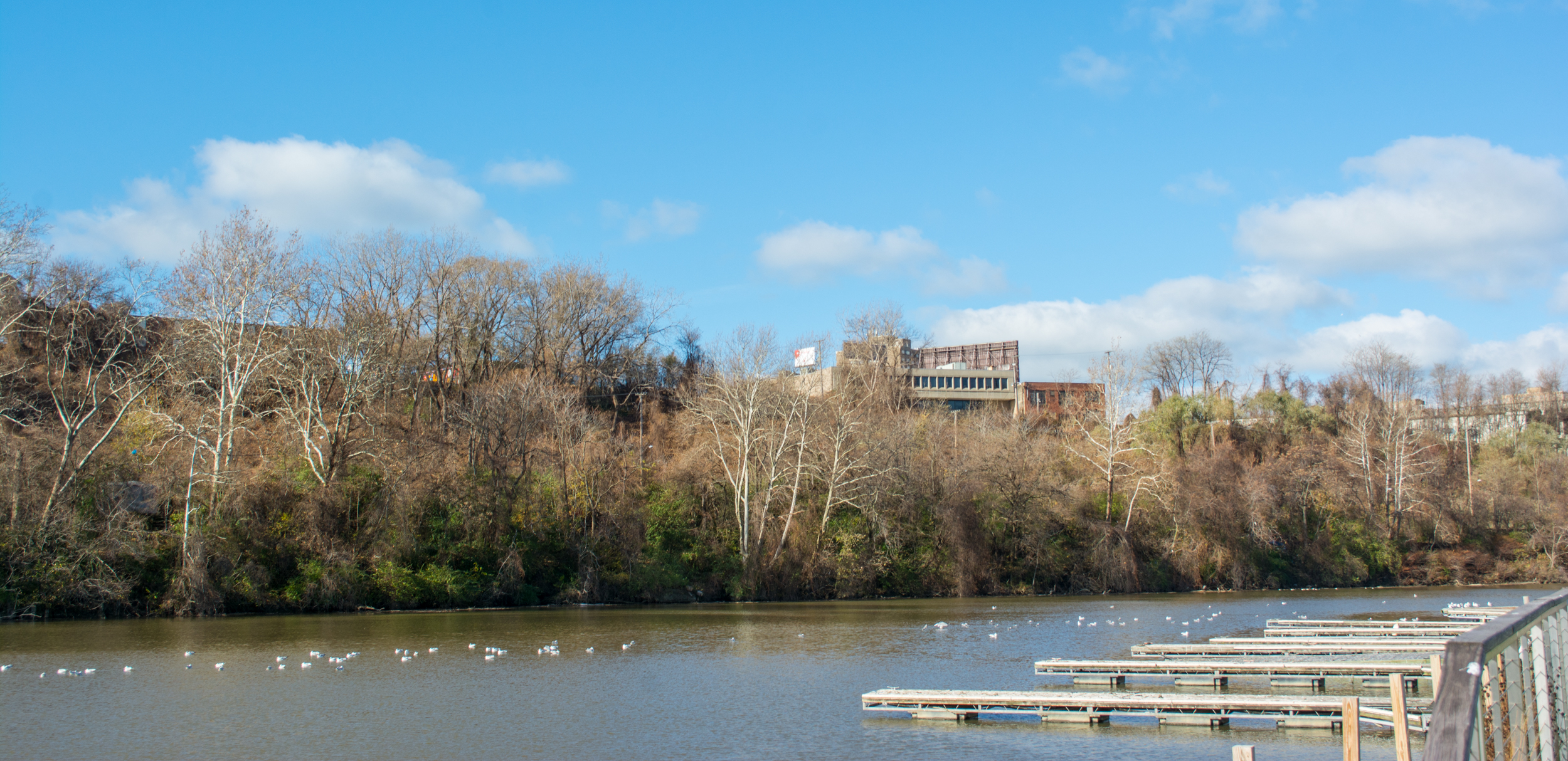
Irishtown Bend at the site of the demolished Lederer Terminal Warehouse

The Irishtown Bend neighborhood was part of a larger Irish enclave in Cleveland known as "the Angle". The other section of the Angle was bounded by W. 28th Street, Division Avenue, and the river. (Note: The Angle's boundaries are vague and were never agreed upon.) People of Irish descent first settled in Cleveland in large numbers about 1825. Most of the men had been workers on the Erie Canal, and as work on the canal ended they settled in Cleveland and moved their families to the small but growing town. Anti-Irish discrimination was strong, and the Irish were forced to settle on high ground along the shores of Lake Erie near the mouth of the Cuyahoga. This area, which later became known as Whiskey Island, was a peninsula which in 1827 was cut off by the creation of a new mouth of the Cuyahoga River. In the 1830s, the rapidly-expanding Cleveland economy had drawn more Irish to the area, doubling the size of the enclave and establishing "the Angle" as an adjunct to the Irish community on Whiskey Island.

Irishtown Bend emerged as a residential community for Irish immigrants in the 1850s after the Great Famine of Ireland caused a massive wave of Irish immigration to the United States. By 1870, 10 percent of Cleveland's 100,000 residents were Irish. Nearly all the residents of Irishtown Bend after 1850 were predominantly unskilled laborers. Eighty residential parcels were laid out by the city. (Note: Oral and written histories are unclear whether the area west and south of Franklin Avenue was included in the Irish neighborhood.)

=== The shanty town myth ===
Irishtown Bend is frequently referred to in the press and popular histories as a "shanty town". Nelson J. Callahan and William F. Hickey, historians of Cleveland's Irish community, state that nearly all the homes in Irishtown Bend were "shanties" (shacks), their riverside ends built on stilts over the steep ground.

Archeological evidence from a Cleveland Museum of Natural History investigation in the 1980s indicates a starkly different picture of solidly built wood frame homes, built on level ground and many with concrete or stone foundations. The neighborhood was working class, not poor, and most homes were "1 or 2 story, single family, frame structures." One excavated structure (probably from the 1850s or 1860s) featured a look-out basement with walls of dressed sandstone and a brick floor. A poor widow's home (built prior to 1872) had a brick foundation and wood frame construction, and was two stories high. It also had two wood frame outbuildings, each with a foundation. A semi-skilled dockworker's home (built prior to 1852) exhibited a deep foundation and a false facade of commercially manufactured brick. A middle-class professional worker's house had a sandstone foundation and wood frame construction, and was two and a half stories high. The limited photographic evidence available also indicates a community of well-constructed homes on level ground. Descriptions of the area as a "shantytown" appear to be rooted in anti-Irish sentiment, rather than fact.

=== Shift to an Eastern European enclave ===
Between 1860 and 1880, the nature of Irishtown Bend had changed. Instead of Irish immigrants, most residents of the area were first-generation Irish Americans. Beginning in 1880, Irish residents were displaced by immigrants from Eastern Europe, primarily Hungarians. Although Irish Americans continued to own most of the land at Irishtown Bend, fully half the residents of the area were of Eastern European descent by 1900. By this time, Irish Americans still living in Irishtown Bend were skilled or semi-skilled workers, and the new immigrant residents of the neighborhood appear to have chosen the Bend as their new home because they, too, were skilled or semi-skilled. At its height, Irishtown Bend had 119 buildings, including 78 residences housing 138 families.

=== Abandonment and demolition ===
Beginning about 1898, Irishtown Bend began to be abandoned as residents moved into better homes elsewhere and strict national immigration limits meant there were few immigrants to replace them. A third of all residences had been demolished by 1912. Many more were vacant, and a number of temporary shacks were erected. The 80,000-square-foot (7,400 m^{2}) Lederer Terminal Warehouse opened at 1530 Riverbed about 1920.

A Hooverville grew up on the largely vacant Irishtown Bend in the 1930s. Most oral histories and written descriptions depicting housing here as a "shanty town" date to this period.

Only five homes still stood in the area in 1952, and all of these had long been vacant. A garage made of concrete block was built at Irishtown Bend between 1952 and 1954, but this appears to be the only new construction in several decades. What was left of Irishtown Bend was razed in the mid to late 1950s.

== Other infrastructure at Irishtown Bend ==
=== Railroad and associated infrastructure ===
The Cleveland and Mahoning Railroad (C&M; later the Cleveland and Mahoning Valley Railroad) was founded in 1848 and authorized to build a line from Cleveland to Warren, Ohio, and then into Pennsylvania. The railroad intended to connect with the Cleveland, Columbus and Cincinnati Railroad in Cleveland, but a crossing of the Cuyahoga was never effected. The Atlantic and Great Western Railroad leased the C&M in July 1863, and agreed to complete the line within the Cleveland city limits. Work on a new passenger depot at the Scranton Flats began in August 1863, and the tracks to the new depot were completed on November 4.

In March 1880, the Atlantic & Great Western emerged from bankruptcy as a new company, the New York, Pennsylvania and Ohio Railroad (NYP&O). In the spring of 1886, the NYP&O extended the old C&M route in Cleveland by crossing the base of the Scranton Peninsula, curving around Irishtown Bend, and crossing "the Angle" to reach and then bridge the Old Ship Channel. Trains began running July 4. Docks were built on either side of Columbus Road on Irishtown Bend. The rail yards extended for nearly 2 miles (3.2 km) along the southwest bank of the Old Ship Channel, around Irishtown Bend, in Tremont, and east of Broadway Avenue in Cleveland's North Broadway and South Broadway neighborhoods. Docks were built just north of where the tracks curved westward to pass under Detroit Avenue.

The railroad built a new, steam-operated dock in 1912 near what is now the Detroit-Superior Bridge. It was designed by a local firm, Wellman Engineering. Traffic along the Cuyahoga River in this area was so extensive, the C&MV had a rail yard eight tracks wide along Irishtown Bend to accommodate it.

=== Bulkheading the Bend ===
The navigable Cuyahoga River in and near Cleveland has a number of exceptionally tight meanders. As Great Lakes freighters became increasingly larger near the end of the 1800s, these meanders became a hindrance to river traffic. The city of Cleveland the U.S. Army Corps of Engineers worked together over the next six decades to implement a plan to widen the river in a number of places, especially where the meanders were tight. Irishtown Bend was one of the key trouble spots. The first extensive cuts on the west bank of the river occurred in August 1940. Steel sheet bulkheads were driven vertically into the riverbed at the shoreline to help hold back the land above. The widening was only partially completed when World War II broke out and delayed completion of the project.

A 15-year postwar battle to win funding for completion of the river widening project finally concluded in the 1950s, and the west bank once more widened and bulkheaded in 1958. (Note: A concrete cribwall was erected over much of the shoreline as well, although the dates of its installation are not known.)

=== Sewers, bridges, and public housing ===
Although records are scanty, a brick sewer was built along what is now Riverbed Street some time about 1900. In 1947, Cleveland sewer district engineers built a 60-inch (150 cm) brick and concrete sewer tunnel known as the Westerly Low-Level Interceptor about 30 feet (9.1 m) below Riverbed Street. The tunnel was poorly designed, and constructed in an area known to be prone to subsidence.

In 1914, construction began on the Detroit-Superior Bridge at the north end of Irishtown Bend. The railroad tracks ran beneath one of the arches of the bridge. The railroad dock was moved 200 feet (61 m) upstream in 1917 to accommodate construction of the western abutments of the bridge.

In December 1959, the Cleveland Metropolitan Housing Authority (CMHA) purchased 22 acres (89,000 m^{2}) of land along the Irishtown Bend with the intent of building public housing on the site. The area encompassed by the purchase was bounded by Bridge Avenue, W. 25th Street, Detroit Avenue, and the railroad tracks. CMHA's 15-story Riverview Towers opened in January 1964. Another 15 three-story "garden apartments" were built around Riverview Towers between W. 25th Street, Bridge Avenue, and Franklin Avenue. (Note: The garden apartments were razed in 2000.) Extensive fill dirt was placed on the slope from the late 1950s to the early 1960s, (Note: A report by the engineering firm of Barr and Prevost in 2015 claimed most of this fill dirt was placed above Franklin Avenue.) and the hillside regraded. The fill dirt reactivated and accelerated existing slides, and initiated several new ones.

Additional infrastructure changes on the hillside included relocated the intersection of Franklin Avenue and W. 25th Street farther north in 1965, and widening one-lane Riverbed Street to two lanes in 1985. The new eastern lane covered the main line of the now-removed railroad track.

=== Damage due to soil slippage ===
Problems with water saturating the northern end of Irishtown Bend and worsening the hill's stability problems were first identified in 1960, when the Erie-Lackawanna Railroad tracks north of the Lederer Terminal Warehouse subsided significantly and had to be repaired. An investigation by the CMHA concluded that saturated soil was the culprit, and blamed either an unspecified nearby broken water line or an unknown natural spring. A landslide occurred in 1966, which was later attributed to water saturation caused by either a broken water main or sewer line. The following year, drains and a gutter were constructed from W. 25th Street down to the river's edge to help guide runoff away from the slope. (Note: These were placed about halfway between Church Avenue and Detroit Avenue.) By 1989, extensive water seepage had begun to flow out of the hill and over Riverbed Street.

About 2004 or 2005, the Irishtown Bend hill began to subside at a significantly higher rate. In November 2005, major cracks appeared in Riverbed Street. The city repaved the street in January 2006, major cracks reappeared only two weeks later. The city ordered the street closed as a safety measure. Throughout 2007, the subsidence worsened, with the eastern half of Riverbed Street dropping by more than 4 feet (1.2 m).

After seven years and several studies, local authorities settled in February 2015 on a $49 million ($66,600,000 in 2025 dollars) plan to stabilize the hillside. Road and sewer repair, the construction of a "lake link" trail through the area, and the establishment of a large new public park at Irishtown Bend were put on hold while funding was sought for the stabilization effort. Funds raised for the $28 million ($36,800,000 in 2025 dollars) bulkhead restoration project totaled $10.5 million ($13,800,000 in 2025 dollars) by November 2017, with several funding sources still being sought.

== Lake Link Trail and potential park ==
In 1987, Dr. Alfred M. Lee, an archaeologist at the Cleveland Museum of Natural History, began a three-year-long series of archaeological digs at Irishtown Bend.

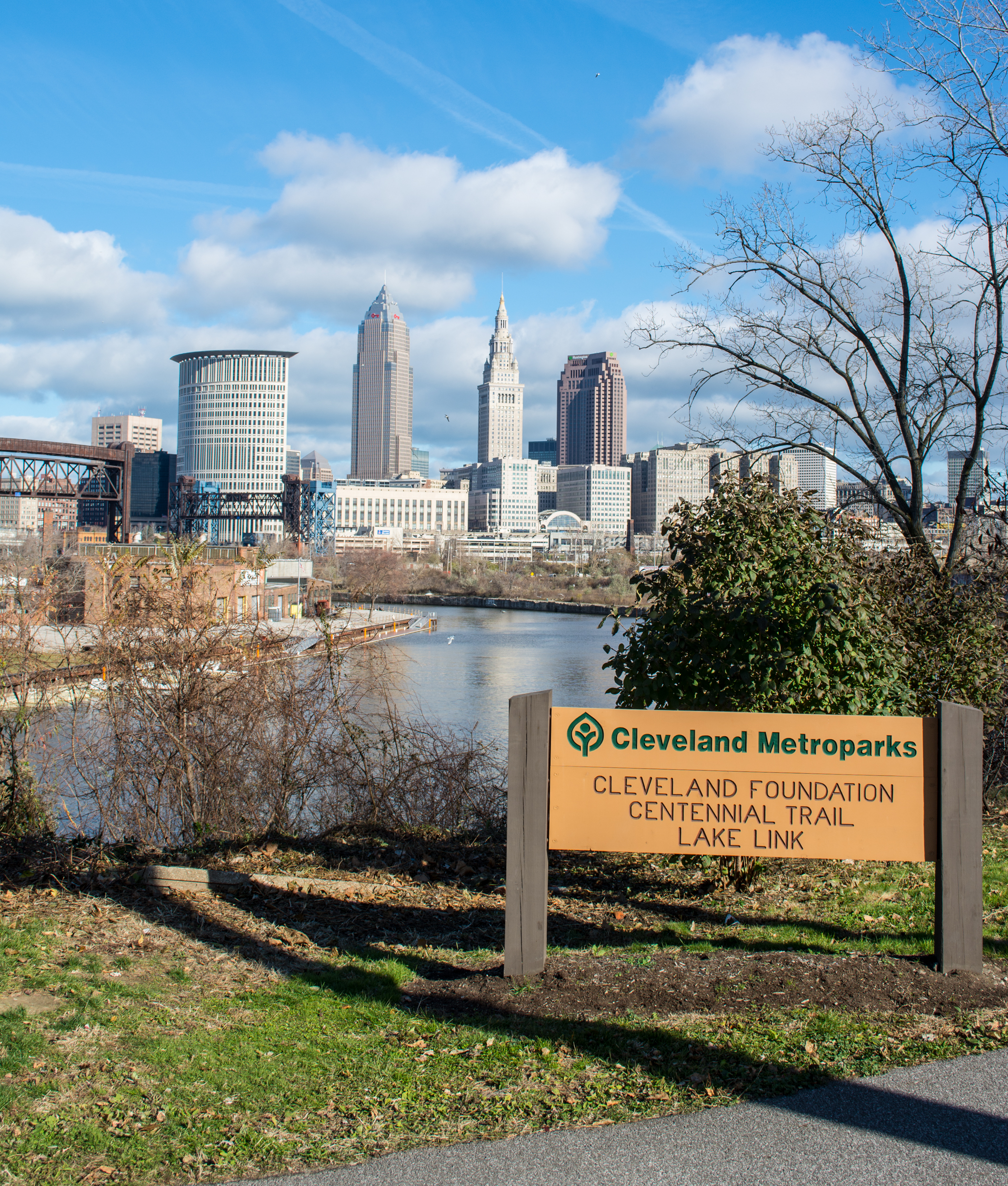
Northern terminus of the southern leg of the Cleveland Foundation Centennial Lake Link Trail.

The archaeological dig generated interest in preserving the site and making it accessible to the public. After two years of work by six governmental planning agencies, the Cuyahoga County Planning Commission released a report in April 1992 that recommended an 18-mile (29 km) series of parks, protected areas, trails, and other new infrastructure to connect Lake Erie with the Cuyahoga Valley National Park to the south of Cleveland. The report advocated a series of biking and hiking trails at Irishtown Bend and "the Angle" to link the area with Whiskey Island to the north and the Ohio and Erie Canal Towpath Trail and other parks and trails in the south.

With the instability of the Irishtown Bend making it increasingly clear that the area should not be used for important infrastructure, the city of Cleveland, Cuyahoga County, several nonprofits, and landowners at Irishtown Bend began parallel discussions in 2006 about the future of the area and the abandoned railroad tracks. In January 2009, these groups issued a report, the "Flats Connections Plan", which advocated turning the abandoned trackbed between Kingsbury Run and Whiskey Island into a biking-hiking trail. The plan also included the construction of a new pedestrian bridge over the Old Ship Channel of the Cuyahoga River to reconnect the tracks with the old rail yard on Whiskey Island. Another of the plan proposed converting the Irishtown Bend hillside into a park, playgrounds, and wetlands.

=== The Cleveland Foundation Centennial Lake Link Trail ===
Initial design work for trail began in 2009. The Cuyahoga County Planning Commission took over planning for the pedestrian bridge linking the trail to Whiskey Island, and was considering four design finalists by October 2014. A design by Miguel Rosales/Schlaich Bergermann Partner/Osborn Engineering was chosen as the preferred alternative in June 2015.

The George Gund Foundation gave $2 million ($2,900,000 in 2025 dollars) to the project in November 2011, and The Cleveland Foundation made a $5 million ($6,800,000 in 2025 dollars) gift in August 2014. In honor of The Cleveland Foundation gift, Cleveland Metroparks (designer, builder, and eventual maintainer of the trail) said the path would be renamed the Cleveland Foundation Centennial Lake Link Trail.

The Cleveland Foundation Centennial Lake Link Trail was constructed in three phases. Work began on the south leg of the Cleveland Foundation Centennial Lake Link Trail (from the head of the Ohio and Erie Canal Towpath Trail to Columbus Road) in the fall of 2014, and it opened on August 13, 2015. Work began on the northern section of the trail (from the Detroit-Superior Bridge to the Old Ship Channel) in August 2016, and it opened on June 9, 2017. Work on the middle section of the trail was delayed pending stabilization of the Irishtown Bend hillside.

Cleveland Metroparks said it would seek bids to build the Whiskey Island pedestrian bridge before the end of 2017, and hoped to complete work at the end of 2019.

=== Potential park ===
The Cleveland-Cuyahoga County Port Authority took the lead in identifying a solution for stabilizing the soil at Irishtown Bend in October 2012.

In 2009, the Corps of Engineers estimated that stabilizing the hillside would cost $219 million ($328,700,000 in 2025 dollars). A 17-month study of the site by the Port Authority led to a new estimate of just $49 million ($66,600,000 in 2025 dollars) in February 2015. Ohio City Inc. (a nonprofit community development corporation) led the city of Cleveland, the Cleveland-Cuyahoga County Port Authority, and the nonprofit park advocacy group LAND Studio in a planning effort to begin the work of designing the park and the trail that would run through it. The now-17-acre (69,000 m2) park included the summit of hillside, an area occupied by Ohio City Farms, four buildings, and a parking lot.

Public meetings about the park design began to be held in June 2017.

A revised park design was unveiled in late August 2017. A primary entry plaza was planned for the intersection of Franklin Avenue and W. 25th Street, with a secondary entry plaza and cultural center near the Detroit-Superior Bridge. The proposed park had four zones. At the summit on the south was Ohio City Farms, which would be integrated into the park. North of the farms was a neighborhood park and playground. The hillside above Franklin Avenue and between Franklin Avenue and Riverbed Street would be a history zone, with boardwalks over excavated archeological sites. From Riverbed Street to the shoreline would be a riverfront zone, with pedestrian promenade and man-made wetland. Paths would zigzag across the park, connecting the zones. A 22-foot (6.7 m) high canopy walkway in the neighborhood park and history zones would allow pedestrians to access residential areas on north of the park via an arch in the Detroit-Superior Bridge (rather than descending all the way to the riverbank or up onto W. 25th Street). The proposed park design was submitted to the Cleveland Planning Commission on September 1, 2017.

The state of Ohio approved $2.5 million ($3,200,000 in 2025 dollars) to support stabilization of Irishtown Bend in March 2018, half what had been sought by backers of the park.

Cuyahoga County leased two acres (parcels 003-21-001 and 003-20-004) adjacent to the Superior Viaduct to the park planning organizations in April 2018. The terms of the lease are $1 per year, with an initial term of 25 years. It is renewable for an additional 50 years, up to a total of 99 years. The planning organizations have an option to buy, but the county will retain an easement to allow inspection of the former bridge.

== Irishtown Bend Archeological District ==
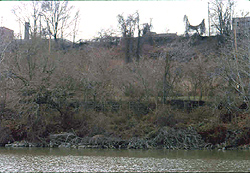
Irishtown Bend Archeological District

The Irishtown Bend Archeological District is a historic site located on the Irishtown Bend.

Between 1987 and 1989, the Department of Archaeology at the Cleveland Museum of Natural History began excavations at the site of three former homes in the Irishtown Bend residential district. The histories of the three families were documented using archival and genealogical sources, and the artifacts from the sites revealed the economic status of each family.

The archaeological dig generated interest in preserving the site and making it accessible to the public.

The Irishtown Bend Archeological District was added to the National Register of Historic Places on May 25, 1990. It is bounded by Riverbed Street, Russia Street, Franklin Avenue, and Columbus Road. These streets (some of which no longer exist) defined the residential area during the 19th century. Construction of the Lederer Warehouse Terminal and CMHA public housing essentially destroyed any archeological evidence which may have existed north of Russia Street or west or south of Franklin Avenue. Remnants of coal docks on the Cuyahoga River shoreline on either side of Columbus Road and slightly downstream of Columbus Road, the coal tipple near the Detroit-Superior Bridge, and the foundations of the Lederer Terminal Warehouse still exist.

Much of the archeologically important evidence lies beneath 2 to 7.5 feet (0.61 to 2.29 m) of soil. This soil comes from grading of land after the demolition of adjacent properties, soil pushed over the cliff onto the hillside during construction of the CMHA housing, illegal refuse and soil dumping, erosion, and possibly disturbances during squatter occupation of the site during the Great Depression. Despite being covered by fill dirt and regraded extensively, most archeologically important evidence still remains undisturbed in the historic district.

The Irishtown Bend Archeological District is not open to the public, but can be seen from Riverbed Road.

== Bibliography ==
- Barr and Prevost (May 1, 2015). Final Report: Franklin Hill/Irishtown Bend Stabilization and Restoration (Report). Cleveland. Archived from the original on December 1, 2017.
- Brown, R.C.; Norris, J.E. (1885). History of Portage County, Ohio. Chicago: Warner, Beers & Co.
- Callahan, Nelson J.; Hickey, William F. (1978). Irish Americans and Their Communities of Cleveland. Cleveland: Cleveland State University.
- Fleitz, David L. (2009). The Irish in Baseball: An Early History. Jefferson, N.C.: McFarland. ISBN 9780786434190.
- Grabski, Matthew Lee (2005). Cleveland's Flats. Charleston, S.C.: Arcadia Publishing. ISBN 9780738540108.
- Harris, Ann G.; Tuttle, Esther; Tuttle, Sherwood D. (2004). Geology of National Parks. Dubuque, Iowa: Kendall/Hunt Publishing Co. ISBN 9780787299712.
- Irishtown Bend Archaeological District. National Register of Historic Places Registration Form. NPS Form 10-900 (Rev. 8-86) (PDF) (Report). Washington, D.C.: National Park Service, United States Department of the Interior. July 10, 1989.
- Kenny, Kevin (2016). The American Irish: A History. New York: Routledge. ISBN 9781138143890.
- "Mahoning Division Carries Steel Industry's Life-Blood" (PDF). Erie Magazine. December 1958. pp. 12–17.
- Mott, Edward Harold (1901). Between the Ocean and the Lakes: The Story of Erie. New York: J.S. Collins.
- Myers, John; Cetina, Judith G. (2015). Irish Cleveland. Charleston, S.C.: Arcadia Publishing. ISBN 9781467113496.
- Ohio Commissioner of Railroads and Telegraphs (1868). Annual Report of the Commissioner of Railroads and Telegraphs, to the Governor of the State of Ohio, for the Year 1867. Columbus, Ohio: L.D. Myers & Bro., State Printers.
- Ohio Secretary of State (1881). Annual Report of the Secretary of State to the Governor and General Assembly of the State of Ohio for the Year 1880 (Report). Columbus, Ohio: J.G. Brand & Co., State Printers.
- U.S. Army Corps of Engineers (August 2009). Cuyahoga River Bulkhead Technical Assistance, Cleveland, OH. Conceptual Designs and Cost Estimates for Bulkhead Repair and Slope Stability Improvements in the Vicinity of Riverbed Street (Report). Buffalo, N.Y. Archived from the original on November 29, 2017.
- Watson, Sara Ruth; Wolfs, John R. (1981). Bridges of Metropolitan Cleveland: Past and Present. Cleveland: American Society of Civil Engineers, Cleveland Section.
