= Cleveland Foundation =

Community foundation in Ohio, US

- Founded: 1914; 112 years ago
- Founder: Frederick Harris Goff
- Type: community foundation
- Purpose: enhance the lives of all residents of Greater Cleveland, address needs through grantmaking, provide leadership on key community issues.
- Headquarters: 6601 Euclid Ave., Cleveland, Ohio 44103
- President & CEO: Lillian Kuri
- Endowment: $2.8 billion (year ended 2022)
- Employees: 91
- Website: www.clevelandfoundation.org

The Cleveland Foundation, based in Cleveland, Ohio, is the world's first community foundation and one of the largest today, with assets of $2.8 billion and annual grants of more than $100 million.

The Cleveland Foundation partners with donors to improve the lives of residents in Cuyahoga, Lake and Geauga counties, now and for generations to come. The Cleveland Foundation is made up of more than 800 funds representing individuals, families, organizations and corporations. The current president and chief executive officer is Lillian Kuri.

The foundation was established in 1914 by Frederick Harris Goff, a well-known lawyer and banker at the Cleveland Trust Company, who sought to eliminate the "dead hand" of organized philanthropy, where charitable dollars were trapped in outdated, irrevocable wills.

Frederick Harris Goff led from 1914 to 1919. Raymond C. Moley led the foundation from 1919 to 1923. Carlton K. Matson, 1924–1928. Leyton E. Carter led the Foundation for 25 years, from 1928 to 1953. From 1953 to 1967, J. Kimball Johnson. James A. Norton, 1968–1973, left the foundation upon Ohio governor John J. Gilligan’s invitation to serve as chancellor of the Ohio Board of Regents. Barbara Haas Rawson served as interim director, 1973–1974. Homer C. Wadsworth, 1974–1983. Steven A. Minter, who had served as the commissioner of public welfare for the State of Massachusetts and first under secretary of the US Department of Education, was CEO from 1984 to 2003. Ronald B. Richard, with experience in the U.S. Foreign Service, the CIA, and the private sector, led the foundation from 2003–2023.
