= Cincinnati, Lebanon and Northern Railway =

Ohio railroad (1885–1926)

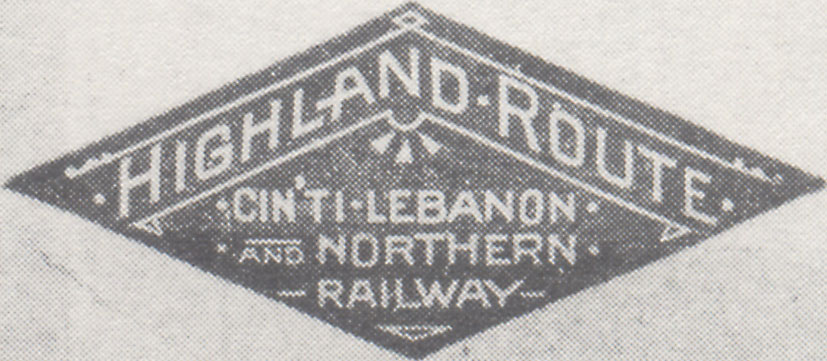
- CL&N (red)

Overview
- Headquarters: Cincinnati, Ohio, U.S.
- Locale: Miami Valley, Ohio
- Dates of operation: 1885–1926
- Successor: Pennsylvania Railroad

Technical
- Track gauge: 4 ft 8 1/2 in (1,435 mm) standard gauge
- Previous gauge: originally 3 ft (914 mm)

The Cincinnati, Lebanon and Northern Railway (CL&N) was a local passenger and freight-carrying railroad in the southwestern part of the U.S. state of Ohio, connecting Cincinnati to Dayton via Lebanon. It was built in the late 19th century to give the town of Lebanon and Warren County better transportation facilities. The railroad was locally known as the "Highland Route", since it followed the ridge between the Little and Great Miami rivers, and was the only line not affected by floods such as the Great Dayton Flood of 1913.

The line was completed in 1881, and the CL&N was formed in 1885. The company went through multiple bankruptcies until the Pennsylvania Railroad gained control in 1896. CL&N continued its own operations until 1921, and existed until 1926, when the parent company merged CL&N and other smaller companies. Except for several years in the mid-1880s, when the line was under control of the 3 ft (914 mm) narrow gauge Toledo, Cincinnati and St. Louis Railroad, it was not a major line, in part due to its steep approach to downtown Cincinnati. For this reason, portions of the line have been abandoned, beginning in 1952 with a segment north of Lebanon.

Passenger services from Cincinnati terminated at Lebanon until the early 1900s. Passenger service was eliminated circa 1910 and restored as of 1915, extended to Dayton until 1928. Passenger trains were eliminated entirely in 1934. Conrail, the Pennsylvania Railroad's successor, sold the remaining trackage in the 1980s to the Indiana and Ohio Railway, a short line now owned by Genesee & Wyoming. That company continues to provide local freight service on the ex-CL&N, and the Lebanon Mason Monroe Railroad operates tourist trains on a portion of the line near Lebanon.

== History ==
=== Planning and grading, 1850–1876 ===
The town of Lebanon, Ohio, laid out in 1802, was bypassed by the Miami and Erie Canal in 1830; the branch Warren County Canal to Lebanon was wrecked by flooding in 1848. The Little Miami Railroad (1846, later a Pennsylvania line) and Cincinnati, Hamilton and Dayton Railroad (1851, later a B&O line) followed the valleys of the Little and Great Miami rivers (the M&E Canal had used the latter), also bypassing the highlands on which Lebanon lay. Residents of the town obtained a legislative charter in March 1850 for the Cincinnati, Lebanon and Xenia Railroad (CL&X), which would extend from Cincinnati northeast through Lebanon to Xenia. At the latter town, the incorporators decided the most likely connection would be the New York and Erie Railroad, which was planning on extending into Ohio. Thus the line was planned to use the Erie's 6 ft (1,829 mm) broad gauge.

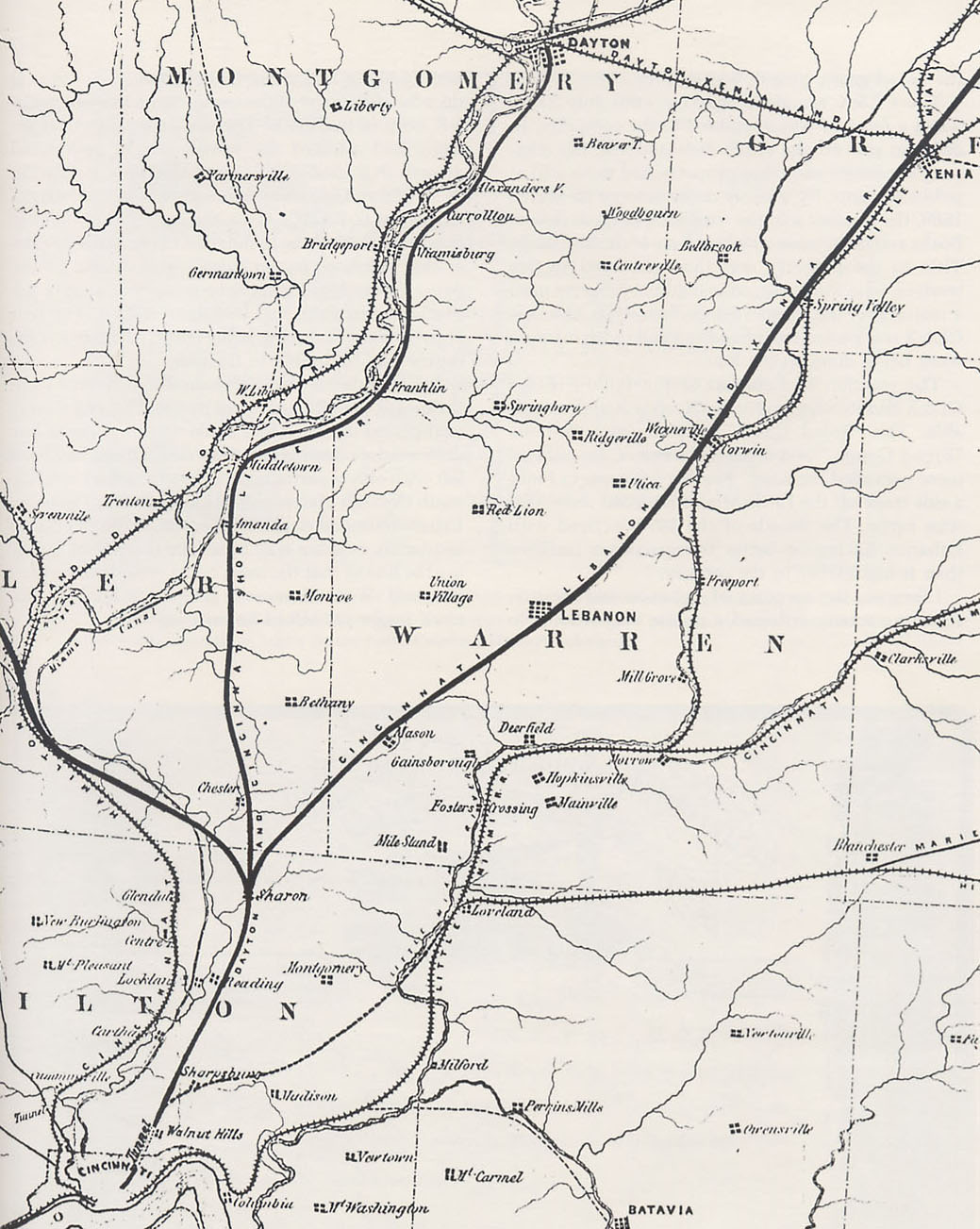
1854 map of the D&C and CL&X

To enter the city of Cincinnati, the CL&X would join the Dayton and Cincinnati Railroad (D&C), which was planning the 10,011-foot (3,051 m) double-track Deer Creek Tunnel through the Walnut Hills, at Sharonville (then known as Sharon). Tunnel construction began in late 1852, and the CL&X was finally organized under the charter in November. The CL&X located right-of-way, and began construction in about April 1853, but was forced to stop work by the end of 1855 due to lack of funds. Only grading between Sharon and Lebanon, mostly north of Mason, had been completed. (The tunnel project also failed, and was eventually acquired by the CL&N.) In July 1861, the courts appointed a receiver for the CL&X, who in March 1869 sold the unfinished railroad, which had cost $83,885, to 40 area residents for $4,000. Five trustees would ensure that the property was not sold without a majority of its owners consenting. Twenty years after its canal connection was destroyed, Lebanon was still without a modern connection to the outside world, and its economy continued to stagnate.

The 1870s fad of the narrow gauge railway, which was cheaper than broader gauges to build and operate (for low volumes of traffic), presented a new possibility. The Dayton and South Eastern Railroad (D&SE, later a B&O line) was planning a 3 ft narrow gauge line from the Jackson County mines through Xenia to Dayton, and a branch from Xenia through Lebanon would connect to the markets at Cincinnati. The editors of the local newspaper, The Western Star, encouraged citizens to support the project, but by taking a more active role and organizing a locally owned railroad company to ensure its completion. Editorials likened the situation to Aesop's fable of Hercules and the Carter, where Hercules tells a stuck carter that he will not assist unless the carter himself is willing to help. In November 1874, residents of Lebanon and the surrounding area organized the 3 ft narrow gauge Miami Valley Narrow Gauge Railway (renamed Miami Valley Railway in October 1876), which would complete the unfinished CL&X as a branch of the D&SE.

Slow stock subscriptions delayed surveying until June 1875, when a line was located between Xenia and the Marietta and Cincinnati Railroad (M&C, later a B&O line) west of Norwood. Property owners in the villages of Norwood and Pleasant Ridge, wishing to develop their land as suburbs, put forward a proposition to relocate the line to the east through their land in exchange for free right-of-way, and to build a steam dummy line between Norwood and the horse car lines in Walnut Hills, which would provide Miami Valley passengers with a more direct entrance to downtown Cincinnati than the circuitous M&C. However, in August, an even more direct route south of Norwood, through the rugged Deer Creek Valley, was suggested, by which the Miami Valley could obtain its own access to Cincinnati. After imposing heavy restrictions, which would require the construction of several trestles and a tunnel, the Cincinnati City Council granted the right-of-way through the valley, including Eden Park, to the railroad company. The owners of the old CL&X grade sold it in April 1876 for $8,000 in stock of the new company, and most of the land outside Cincinnati had been bought by that summer. The Miami Valley resolved in May 1876 to build only north to Waynesville, a village southwest of Xenia, where the projected Waynesville, Port William and Jeffersonville Railroad and Jeffersonville, Mt. Sterling and Columbus Railroad would extend to Columbus, crossing the D&SE at Octa. (The former completed most of its line, but abandoned it in 1887; the latter was able to grade only a portion.)

=== Construction and early operations, 1876–1885 ===
President Seth S. Haines of Waynesville broke ground in Eden Park on September 1, 1876, although most early work was done outside Cincinnati. The company continued to be plagued by lack of funds, and, despite completion of the grade between Norwood and Waynesville within a year, work soon slowed and eventually stopped in late 1878. Contractor John B. Benedict brought a suit in December for breach of contract, alleging that he was not properly paid. During the trial, two embarrassing facts came to light: Haines and Benedict had signed a "secret contract" giving Haines a portion of the bonds paid to Benedict, and the price of the line south of Norwood had been artificially inflated so that the connecting Cincinnati and Eastern Railway (C&E, later a N&W line) would have to pay more for trackage rights into Cincinnati. However, it was nonpayment of interest on bonds that forced the Miami Valley into receivership in January and foreclosure in March 1880. Another decade had passed and Lebanon still lacked a railroad.

The Toledo, Delphos and Burlington Railroad (TD&B), a growing 3 ft narrow gauge system with roots in the town of Delphos, would finally give Lebanon its rail line. Together with a group of suburban Cincinnati investors, the TD&B bought the unfinished grade at the foreclosure sale for $61,000 and incorporated the 3 ft narrow gauge Cincinnati Northern Railway as its successor on June 8, 1880. (The TD&B would also acquire the Dayton and South Eastern in February 1881.) At first the TD&B and Cincinnati-area residents shared stock and management equally, but soon this was changed so that the former party would control all the stock for ease in future consolidation, and the latter would locally manage the road. As the TD&B was in the process of building into Dayton from the north, it was decided that the new company would not use the grade all the way to Waynesville. Instead, the TD&B would construct a connection from the D&SE at a point they called Lebanon Junction, now inside Dayton near the intersection of Woodman and Rainier Drives, to the small village of Dodds. There the Cincinnati Northern would begin, following the Miami Valley's route through Lebanon to Cincinnati. Construction resumed in late 1880, and proceeded rapidly thanks to funding from Ohio and Northeastern capitalists. Mixed train operations between Lebanon and Norwood, where connections could be made with the M&C, began on May 30, 1881, and on September 5 the line was opened south to a streetcar connection at Oak Street, just north of the tunnel. Service was extended through the tunnel to the Eden Park entrance on January 12, 1882, and on February 13 a temporary Cincinnati depot opened just north of Court Street. With the completion of the TD&B's branch from Lebanon Junction to Dodds in December 1881, the Cincinnati-Dayton line was finally complete; Jackson County coal was first shipped over it in February 1882. Two short branches to the suburbs of Montgomery and Avondale—the latter built separately as the Spring Grove, Avondale and Cincinnati Railway (SGA&C)—opened on November 14, 1881 and July 1, 1882, respectively. C&E operations to Court Street began by April 1882, using the Cincinnati Northern south of a junction at Idlewild, and in October the Cincinnati Northern laid tracks across that street into its permanent depot at the southeast corner of the Broadway Street intersection.

The TD&B absorbed its subsidiary, the Toledo, Cincinnati and St. Louis Railroad (TC&StL), in March 1882, and took its name as more descriptive of the growing system, which hoped to become part of a nationwide narrow gauge network stretching southwest to Mexico City. One year later, in May 1883, the Cincinnati Northern and the SGA&C were consolidated into the TC&StL. However, the TC&StL was constructed cheaply, with poor drainage and little ballast. While the Cincinnati Northern had been built to better standards, the connecting line between Lebanon Junction and Dodds was just as bad. The inadequate facilities and equipment, as well as difficulties in interchanging equipment with 4 ft 8 1/2 in (1,435 mm) standard gauge lines, contributed to its entering receivership in August 1883. The TC&StL had six divisions at this time. Four of the five TC&StL divisions south of Delphos were sold to their bondholders at auction in June 1884, and separate companies were soon organized for three of those: the Dayton and Toledo Railroad, Dayton and Ironton Railroad, and Iron Railway (named Iron Railroad prior to TC&StL receivership). The Toledo-St. Louis line was sold in December 1885 and reorganized as the Toledo, St. Louis and Kansas City Railroad, commonly known as the Clover Leaf Route. In July, George Hafer of Avondale replaced William J. Craig of Toledo as receiver of the Cincinnati Northern Division, allowing it to recover from Craig's deferred maintenance. Hafer obtained a short-term lease from the trustees of the Dodds-Lebanon Junction line (officially the Cincinnati Division), allowing continued access to Dayton. Finally, on June 27, 1885, the Cincinnati Northern Division was sold for $200,000 to its bondholders, who incorporated the Cincinnati, Lebanon and Northern Railway, with Hafer as president, on July 14 and transferred operations on August 1, 1885. The narrow gauge movement of the 1870s had failed, and all the ex-TC&StL lines were converted to standard gauge within the next ten years.

=== CL&N, 1885–1926 ===
Narrow gauge passenger train at Norwood Park (Smith Road), 1887, pulled by Brooks Mogul #6

The newly organized CL&N initially operated a main line from Court Street in Cincinnati to Dayton, leasing the track from Dodds to Lebanon Junction from the Cincinnati Division trustees, and trackage rights over the Dayton and Ironton Railroad (the old 3 ft narrow gauge D&SE line) into Dayton. But the latter was converted to 4 ft 8 1/2 in (1,435 mm) standard gauge in April 1887, and CL&N service was cut back to Dodds, since the operations north of there were unprofitable even when it was able to reach Dayton. (The line from Lebanon to Dodds was leased in 1892 to the company organized to operate north of Dodds.) Avondale Branch operations were discontinued in August 1889, due to competition from the cheaper Mt. Auburn Cable Railway. Under Hafer's leadership, new passenger and freight depots opened on the north side of Court Street in December 1885. In preparation for conversion to standard gauge, the CL&N relaid rail and replaced bridges, including a straight trestle in the Deer Creek Valley, completed in January 1889, in place of a curving old narrow gauge structure. The first standard gauge rails were laid by August 1889 as part of a dual gauge setup south of Idlewild, when the Ohio and North Western Railroad (O&NW, successor to the C&E), which had converted its line to standard gauge, moved its trains from the Little Miami Railroad (Pennsylvania Railroad system) back to the CL&N. Several months later, a third rail was laid north to East Norwood, allowing the O&NW to connect with the Baltimore and Ohio Southwestern Railroad (successor to the M&C). After undertaking more improvements to the alignment, the company completed the conversion of the main line to Lebanon to standard gauge on September 16, 1894, although, until it acquired a full set of standard gauge equipment, much of the commuter service to Blue Ash continued to use the narrow gauge tracks.

Throughout the CL&N's independence, various larger companies were looking to acquire it, mainly for the valuable Court Street terminal property. The most persistent rumor was that the Cincinnati, Jackson and Mackinaw Railroad (CJ&M, later a NYC line) would buy the CL&N as an entrance to Cincinnati. The CJ&M had built south from Michigan to Carlisle, Ohio in 1887, and initially acquired trackage rights over the CH&D to reach Cincinnati. Negotiations between the CL&N and CJ&M convinced the CH&D that the latter was capable of becoming a strong competitor, despite its poor financial state, and the CH&D attempted to acquire the CJ&M in 1892. But the CL&N stopped the consolidation based on Ohio's laws prohibiting such anti-competitive practices, and the CJ&M continued to look at the CL&N as a possible part of its line. After the CL&N's conversion to standard gauge was completed in 1894, the CJ&M secured trackage rights over the CL&N into Court Street, beginning service on January 27, 1896 via an extension from Carlisle to Franklin, the Cleveland, Cincinnati, Chicago and St. Louis Railway (Big Four, later a NYC line) to Middletown, and the recently opened Middletown and Cincinnati Railroad to the CL&N at Hageman. The CJ&M also acquired the long-dormant Deer Creek Tunnel project in an attempt to construct its own route into the city, tired of dealing with Hafer and the CL&N. The Pennsylvania Railroad, owner of the Little Miami Railroad that had been constructed east of Lebanon in the 1840s, entered the negotiations in 1896 to protect its Cincinnati-area interests, and in March it (through the Pennsylvania Company) acquired a majority of the CL&N's stock. Pennsylvania officials took over management in May, and in 1902 the CL&N acquired the tunnel property and some terminal property near Court Street from the Cincinnati Northern Railroad, successor to the CJ&M, which had become part of the Big Four and terminated its use of the CL&N in 1901.

As a part of the Pennsylvania system, the CL&N continued to operate its own property (which included the line north of Dodds after 1914) until January 1, 1921, when it was leased to the Pennsylvania. Starting at the end of 1918, the Interstate Commerce Commission classified the CL&N as a Class I railroad, meaning that it made at least $1 million per year in operating revenue. (This designation was dropped in 1921 when the CL&N was leased.) However, net operating income, revenue minus costs, which had steadily climbed from the 1890s, began falling in 1916, becoming a deficit in 1920. Subsequently, effective January 1, 1926, the Pennsylvania merged the CL&N with several other small companies—the Cleveland, Akron and Cincinnati Railway, Manufacturers Railway, Pennsylvania-Detroit Railroad, and Toledo, Columbus and Ohio River Railroad—to create the Pennsylvania, Ohio and Detroit Railroad, a non-operating subsidiary. That company was merged into the Connecting Railway, previously a short link in Philadelphia, PA, in 1956, and its lessee merged with the New York Central Railroad in 1968 to form Penn Central Transportation.

=== Other lines, 1889–1915 ===
The 16.96-mile (27.29 km) line north of Dodds, built by the TD&B to connect the Cincinnati Northern to the D&SE at Lebanon Junction, was sold separately at the June 1884 foreclosure sale, to its first-mortgage bondholders for $20,000. Initially operated under lease by the CL&N, service was discontinued in April 1887 when the ex-D&SE was converted from 3 ft (914 mm) narrow gauge to 4 ft 8 1/2 in (1,435 mm) standard gauge. With its northern connection gone, and no on-line sources of revenue, there was no profit in operating the line. However, one such source would soon be created, when local businessman Henry Lewis decided to purchase nearby "Dayton limestone" quarries at Centerville. He bought the abandoned rail line from the bondholders' trustees for $40,000 in December 1888, and in January 1889 organized the Dayton, Lebanon and Cincinnati Railroad (DL&C). Extensions on both ends were planned, north into downtown Dayton and south to a standard gauge connection. Lewis finished converting the 3 ft (914 mm) narrow gauge line to standard gauge in January 1891, and initially leased it to the Dayton, Fort Wayne and Chicago Railway, successor to the D&SE. He leased in 1890 and later bought land in Dayton for the proposed terminal, and in early 1892 he acquired the quarries at Centerville, giving the line its source of traffic. The DL&C bought the line from Lewis in March 1892 for $189,000 in stock, and in June it acquired a lease on the CL&N's 5.52-mile (8.88 km) line between Dodds and Lebanon. After converting the track to standard gauge, the DL&C began operations into Lebanon in late December 1892. However, it was unable to negotiate trackage rights with the Cincinnati, Dayton and Ironton Railroad (the latest name for the ex-D&SE), and only operated north to Lebanon Junction, where passengers could transfer to that company's trains into Dayton. Throughout its life, the DL&C competed with the CL&N wherever possible; for example, the CL&N advertised (along with the Middletown and Cincinnati Railroad and Big Four) a faster route between Lebanon and Dayton via Hageman and Middletown.

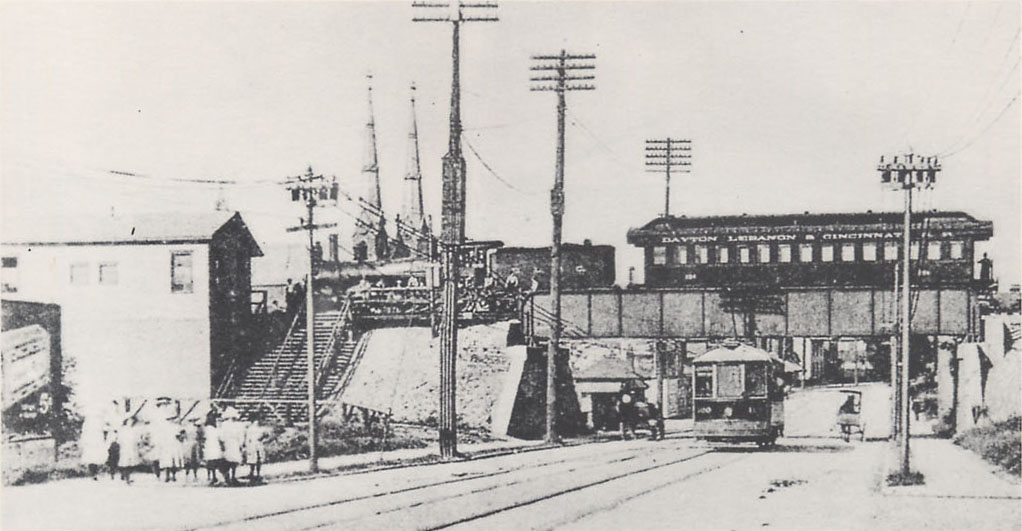
DL&C train at Washington Street, 1912

Lewis died in 1893, and in the next decade the DL&C built no new lines. However, a group of investors bought the company, including the Dayton terminal property, in 1901 for $250,000 from Lewis's heirs. The first segment of the line into downtown Dayton was completed in late 1902, branching off the main line at Hempstead and ending at Lambeth, site of the Dayton State Hospital. Unable to obtain a franchise from Dayton, and still unprofitable, the DL&C entered receivership in January 1905, and was sold at foreclosure in April 1907 and reorganized in May as the Dayton, Lebanon and Cincinnati Railroad and Terminal Company. The bondholders who had organized the new company succeeded in obtaining the franchise, and sold the stock to a new group of investors in January 1909. Construction was restarted in April, and in November the branch reached the intersection of Brown and Caldwell Streets and the National Cash Register plant. Finally, after completing the cuts and fills required along the east bank of the Great Miami River, the DL&C opened its new main line in 1912, to a passenger depot on the north side of Washington Street, several blocks south and west of the city's main Union Station. A freight depot was located just to the north, at Eaker Street, and just beyond was an interchange track (not part of the original line) connecting to the Cincinnati, Hamilton and Dayton Railway (B&O system) and, via that line, the Pittsburgh, Cincinnati, Chicago and St. Louis Railway (Panhandle Route, part of the Pennsylvania system).

The other line eventually acquired by the CL&N was the Middletown and Cincinnati Railway (M&C, not to be confused with the Marietta and Cincinnati Railroad discussed earlier). Paul J. Sorg, owner of a tobacco plant east of Middletown, was unhappy with the service provided by the Cincinnati, Hamilton and Dayton Railroad (then independent) and Cincinnati and Springfield Railway (Big Four system), both of which bypassed the center of town. Sorg and associates incorporated the M&C in early 1890, and surveyed a 14.23 miles (22.90 km) line from Middletown, which lay in the Great Miami River valley, southeast to a point that would be known as Middletown Junction on the Little Miami Railroad (Pennsylvania system). Construction on the majority of the route, which crossed the CL&N at Hageman, was complete by September 1891, and a 365-foot (111 m) truss bridge over the Little Miami River opened in early 1892, linking the line to the Pennsylvania. Access into central Middletown was delayed until December, when it was finally able to cross the CH&D to its depot. As opposed to the CL&N and DL&C, the M&C was straight and flat, giving a smooth ride, and turned a reasonable profit. The revenue was not enough, however, to pay off the bonds, and the M&C entered receivership in July 1894. The holders of liens against the property bought the line at foreclosure in October for $335,000, incorporated the Middletown and Cincinnati Railroad in December, and elected Sorg president.

Sorg died on May 28, 1902, and six days later the CL&N, owned by the Pennsylvania since 1896, bought its property for $400,000 and began operating it as a branch. The DL&C would be acquired twelve years later, after the Great Dayton Flood of 1913. The CL&N and DL&C, built on the highlands between the river valleys, combined to provide the only access into Dayton during the disaster. The Pennsylvania realized that the DL&C would make a good acquisition in the event of future flooding, and had the CL&N buy and begin operating the DL&C for about $700,000 in December 1914. (Through service between Cincinnati and Dayton had begun that summer.) The DL&C built a short connection from Lebanon Junction to the Panhandle Route at Clement in early 1915, and on July 1 its property became that of the CL&N.

=== Abandonments, 1917–1975 ===
Competition from interurbans, specifically the Cincinnati-Lebanon Interurban Railway and Terminal Company, took away passengers from the CL&N beginning in 1903. But the interurban began to decline, going out of business in 1922, and it was motor vehicles that would kill the CL&N's passenger service. The first line to go was the Middletown Branch, discontinued in 1917; the short branch to Montgomery became freight-only in 1926. All service north of Lebanon ended in 1928, and in 1931 only one mixed train between Court Street and Lebanon was left on the schedule.

The less-convenient Cincinnati Union Terminal replaced Court Street in 1933, as agreed upon by all railroads participating in its construction. CL&N trains reached the station via trackage rights on the Baltimore and Ohio Railroad (ex-M&C) south of East Norwood. This was never popular among CL&N riders, and the last scheduled passenger train on the former CL&N ran on January 31, 1934.

With passenger service gone, and several cross-connections to other Pennsylvania lines, the CL&N was no longer needed as a through route. Several years after the Montgomery Branch was fully abandoned in 1933, the Pennsylvania discontinued freight service between Blue Ash and Mason and between Lebanon and Lytle; trains continued to reach Lebanon via the Little Miami Railroad and Middletown Branch. Service was resumed on the entire line during World War II, but the Lebanon-Lytle segment was torn up in 1952.

After the Pennsylvania merged into Penn Central in 1968, a 3-mile (4.8 km) piece north from Brecon was again abandoned, as was the short piece of the Middletown Branch east of the main line at Hageman, with Lebanon service now coming from the ex-New York Central at Middletown. The line through the Deer Creek Valley into Court Street was also abandoned, and the old freight depot was torn down in 1975.

=== Sales, 1975–present ===
When the Consolidated Rail Corporation (Conrail) acquired the assets of the bankrupt Penn Central in 1976, it was allowed to choose which lines to keep and which to abandon. The line between Avondale and Brecon still saw heavy freight traffic, and there would still be a reasonable amount of traffic to Mason and Hempstead. Thus Conrail bought about half of the ex-CL&N, including the main line from Cincinnati to Brecon (Blue Ash Secondary Track), Mason to Hageman (Mason Secondary Track), Hempstead to Pasadena (Kettering Running Track), and Patterson Road to Dayton (DP&L Industrial Track), as well as Middletown to Hageman (Middletown Secondary) and Hempstead to Clement (Clement Running Track).

Ownership of the remaining segments—Brecon to Mason, Hageman to Lebanon, Lytle to Hempstead, Pasadena to Patterson Road, and Hageman to Middletown Junction—remained with the Penn Central trustees, although, with local funding, Conrail operated the two segments from Hageman to Lebanon and Centerville to Hempstead as "light density lines". Tracks between Lytle and Centerville were torn up in 1979. Since then, several more segments have been abandoned, including Avondale to McCullough and Centerville to Kettering.

Short line Indiana and Ohio Railway (IORY) acquired most of the remainder in the 1980s, beginning operations from Monroe (near Middletown) to Mason and Lebanon in March 1985, and McCullough to Brecon in December 1986. The city of Lebanon has bought the Hageman-Lebanon segment, initially owned by the Penn Central trustees, and the Southwest Ohio Regional Transit Authority acquired the property between McCullough and Brecon in 1997 for a proposed public transit line. (IORY continues to operate freight on both these segments.)

The IORY began running tourist trains on the Lebanon segment in 1985. The passenger operations were split in 1996, going through several renamings to Turtle Creek Valley Railway, Turtle Creek and Lebanon Railway, and finally Lebanon Mason Monroe Railroad. Three short segments of line at Middletown and Dayton remained with Conrail until its 1999 breakup, when the Norfolk Southern Railway acquired Conrail's assets in southwestern Ohio.

As of 2022, two segments on the southern part of the former line are in use by IORY as the Blue Ash Subdivision and Mason Subdivision, with a gap between them, while a short section of its northernmost extent is used as a siding by Norfolk Southern. The rest of the track has been removed, although the right-of-way is discernible in places.

== Route description ==
Lying on the highlands between the Little and Great Miami Rivers, the CL&N was commonly known as the "Highland Route". While it normally received only local traffic, its location was a distinct advantage during floods. This was first demonstrated during the Flood of 1884, when the rising Ohio River cut off all other railroads from downtown Cincinnati. But the load was too much for the 3 ft (914 mm) narrow gauge TC&StL, and several companies switched to Miami and Erie Canal boats to make the connections until the waters subsided. Similar Cincinnati floods happened in 1883, 1897, 1898, 1907, and 1937, but in 1913 the Great Dayton Flood inundated that city, then lying at the north end of the independent DL&C. That company had just completed its line into downtown Dayton, when, less than a year later, the Loramie Reservoir broke through its levees and sent a swell of water through down the Great Miami River and into the city. As with the Cincinnati floods, only the CL&N and DL&C were unaffected, and relief supplies were sent north from Cincinnati via Lebanon to the National Cash Register plant.

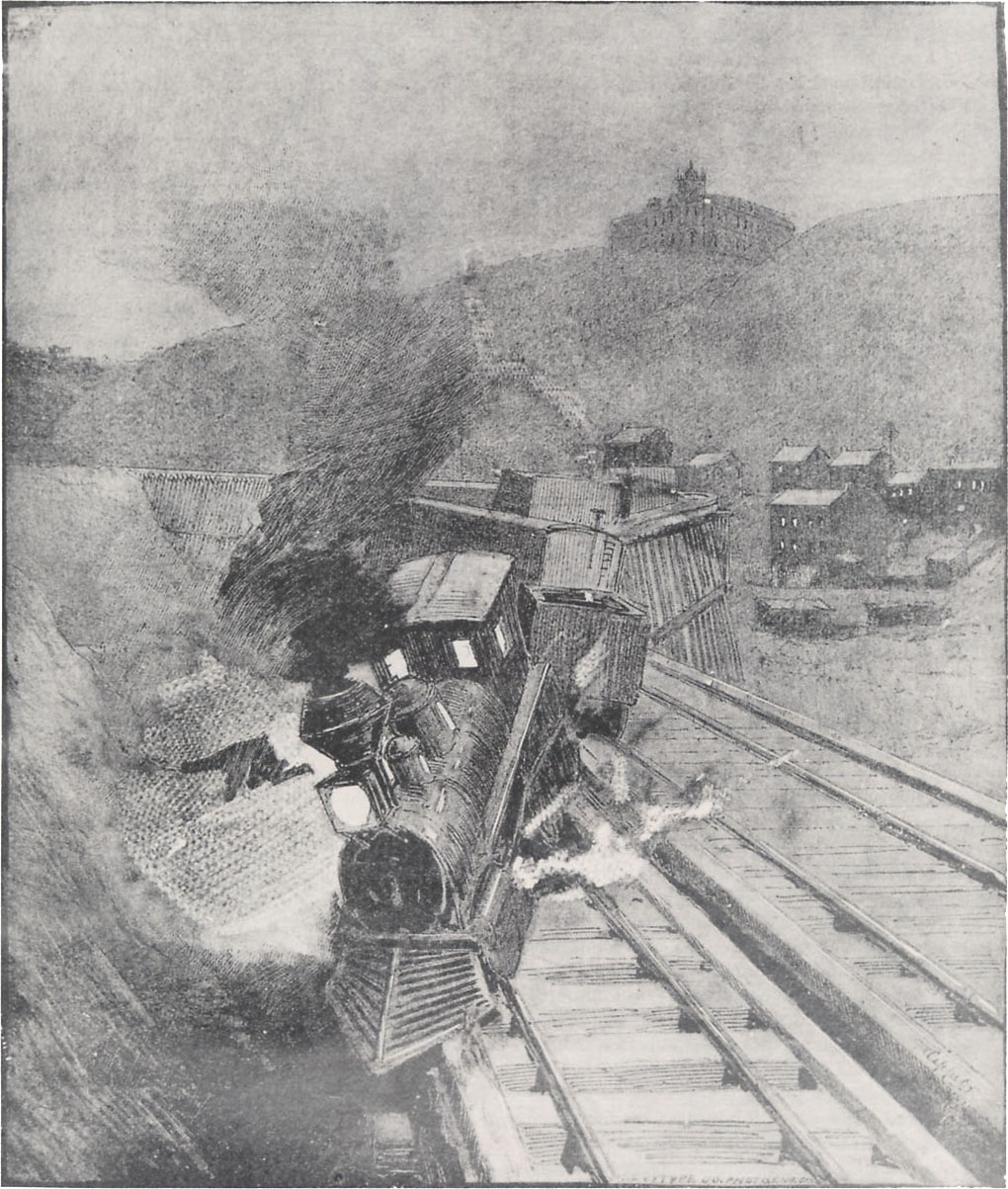
Sketch of an 1885 wreck on the longer S-shaped trestle, looking north

The line began on the east side of downtown Cincinnati, at the corner of Eggleston Avenue and Court Street. The site of the brick freight depot, closed in 1969 and demolished in 1975, is now owned by Greyhound Lines, which uses it as an intercity bus terminal. A track built in 1887 crossed Court Street, connecting with the Little Miami Railroad's Eggleston Avenue Connection for freight transfer. The line began by climbing the Deer Creek Valley, the only feasible rail entrance to downtown Cincinnati that did not follow a river valley. When the railroad was built in the late 1870s, the valley was used by the city as a dump. An 1852 city ordinance provided for raising the ground level, beginning with the raising of Court Street by as much as 50 feet (15 m). To follow the eventual surface level and avoid the steep hillsides, the railroad was built on trestles for much of its ascent, with a maximum grade of 3.5%. After leaving the depot, the line traversed an S-shaped trestle to the east side of the valley, before crossing Elsinore Place and Eden Park Drive at grade, with a second trestle between these streets. (The former was replaced in January 1889 with a straighter single-track trestle.) A bridge took the line over Florence Avenue, and it then passed through the neighborhood of Mount Auburn before passing under the summit through the cut-and-cover Oak Street Tunnel north of McMillan Street. The line started its gradual descent as it left the tunnel, generally following the existing ground level and crossing streets at grade.

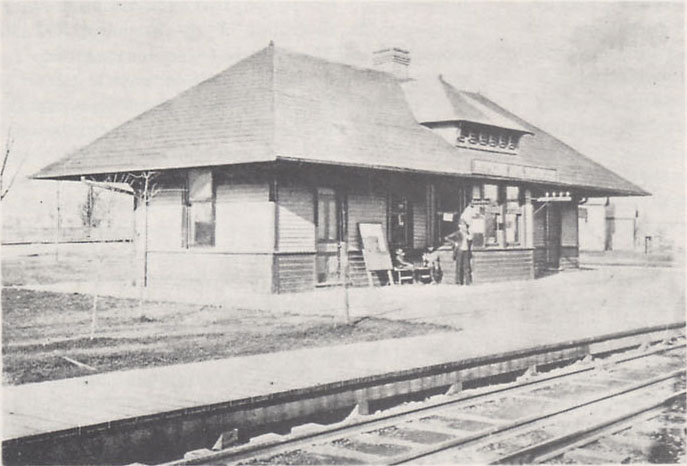
Hopkins Avenue depot in Norwood, early 1890s

Double tracks initially stretched from Court Street to near Fredonia Avenue, where the 1.25-mile (2.01 km) Avondale Branch split for the Cincinnati Zoo. When the line was converted to 4 ft 8 1/2 in (1,435 mm) standard gauge in 1894, the tunnel and McMillan Street underpass were not wide enough for a double-track line, yet two standard gauge tracks were laid side-by-side. After an accident in 1916, the tracks were relaid as a gauntlet track. The trestles were rebuilt as single-track in 1888 and 1889, after which double track extended only from Eden Park Drive to Avondale. Due to increased passenger traffic, the line was re-widened not only south to Court Street but also north to Norwood from 1902 to 1904, once the valley had been filled in. Beyond Avondale, the CL&N descended through Idlewild, where two Norfolk and Western Railway lines diverged—the Cincinnati and Eastern Railway east to Portsmouth and the Cincinnati Connecting Belt Railroad northwest to a junction near Elmwood Place. The railway began to climb again at East Norwood, where it crossed the Marietta and Cincinnati Railroad (Baltimore and Ohio Railroad), reaching the flat highlands at Deer Park. In the late 1880s, the CL&N, with its frequent commuter service, contributed to the development of suburbs along its line including Idlewild, East Norwood, Silverton, Deer Park, and Hazelwood. At Hopkins Avenue in Norwood, commuters unsatisfied with the bare platform built by the railroad company raised $1500 to build a station building, which opened on August 1, 1888, and was owned by the Hopkins Avenue Depot Company until service ended in the 1930s. It was later used as a gas station, and now houses a chiropractor. As part of its bicentennial celebration, the city of Silverton built a replica of its former CL&N station with a museum inside.

Just beyond East Norwood, the Pennsylvania built McCullough Yard in 1927, improving switching operations for the growing industrial base in Norwood. A connection was included to the Pennsylvania's Chicago-bound Richmond Branch, which the CL&N crossed over north of the yard. In Butler County, north of Brecon, the CL&N curved abruptly northeast onto the original line, partially graded in the 1850s between Sharonville and Lebanon. Just beyond, it began to descend slowly through Mason to Hageman, where it crossed the Middletown Branch, and then rose slightly, alongside Turtle Creek, to Lebanon. The Pennsylvania tore down the original Lebanon passenger station in 1960, replacing it (for freight purposes) with a smaller building from Kings Mills on the Little Miami Railroad. The Lebanon Council of Garden Clubs acquired the land in 1972, tore down the freight depot, and erected a replica of the old passenger depot in its place, with a gift shop inside.

Leaving Lebanon, the line ascended a small gully and then headed north-northeasterly across the highlands to Dodds. The never-used grade from Dodds to Waynesville descended into the Little Miami River valley via Newman Run before turning north and ending at the latter village. Portions of the right-of-way and stone abutments for several never-built bridges remain on what is now farmland. The line as completed turned north at Dodds, and required several cuts and fills to traverse the rolling terrain. At Hempstead, just north of Hempstead Road, the line split. The original route continued north, parallel to Woodman Drive, to the old Dayton and South Eastern Railroad (now the Iron Horse Trail) at Lebanon Junction. A 1915 extension was built parallel to the ex-D&SE, and ended at the Panhandle Route (now the Creekside Trail to the east) at Clement. Part of this line is still operated by the Norfolk Southern Railway, and to the south the right-of-way is being used for an extension of the Iron Horse Trail. The other branch headed northwesterly into downtown Dayton, steadily descending as it passed south of the University of Dayton and alongside the Great Miami River. The main passenger and freight depots were at Washington Street, which the CL&N passed over on the first such grade separation in Dayton. The first freight depot opened with the line in 1912, and was replaced in 1930 by a larger structure, itself torn down in 1966.

== Presidents ==
- J. P. Gilchrist (1852–1861)
- Seth Silver Haines (1874–1879)
- Nathan Keever (receiver, 1879–1880)
- John M. Corse of the TD&B (1880–1882)
- Elijah B. Phillips of the TC&StL (1883)
- William J. Craig (receiver, 1883–1884)
- George Hafer (receiver, 1884–1885; president, 1885–1896)

Joseph Wood was the first of at least two Pennsylvania Railroad men elected president after that company gained control in 1896.

== Equipment ==
When the CL&N converted to 4 ft 8 1/2 in (1,435 mm) standard gauge in 1894, it initially mounted its 3 ft (914 mm) narrow gauge passenger cars on standard gauge trucks. These were replaced with standard gauge cars after the Pennsylvania acquisition in 1896.

The first locomotive on the line, a Baldwin 4-4-0 named "Warren County No. 1", was bought in 1877 by the Miami Valley Railway. In all, the CL&N and predecessors had nine narrow gauge locomotives, bought from four different manufacturers. Two were disposed of in the 1880s, and, of the seven remaining into the 1890s, six provided main line service and one was used as a switching and helper locomotive.

No.	Builder	Construct- tion no.	Date ordered	Wheel arrange- ment	Cylinders	Driver diameter	Engine weight	TC&StL no. (1883–84)	Notes
1	Baldwin	4207	December 1877	4-4-0	12×18 in (460 mm)	42 in (1,100 mm)	42,650 lb (19,350 kg)	2	Named "Warren County No. 1" after the county containing Lebanon
2	Baldwin	4292	About January 1881	4-4-0	12×18 in (460 mm)	42 in (1,100 mm)	42,650 lb (19,350 kg)	4	Ordered January 1878 by Chicago and Tomah Railroad but not delivered; March 1878 by Miami Valley Railway but not delivered; delivered to Eastern Railroad of Long Island in July 1879 and named "Leila"; sold to Cincinnati Northern in about January 1881 and named "Manhattan" after its former home (Long Island is near the borough of Manhattan)
3	Porter	401	November 1880	2-4-0	10×16 in (410 mm)		28,000 lb (13,000 kg)	96	Sold about 1888; named "Col. O.J. Dodds" after Ozro J. Dodds of the TD&B; used for light duty
4	Mason	645	March 1881	2-6-6T	13×16 in (410 mm)	37.5 in (950 mm)	72,000 lb (33,000 kg)	54	Wrecked February 15, 1883; similar design to the Mason Bogies used on the Denver, South Park and Pacific Railroad
5	Mason	581	Spring 1881	0-4-4T	12×16 in (410 mm)	42 in (1,100 mm)	40,000 lb (18,000 kg)	55	Named "Admiral Almy"; ordered April 1877 by New York and Manhattan Beach Railway; refurbished and sold to Cincinnati Northern in spring 1881; used for switching at Court Street and as a helper on the grade just to the north
6	Brooks	610	November 1881	2-6-0	14×18 in (460 mm)	41 in (1,000 mm)	46,000 lb (21,000 kg)	56	Ordered November 1881 by Cincinnati and Eastern Railway, but delivered to Cincinnati Northern
7	Brooks	659	February 1882	2-6-0	14×18 in (460 mm)	41 in (1,000 mm)	46,000 lb (21,000 kg)	77	
8	Brooks	937	June 1883	2-6-0	15×18 in (460 mm)	37 in (940 mm)	48,000 lb (22,000 kg)	96	
9	Brooks	941	July 1883	2-6-0	15×18 in (460 mm)	37 in (940 mm)	48,000 lb (22,000 kg)	97	

Standard gauge operations began in 1894 with five locomotives, and the narrow gauge equipment was kept temporarily for commuter runs to Blue Ash. Later acquisitions, as well as consolidations with other companies, raised the number to 23 in 1920, its final year of independent operation.

== Station list ==
Mileage from Cincinnati	Name	Notes
0.0	Cincinnati, OH (Court Street Station)	Junction Eggleston Avenue Connection (0.9 miles to junction Undercliff Branch)
0.9	Eden Park	Closed by 1926
1.4–1.5	(Oak Street Tunnel)	
1.8	Oak Street (Walnut Hills)	
2	Shillito Street	Closed by 1903
2.1	Avondale	Earlier Avondale Junction; junction Avondale Branch
3	Woodward Avenue	Closed by 1903
3.6	Idlewild	Junction N&W
4.2	Ivanhoe	
4.5	Hopkins Avenue	
4.9	Norwood	Earlier Norwood Park
5.3	East Norwood	Earlier Norwood; junction B&O
6.1	McCullough	Junction Richmond Branch
6.4	Lester	
6.7	Pleasant Ridge	
7.4	Kennedy Heights	Earlier Kennedy
8.1	Euclid	
8.6	Silverton	Earlier Moselle
9.1	Deer Park	
9.9	Beechwood	
10.4	Rossmoyne	Earlier Ballou
11.0	Terra Alta	
11.7	Blue Ash	Earlier Hafer; junction Montgomery Branch (1.4 miles to Montgomery)
13.5	Winslow Park	
14.4	Hazelwood	Earlier Rowena
15.4	Brecon	Earlier Wheeler
16	Morrison	Earlier Troas; closed by 1903
18.3	Miltomson	Earlier Aldine
21.4	Mason	
23.4	Stokes	Earlier Shakerton
24.9	Hageman	Earlier Gravel Pit; junction Middletown Branch
26.8	Turtle Creek	Earlier Avoca
29.4	Lebanon	
32	Lelan	Earlier Genntown; closed by 1926
35.3	Dodds	Earlier Utica
	Kitchener	Closed by 1926
37.7	Venable	
39.2	Edgewood	
40.3	Lytle	
42.4	Manor	
45.1	Centerville	
47.4	Oak Ridge	
48.9	Hempstead	Junction Hempstead Branch (5.1 miles to Clement, junction Dayton Branch)
50.4	Pasadena	
53.8	National (NCR plant)	At Brown Street
55.2	Dayton (Washington Street)	
55.5	Dayton	Junction Dayton Union Railway (0.3 miles to Union Station)
