= Warren County Canal =

A sketch of a canalboat by Herbert Fall from circa 1840, about the time the canal operated

The Warren County Canal was a branch of the Miami and Erie Canal in southwestern Ohio about 20 miles (32 km) in length that connected the Warren County seat of Lebanon to the main canal at Middletown in the mid-19th century. Lebanon was at the crossroads of two major roads, the highway from Cincinnati to Columbus (later U.S. Route 42) and the road from Chillicothe to the College Township (Oxford), but Lebanon businessmen and civic leaders wanted better transportation facilities and successfully lobbied for their own canal, part of the canal fever of the first third of the 19th century. The Warren County Canal was never successful, operating less than a decade before the state abandoned it.

== History ==
=== A private company begins ===
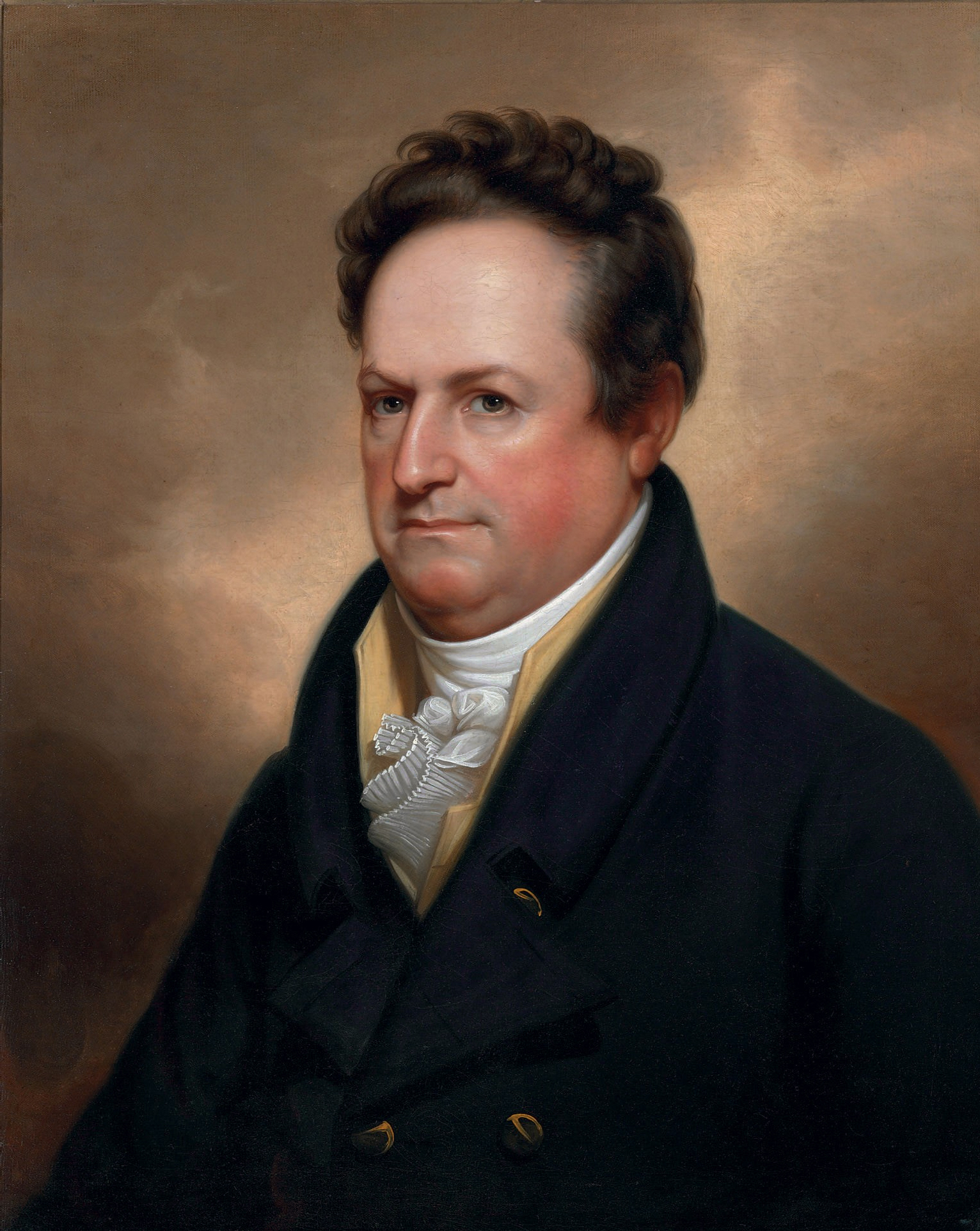
Governor DeWitt Clinton of New York, who gave Warren County "canal fever" when he visited in 1829

The Miami and Erie Canal was authorized by the Ohio General Assembly in 1825. Work began that same year and the canal was navigable from the Ohio River at Cincinnati to Middletown in December 1827. By April 1830, it was open to Dayton. (The entire length to Lake Erie at Toledo opened in 1845.) New York Governor DeWitt Clinton, who was the driving force behind his state's Erie Canal, came to Ohio in 1829 for the groundbreaking ceremonies of the Miami and Erie Canal, which were held in Middletown. On his trip to the Buckeye State, he visited Lebanon, staying at the Golden Lamb Inn. The village's inhabitants caught the "canal fever" of the day and demanded they too have access to the new waterway. The State quickly obliged.

On February 22, 1830, the Ohio General Assembly incorporated a private corporation to construct and operate the branch to Lebanon, the Warren County Canal Company. The company projected the work would cost $123,861, but work progressed slowly on the canal and the company eventually acknowledged it could not complete it. By the act of February 20, 1836, the General Assembly ordered the Canal Commissioners to take possession of the unfinished canal and to complete it. The State paid the Canal Company 50% of its expenditures to that point; the company had spent $21,742.33. The Canal Commissioners estimated it would take $128,000 to finish the project, a sum which proved inadequate. The State spent a total of $217,552 for both acquiring and completing the branch.

=== The canal opens ===
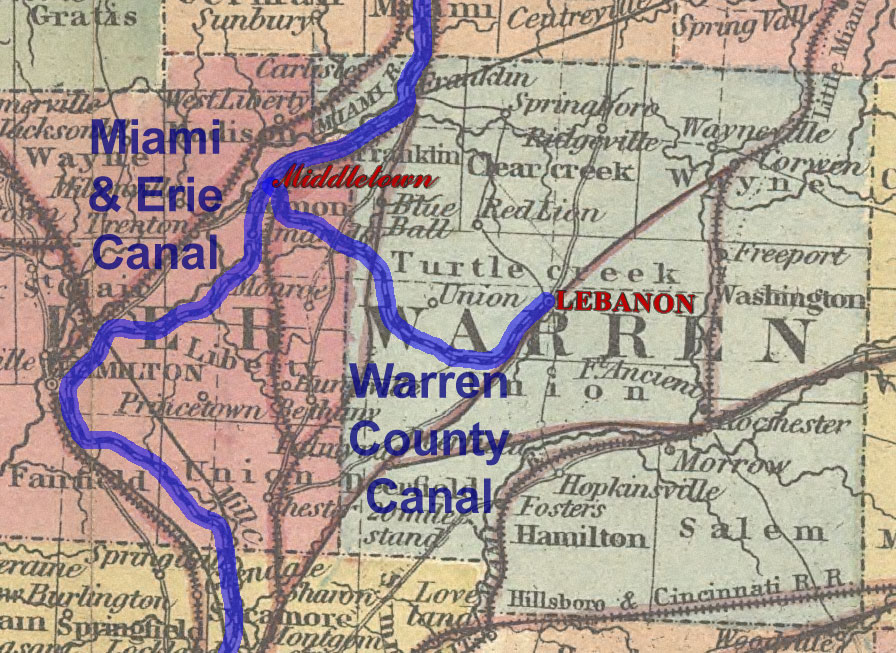
The Warren County Canal was a spur of the Miami and Erie Canal to Lebanon, the county seat of Warren County, Ohio

Location of Warren County, Ohio

The Warren County Canal was made completely navigable in 1840, it having reached Lock 2 near Lebanon on March 15, 1839. The canal, 40 feet (12 m) wide plus a 10-foot-wide (3.0 m) towpath, began at Middletown between Miami and Erie Lock 31 (Dine's) and 32 (Middletown) at Mile 208. (Mile 0 was on Lake Erie at Toledo, Mile 250 was on the Ohio River at Cincinnati.) This site is about 200 feet (61 m) south of the present Central Avenue; Verity Parkway follows the old path of the Miami and Erie (39°30′55.7″N 84°24′08.6″W). The canal was supplied by a feeder off the Miami and Erie Canal 3 miles (4.8 km) north at Mile 205 between Lock 29 (Upper Greenland) and Lock 30 (Lower Greenland), south of the Miami Dam. The canal there consumed water at the rate of 1800 cubic feet per minute (850 L/s) (per Morrow's History) or 2000 cubic feet per minute (940 L/s) (per the Historical and Biographical Cyclopaedia).

From Middletown, the canal went southeast, through the gentle country the Middletown and Cincinnati Railroad would follow decades later, land filled with sand and gravel deposited by the Wisconsinan Glaciation 14,000 to 24,000 years ago. This geology meant the canal leaked considerably. It proceeded through Lemon Township north of the place later called Oakland. Two aqueducts carried the canal over Dick's Creek, near the intersection of Cincinnati-Dayton Road (the Dixie Highway) and Greentree Road, the state road to the College Township (the aqueducts proved too shallow for use by heavily laden canal boats). It crossed from Butler County into Warren County just north of the northern boundary of the Symmes Purchase, a point today in the city limits of Monroe, near Shaker Run.

The canal continued its path southeast into Turtlecreek and Union townships, along the path of Muddy Creek to about where Hagemans Crossing later was on the Cincinnati and Lebanon Pike (U.S. Route 42). There it turned northeast, paralleling Turtle Creek) and crossing it on an aqueduct, approximately the route later taken by the Cincinnati, Lebanon and Northern Railway between Mason and Lebanon. At Lebanon, there was a turning basin in the space bounded by Sycamore Street, South Street, Turtle Creek and Cincinnati Avenue (U.S. Route 42) (approximately 39°25′55″N 84°12′41″W). The canal was fed from water from the North and East Forks of Turtle Creek at Lebanon. The North Fork was dammed by a 100-foot-long (30 m) earth dam to create a 40-acre (16 ha) (per Morrow's History) to 45-acre (18 ha) reservoir (per Bogen's "Warren County Canal").

Lebanon was 44 feet (13 m) above the elevation of the Miami and Erie Canal at Middletown. Six locks, each 90 feet (27 m) long and 15 feet (4.6 m) wide, were necessary to overcome this. Lock 1 was at the foot of Clay Street in Lebanon. Lock 2 was a short distance downstream, still in Lebanon. Lock 3 was about a mile (2 km) southwest of Lebanon near Glosser Road and Turtle Creek. Lock 4 was about 3 miles (5 km) southwest of Lebanon near the confluence of Muddy Creek and Turtle Creek and what was later Hillcrest and Hagemans Crossing. These locks raised and lowered boats a total of 28 feet (8.5 m). At Lock 3, Joseph Whitehill, later Ohio State Treasurer, operated a grist mill, having purchased water power from the State.

Lock 5 was near the intersection of Greentree and Cincinnati-Dayton Roads, where the feeder canal from the Miami and Erie Canal entered. Lock 6 was at Middletown, near where the canal debouched into the Miami and Erie Canal. These two locks raised and lowered boats the remaining 16 feet (5 m), 8 feet (2 m) by each lock.

=== Shaker Run wrecks the canal ===
In 1848 the stream Shaker Run forever damaged the canal. Shaker Run, in western Turtlecreek Township, drained the large swamp on the Shaker settlement at Union Village. The stream frequently jumped its banks and flooded the canal, depositing sediment that required constant dredging and repairs. Finally, Shaker Run broke through the canal's embankment.

In 1852, John W. Erwin, the resident engineer of the Miami and Erie Canal, investigated repairs to the canal by direction of the General Assembly, that body having requested an estimate of the cost of repairs and an opinion on whether the canal should be abandoned. He submitted a report to the State Board of Public Works which estimated $31,613, would be needed to repair the Warren County Canal. Of that sum, $16,896 was needed just for dredging. Because the canal had been little used, the State declined to repair it. In the General Assembly, Representative Durbin Ward of Lebanon introduced legislation to abandon the "Lebanon Ditch." In 1854, the state sold the remnants for $40,000 to John W. Corwin and R.H. Henderson.

The large stones of the locks were used in local buildings, especially the Lebanon Opera House, which burned on Christmas Day, 1932 and occupied the site of the present Lebanon City Hall at Broadway and Main Street. Other stones were used in the bridge across the North Fork. The reservoir on the North Fork of Turtle Creek collapsed in a violent rainstorm on July 10, 1882, causing much damage in Lebanon, including washing out the bridge on Broadway over Turtle Creek. The site was later taken over by the French Bauer Dairy. After it closed around 1970, the City of Lebanon acquired the land, eventually turning it into Colonial Park.

Little remains of the canal today, chiefly a few ditches on State Route 63 in Turtlecreek Township east of Monroe near the Lebanon Correctional Institution and Warren Correctional Institution.
