= Cincinnati Northern Railroad =

Cincinnati Northern Railroad or Cincinnati Northern Railway may refer to:

- Cincinnati Northern Railroad (1894–1938) in Ohio and Michigan, later part of the New York Central Railroad
- Cincinnati Northern Railway (1880–1883) in Ohio, later part of the Pennsylvania Railroad
