= Cincinnati Northern Railroad (1894–1938) =

American railway

Cincinnati Northern Railroad (red) as of 1918

The Cincinnati Northern Railroad was a railroad that stretched from Franklin, Ohio (near Cincinnati), north to Jackson, Michigan, a distance of about 186 miles (299 km). It was acquired by the Cleveland, Cincinnati, Chicago and St. Louis Railway in 1901 and the New York Central Railroad several years later. Most of the line has since been abandoned.

== History ==
In the 1850s, a line was surveyed and partially graded from Cincinnati north to Van Wert, but construction was halted by the Panic of 1857. Construction on a north–south line through Ohio's western tier of counties did not begin again until the 1870s. The Van Wert, Paulding and Michigan Railway was incorporated in December 1874 to build a short branch from the Toledo, Wabash and Western Railway (at Cecil) to Paulding. However, the Paulding and Cecil Railway was incorporated for the same purpose in December 1879, and opened in September 1880.

Another short segment of the future Cincinnati Northern was built by the Celina, Van Wert and State Line Extension of the Columbus and North–Western Railway, incorporated in May 1878 for the purpose of building a line from Celina north to the state line in Williams County. Near the state line it would meet the Columbus and North–Western Railway, which had been incorporated in 1872 to build from Columbus to the state line in that same county, but was never constructed. The line was built to 3 ft (914 mm) narrow gauge to connect with the growing Toledo, Delphos and Burlington Railroad (TD&B), opening from Van Wert south to Ohio City on the TD&B in August 1879, to the Mercer County line in January 1880, and to Rockford in September 1880, for a total of 13 miles (21 km). At Rockford, it connected to another TD&B branch, which had been completed from Delphos in December 1878; the TD&B finished a line (later part of the main line to Dayton) from that branch at Mercer south to Celina in November 1880. Thus the Celina, Van Wert and State Line had helped to form a line south to Celina, but it ended at Van Wert in the north.

The Cincinnati, Van Wert and Michigan Railroad (CVW&M) was incorporated in January 1881 to complete the 3 ft (914 mm) line, and soon leased the Celina, Van Wert and State Line and Van Wert, Paulding and Michigan. The former was converted to 4 ft 8 1/2 in (1,435 mm) standard gauge on June 4, 1881, and the latter built a line that year from Van Wert north to the county line at Scott. The CVW&M itself, which bought the property of its two lessors later that year, built from Scott north to Paulding and Rockford south to West Manchester before merging with a Michigan corporation, the Jackson and Ohio Railroad (incorporated January 1884), in March 1886, to form the Cincinnati, Jackson and Mackinaw Railroad (CJ&M). That company bought the Paulding and Cecil in May 1887, and that year completed the full line from Addison, Michigan south to Carlisle, Ohio. Trackage rights were initially secured over the Cincinnati, Hamilton and Dayton Railroad (CH&D) from Carlisle into Cincinnati in 1888, but the CJ&M also extended its line from Carlisle to Franklin in 1888, and in January 1896 changed its Cincinnati access to the Cleveland, Cincinnati, Chicago and St. Louis Railway (Big Four) from Franklin to Middletown, the recently opened Middletown and Cincinnati Railroad to Hageman, and the recently standard-gauged Cincinnati, Lebanon and Northern Railway (CL&N) into Cincinnati.

The CJ&M bought a second line from the Michigan and Ohio Railroad in March 1887, stretching from Allegan past the north end of the main line at Addison to Dundee, Michigan. This line, however, was sold at foreclosure to the Toledo and Milwaukee Railroad in 1897, soon after the Jackson and Cincinnati Railway (incorporated 1895, sold 1898) built an extension north to Jackson.

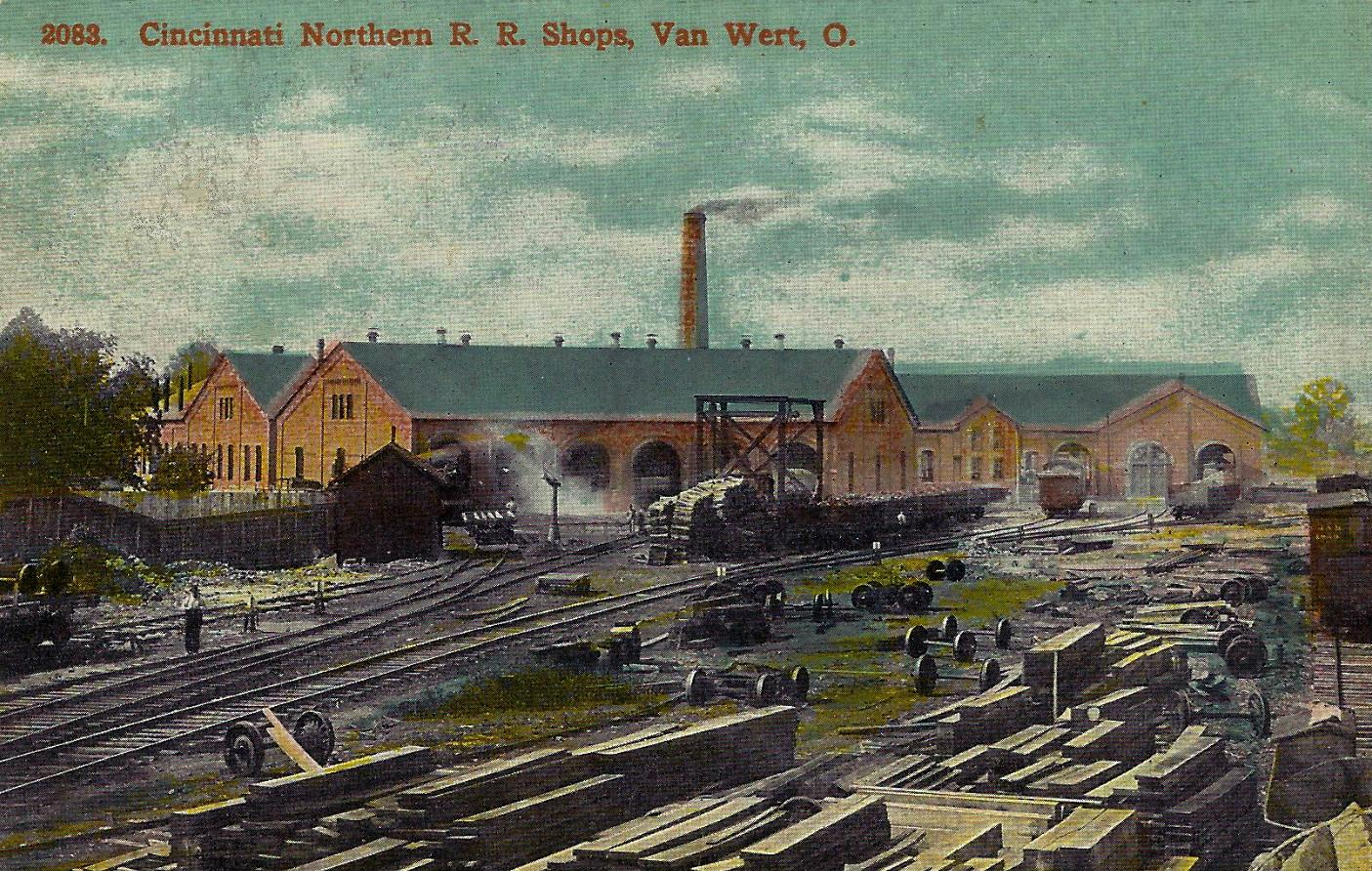
The railroad's shops in Van Wert, Ohio, circa 1914.

The CJ&M was not a profitable enterprise, and went through a reorganization in 1892 as the Cincinnati and Michigan Railroad, immediately merging with the Michigan and Mackinaw Railroad (which had acquired the Allegan-Dundee line) to form the Cincinnati, Jackson and Michigan Railway. Throughout this period, the CJ&M attempted to convince the CH&D to acquire it by threatening to buy the CL&N and thus obtain its own line into Cincinnati. But when the CH&D tried to buy the CJ&M in the early 1890s, the CL&N protested and obtained an injunction due to a state law forbidding anti-competitive mergers. The CJ&M continued to improve its value to a potential purchaser, organizing the Dayton and Cincinnati Terminal Railroad in May 1894 to build a Cincinnati-Dayton line including a long tunnel under Cincinnati's Walnut Hills. Finding that the older Cincinnati Railway Tunnel Company owned such a franchise and an incomplete tunnel, the CJ&M bought up that company's first-mortgage bonds and forced a foreclosure, acquiring the tunnel in May 1896. The new terminal company was renamed the Cincinnati Northern Railroad in December 1894, and bought the CJ&M at its final foreclosure in July 1897. The Big Four subsequently acquired the Cincinnati Northern in 1901, and sold the unused tunnel property, as well as about 10 acres (4.0 ha) of land it had acquired for a Cincinnati terminal, to the CL&N, now owned by the Pennsylvania Railroad, in 1902.

The Cincinnati Northern was formally merged into the Big Four effective June 30, 1938. Since then, most of the line has been abandoned, with only a few short pieces still in place, mostly operated by short lines: Germantown Rail Siding from Carlisle to Germantown, R.J. Corman Railroad/Western Ohio Lines (which is owned by the R.J. Corman short line railroad company) from Greenville to Ansonia, Chicago, Ft. Wayne and Eastern Railroad at Van Wert, and Norfolk Southern Railway at Jackson, MI and Bryan, OH, and Pioneer Railcorp in Cecil, Ohio.
