= Lebanon Countryside Trail =

Rail trail in Ohio

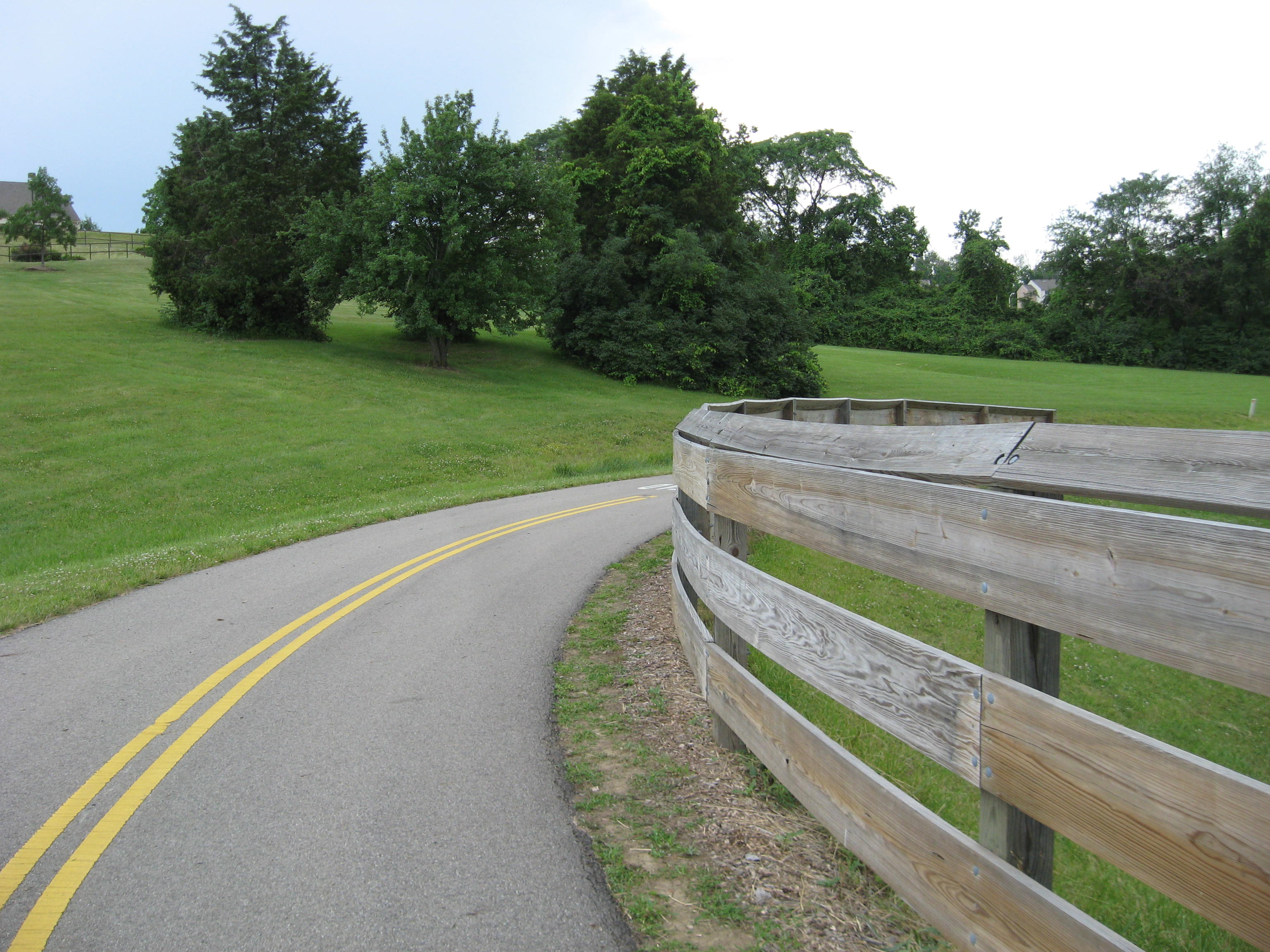
- The northern leg of the trail, near Justice Drive
- Length: 10.2 miles (16.4 km)
- Location: Warren County, Ohio
- Established: 2005
- Trailheads: Little Miami Scenic Trail; Lebanon, Ohio
- Use: Cycling, hiking
- Elevation gain/loss: 257 feet (78 m) gain
- Highest point: 886 ft (270 m)
- Lowest point: 627 ft (191 m)
- Grade: .9%
- Difficulty: Easy
- Surface: Paved asphalt
- Right of way: Middletown and Cincinnati Railroad

Trail map
- Map

The Lebanon Countryside Trail is a rail trail in Ohio.

Largely used as a bicycle trail, it links the city of Lebanon, Ohio to the Little Miami Scenic Trail at Middletown Junction as well as to the Mason Lebanon Bike Connector as part of the Miami-2-Miami trail system. The trail currently extends from Miller Road at the northernmost point to the Little Miami Scenic Trail at the southernmost point.

The trail as of November 2023 is 10.2 miles (16.4 km) long. The trail opened in late 2005 and has been modified/extended multiple times in recent years (2019, 2021, 2022), and will be further modified in 2024 and 2025. In addition to the main trail, a direct connection to the Premier Health Mountain Bike Park exists to cross SR48. Current planned improvements include connecting the trail directly to downtown, improving the shared use path on N. Broadway, and completing a loop around Lebanon OH through Bowman Park.

== Description ==
The trail's main parking lot in Lebanon is at the station of the Cincinnati Railway Company, which operates an excursion train, and is near the Golden Lamb Inn. Going south, the trail follows a series of parks and runs adjacent to SR 48 by the Warren County Government Offices. The trail then crosses Deerfield Road and follows a shared-use path parallel to Deerfield Road to the Countryside YMCA. From there, the trail runs behind neighborhoods and often adjacent to high power lines before merging with a dedicated multi-use path adjacent to Kingsview Drive. This section includes a steep hill. At the bottom of the hill, the path continues adjacent to Kingsview Drive in an industrial park. The multi-use path reaches a fork (near mile marker 1.5) where it continues straight to the Lebanon-Mason connector or left to connect to the Little-Miami trail, just south of South Lebanon.

The alignment of the southernmost portion of the trail runs over the former Middletown and Cincinnati Railroad right-of-way, including the old railroad bridge.

The new section follows sharrows on South Street, Sycamore Street, Silver Street, and Water Street (bypassing downtown) before turning abruptly onto a multi-use trail behind Berry Intermediate School. The trail continues past the new Lebanon Fire Station and turns left onto a dedicated two-way bike lane adjacent to SR48 until Miller Road.

In 2022, the trail was extended from Countryside YMCA south to the bridge at E Turtlecreek Union Road where it now connects both to the housing development north (providing a path across SR48) as well as the Premier Bike Park.

In 2025, the trail will extend East from SR48 using the Multi-use Trail on Monroe Road, across 42, and adjacent to SR48, crossing SR123, and terminating at the current bike trail by the Harmon Disc Golf Course.

== Cautions ==
The trail has two hills that are considerably steeper and longer (8-10 % gradients for ~0.25 miles) than the shallow grades typical of rail trails, and may present a challenge to less-fit cyclists. The hills are co-located with Kingsview Drive and Deerfield Road respectively. Both hills cross those roads at the base of the hill. Stopping at the bottom of the hill may be difficult for inline skaters who lack expert braking skills.

== Map links ==
The trail as of 2018 has a map listed below. (Note: Mile markers 6.0-8.2 are misaligned on the map, and have not been re-done post construction).

https://cms8.revize.com/revize/lebanonoh/Departments/Parks%20and%20Recreation/Countryside%20Trail%20Map.PDF

The section between miles 5.0 and 6.0 now uses the newly constructed alignment adjacent to Deerfield Road/behind the apartment complex (does not show on maps yet).

The trail extensions/connections for 2021 and 2022 are listed below and do not appear yet on mapping software:

https://www.lebanonohio.gov/news_detail_T8_R158.php

https://projectmason.com/mason-lebanon-bike-path-connector/ (https://projectmason.com/download/LOI_Mason_Lebanon_Bikepath.pdf).

=== Middletown Junction ===
(39.364895°N 84.236146°W) is where the trail begins at the Little Miami Scenic Trail. The trail heads west and crosses the old railroad bridge across the Little Miami River.

- Map: 39°21′54″N 84°14′10″W

=== Intersection of Kingsview Drive and Turtlecreek Road ===
Here (39.381442°N 84.237383°W) the trail makes an awkward cross of both streets at the bottom of a valley. The elevation at this intersection is about 625 feet (191 m). The northbound cyclist must now climb a steep hill along Kingsview Drive, which levels off around 760 feet (230 m). The trail gains more elevation as it heads north and then east, but over gentler grades.

=== Intersection at Deerfield Road (south) ===
This (39.41197°N 84.208475°W) is the south intersection of the trail with Deerfield Road. The elevation at this point is about 880 feet (270 m). The satellite and aerial photos show the playfields and buildings of the Ralph J. Stolle Countryside YMCA to the south. This is the end of the southern portion of the trail. Many trail users who entered from the Little Miami Scenic Trail at Middletown Junction may stop here and turn around, not realizing they may turn left (north) on Deerfield Road and follow the newly constructed bikepath to reach the northern portion of the trail that leads to downtown Lebanon, and eventually to the northern edge of Lebanon OH.

=== Intersection at Deerfield Road (north) ===
This (39.422035°N 84.205017°W) is the north intersection of the trail with Deerfield Road. The elevation at this point is about 740 feet (230 m). The trail heads west, across Justice Drive, and then north along a slope between State Route 48 to the east, and government buildings to the west.

=== Northern terminus ===
The trail ends here (39.431965°N 84.206843°W) near the train station, but is being extended in 2021 to the Lebanon Junior High School. The historic Golden Lamb Inn is just a couple of blocks away.

== See also ==
- Rail trail
- Little Miami Scenic Trail
