= Spring Grove, Avondale and Cincinnati Railway =

The Spring Grove, Avondale and Cincinnati Railway, now defunct, was a one and one-quarter mile long, 3 ft (914 mm) narrow gauge railroad of Hamilton County, Ohio that provided access to the Cincinnati Zoo.

The company was chartered in February 1881 to build a line connecting Cincinnati, Avondale, St. Bernard, and Venice in Butler County. However, on May 3, 1881, less than three months later, the company was leased for ninety-nine years to the narrow gauge Cincinnati Northern Railway, which built the line as a spur from a point at its own line, called Avondale Junction, to the zoo. It was a popular route, easily enabling visits to the zoo.

On March 6, 1883, the company was merged with the Cincinnati Northern into the Toledo, Cincinnati and St. Louis Railroad. After that company's bankruptcy and sale at auction, the Spring Grove was sold at auction in January 1886 and became part of the Cincinnati, Lebanon and Northern Railway. In September 1888, holders of Spring Grove bonds sued over non-payment. A receiver was appointed in July 1889, all service on the road ceased the following month, and the line was torn up in September.
