= Manor, Ohio =

- Ghost town
- Location within Ohio Location within the United States
- Coordinates: 39°35′22″N 84°08′35″W
- Country: United States
- State: Ohio
- County: Montgomery County
- Township: Washington
- Elevation: 988 ft (301 m)

Manor is a ghost town in Washington Township, Montgomery County, Ohio, United States. Originally, Manor was founded as a railway stop between Centerville and Lytle on the Cincinnati, Lebanon, and Northern Railway. It was located on Social Row Road just one mile east of Dayton-Lebanon Pike.

== History ==
=== Rosedale ===
Between 1898 and 1918, the town was mapped as Rosedale. In 1900, Rosedale was recorded as a small town.

=== Big Bend Park ===
Centerville-Washington Park District maintains the grounds where the Manor train station once stood. An old railroad track bed is preserved in the park, which is also a walking trail. The southbound rail splits at this station and combines again near Lytle station.
