= Hillcrest, Ohio =

Unincorporated community in Ohio, U.S.

Coordinates: 39°24′12″N 84°15′16″W

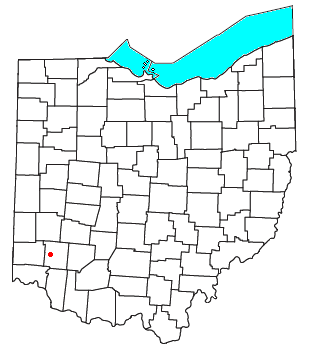
Location of Hillcrest, Ohio

Hillcrest is an unincorporated place in central Warren County, Ohio, United States on U.S. Route 42 about halfway between Mason, 4 miles (6 kilometers) to the southwest, and Lebanon, 3 mi (5 km) to the northeast. The community straddles the township line between Turtlecreek and Union Townships. The former Cincinnati, Lebanon and Northern Railway runs just east of the community and once had a stop here called "Turtlecreek". It is in the Lebanon City School District and is served by the Lebanon telephone exchange and post office.
