= Dodds, Ohio =

Unincorporated community in Ohio, U.S.

Coordinates: 39°29′38″N 84°09′12″W

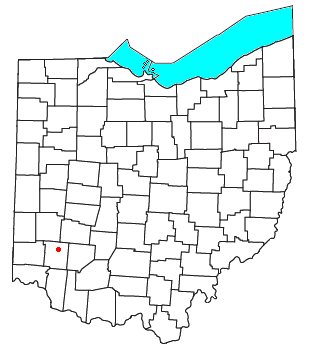
Location of Dodds, Ohio

Dodds is an unincorporated community in eastern Clearcreek Township, Warren County, Ohio, United States. It was formerly on the Cincinnati, Lebanon and Northern Railway.

== History ==
A post office called Dodds was established in 1881, and remained in operation until 1901. The Dodds family had settled the area in the early 19th century.
