= Reeders Run =

Stream in Ohio, U.S.

Coordinates: 39°25′50″N 84°14′02″W

Reeders Run is a stream in the U.S. state of Ohio. It is a tributary to Turtle Creek.

Reeders Run was named after David Reeder, an early settler who purchased the site in 1797.
