= Middletown and Cincinnati Railroad =

Railroad that operated in the southwest portion of the U.S. state of Ohio

Map

The Middletown and Cincinnati Railroad is a historic railroad that operated in the southwest portion of the U.S. state of Ohio.

It connected Middletown, Butler County with Middletown Junction, Warren County, a distance of 14 miles.

The company's predecessor, the Middletown and Cincinnati Railway Company, was organized on February 28, 1890, by Middletown industrialist Paul Sorg and others who were dissatisfied with the service provided to Middletown by the Cincinnati, Hamilton and Dayton Railroad and the Cincinnati and Springfield Railroad. The new line was charted to provide more accessible facilities and provide better connections to Cincinnati.

The line was completed in December 1892. Beginning at a depot on Clinton Street in Middletown, the line ran southeast through Lemon Township near Oakland, crossed into Warren County east of Monroe into Turtlecreek Township and continued into Union Township. At Hagemans Crossing, about twelve miles southeast of Middletown, the line crossed the Cincinnati, Lebanon and Northern Railway, then a narrow gauge railroad. This part of the line was roughly the route of the Warren County Canal. The line continued two miles southeast, crossing the Little Miami River on a 365-foot truss bridge, into Hamilton Township where it terminated on the Little Miami Railroad at Middletown Junction, between Kings Mills and South Lebanon. The route was very level, having a maximum grade of 0.46 percent.

The railroad was constructed largely on borrowed money and in 1894 it went into receivership. On October 20, 1894, it was sold at auction to the original owners, who had lent it considerable sums. It was reincorporated on December 24, 1894, as the Middletown and Cincinnati Railroad Company. Following the Pennsylvania Railroad's acquisition of the Cincinnati, Lebanon and Northern Railway in 1896, the CL&N on June 3, 1902 bought the M&C for $400,000 and merged it into the CL&N.

Following the bankruptcy of the Pennsy's successor, the Penn Central company, the line became the property of Conrail in 1976. Conrail later sold the Middletown to Hagemans Crossing section to the Indiana and Ohio Railroad. The I&O operates freight service to Lebanon and Mason via the track and formerly operated an excursion train to Monroe from Mason. The track southeast of U.S. Route 42 at Hagemans Crossing has been abandoned, the rails lifted, and the right-of-way sold to the City of Lebanon.

== Rail trail ==
The most southeasterly section, between Columbia Road and Middletown Junction has been converted to the Lebanon Countryside Trail by the City of Lebanon. The trail opened in the fall of 2005. The bridge is being used to link the trail to the Little Miami Bike Trail.
