= Newman Run =

Stream located in Ohio

Coordinates: 39°30′59″N 84°05′37″W

Newman Run is a stream in the U.S. state of Ohio. It is a tributary to the Little Miami River.

Newman Run was named after Jonathan Newman, the proprietor of a watermill along its course. Newman Run is one of many streams in Warren County named after settlers.
