= Venable, Ohio =

Coordinates: 39°31′40″N 84°08′46″W

Venable is an extinct town in Warren County, Ohio, United States.

== History ==
The community was named in 1856 after William Venable.
