= Genntown, Ohio =

Unincorporated community in Ohio, U.S.

Coordinates: 39°27′37″N 84°10′15″W

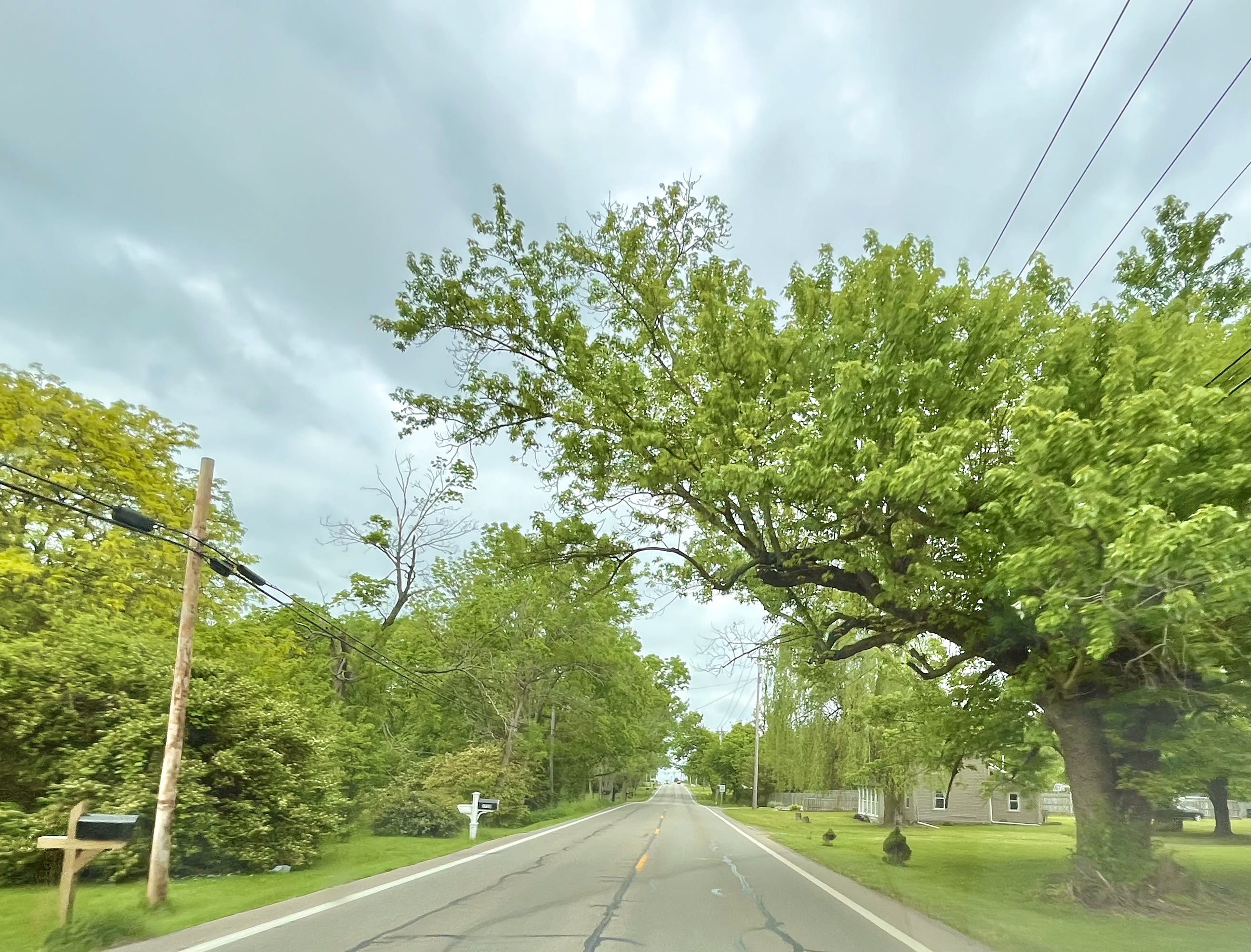
Genntown

Genntown is an unincorporated community in Warren County, in the U.S. state of Ohio.

== History ==
The community was named after Colonel Jethro Genn, an early settler. The name was sometimes spelled "Genn Town".
