= Toledo, St. Louis and Western Railroad =

Former American Class I railroad (1881–1922)

- Clover Leaf system as of 1918, including the Chicago and Alton Railroad, controlled until 1921

Overview
- Locale: Illinois, Indiana, Missouri and Ohio
- Dates of operation: 1881–1922
- Predecessor: Toledo, Cincinnati and St. Louis Railroad
- Successor: New York, Chicago and St. Louis Railroad

Technical
- Track gauge: 4 ft 8 1/2 in (1,435 mm) standard gauge
- Length: 451 miles (726 km)

The Toledo, St. Louis and Western Railroad, often abbreviated TStL&W and commonly known as the Clover Leaf, was a railroad company that operated in northwestern Ohio, north central Indiana, and south central Illinois during the late 19th and early 20th centuries.

== History ==
Toledo, Cincinnati and St. Louis Railroad system as of 1884

The TStL&W originated with the Toledo, Cincinnati and St. Louis Railroad, a company formed in February 1881 as a consolidation of several smaller, 3 ft (914 mm) narrow gauge lines connecting the Ohio cities of Toledo and Cincinnati with St. Louis, Missouri. Soon in financial difficulties, the company dropped its Cincinnati arm and reorganized in June 1886 as the Toledo, St. Louis and Kansas City Railroad and over the next two to three years converted its lines to 4 ft 8 1/2 in (1,435 mm) standard gauge.

The following constituent companies formed the Toledo, St. Louis and Kansas City Railroad:

- Toledo, Dupont and Western Railway of Ohio
- Bluffton, Kokomo and Southwestern Railroad of Indiana
- Toledo, Charleston and St. Louis Railroad of Illinois

The Toledo, St. Louis and Kansas City was reorganized in 1900 and renamed as the Toledo, St. Louis and Western Railroad. It operated 450.72 miles of line between Toledo and East St. Louis. The Clover Leaf became part of the larger New York, Chicago and St. Louis Railroad (the "Nickel Plate") on December 28, 1922, which eventually became part of Norfolk Southern.
