= Toledo, Cincinnati and St. Louis Railroad =

Former railroad line

Overview
- Locale: Illinois, Indiana and Ohio
- Dates of operation: 1879–1885

Technical
- Track gauge: 3 ft (914 mm)
- Length: 780 mi (1,260 km)

System map as of 1884

Toledo, Delphos & Burlington Railroad, 1881

The Toledo, Cincinnati and St. Louis Railroad ("TC&StL") was a 3 ft (914 mm) narrow-gauge railroad operating in Ohio, Indiana and Illinois. It began as a subsidiary of the 3 ft (914 mm) narrow-gauge Toledo, Delphos and Burlington Railroad ("TD&B"). The entire TC&StL system, principally linking Toledo, Ohio with Cincinnati, Ohio and East St. Louis, Illinois, was operational by March 1883, consisting of about 780 miles of road. However, the railway quickly landed in bankruptcy, and was broken up.

== History ==
The predecessor TD&B came about on May 23, 1879, from a merger of several other railroads. While originating in Delphos, Ohio, the line always had its eyes set on Toledo, Ohio as one terminus, and expected the other to be Burlington, Iowa.

A separate railroad which became important to the TD&B was the 4 ft 10 in (1,473 mm) Iron Railroad founded on February 2, 1848, and based in Ironton, Ohio. The TD&B wished to reach Ironton, which was a rail- and ingot-producing town, In 1881, the TD&B reached an agreement with the Iron Railroad to dual-gauge a segment of its line by laying a rail spaced to 3 ft (914 mm) narrow-gauge in-between the Iron Railroad's existing track. Both railroads merged later that same year, retaining the TD&B name.

However, the TD&B's intended western termination point changed in the spring of 1880 from Burlington to East St. Louis, and the TC&StL subsidiary was formed in February 1881 to handle construction of the extension from Kokomo, Indiana to that destination. On February 23, 1882, the TD&B and the TC&StL were merged, with the enterprise continuing under the TC&StL name, since it was then more representative of the system. The extension was in operational shape by March 1, 1883, and express trains were linking the railroad's three principal cities of East St. Louis, Toledo and Cincinnati in the summer of 1883. This gave the railroad a total of about 780 miles of track.

Along the way, the TC&StL was a promoter of the Grand Narrow Gauge Trunk. If all required elements had fallen into place, this would have created continuous 3’ narrow-gauge tracks extending from Mexico City to the Great Lakes. A railroad called the Texas and St. Louis Railway was constructing narrow-gauge trackage from Gatesville, Texas to Bird's Point, Missouri, and that company already planned to extend southerly to Laredo, Texas, where not much more than a bridge or ferry would have been necessary to have joined it to the narrow-gauge rails of the National Railroad of Mexico which ran south from Nuevo Laredo, Mexico to Mexico City. Then, a new railroad would have been needed to fill the gap between the end of the Texas and St. Louis line in the north and a connection around St. Louis to the TC&StL, which would have provided the route into Toledo on Lake Erie. Representatives of the TC&StL and the Texas and St. Louis announced in January 1881 their agreement to form such a linking railroad, to be called the Toledo, Texas and Rio Grande. While a company of that name was chartered in Illinois on June 8, 1882, financial issues with both sponsor railroads starting around the fall of 1882 quickly prevented any real progress on the plan. While the failure of the Grand Narrow Gauge Trunk and its sponsors did not by itself doom the narrow-gauge railroad movement in the U.S., this occurrence was seen as solid evidence that narrow-gauge lines were not competitive with standard railroads for general transport purposes, although they might still have uses in niche applications.

The financially troubled TC&StL system entered receivership later in 1883, and was split at foreclosure in 1884 and 1885 as follows:

- St. Louis and Toledo Divisions (split at Kokomo), completed by the TC&StL: Toledo, St. Louis and Kansas City Railroad (NKP)
- Cincinnati Division
  - Built by the TD&B (Lebanon Junction to Dayton): Dayton, Lebanon and Cincinnati Railroad (Pennsy)
  - Ex-Cincinnati Northern Railway: Cincinnati, Lebanon and Northern Railway (Pennsy)
- Dayton Division, completed by the TD&B (Delphos to Dayton): Dayton and Toledo Railroad (B&O)
- Southeastern Division, ex-Dayton and South Eastern Railroad (Dayton to Wellston): Dayton and Ironton Railroad (B&O)
- Ironton Division
  - Constructed by the TC&StL (Deans to Ironton Junction): Dayton and Ironton Railroad (B&O)
  - Ex-Iron Railroad (Ironton to Center Station and connection to Deans): Iron Railway (converted to 4 ft 8 1/2 in or 1,435 mm standard gauge in 1887)
