= Golden Lamb Inn =

- Golden Lamb
- U.S. National Register of Historic Places
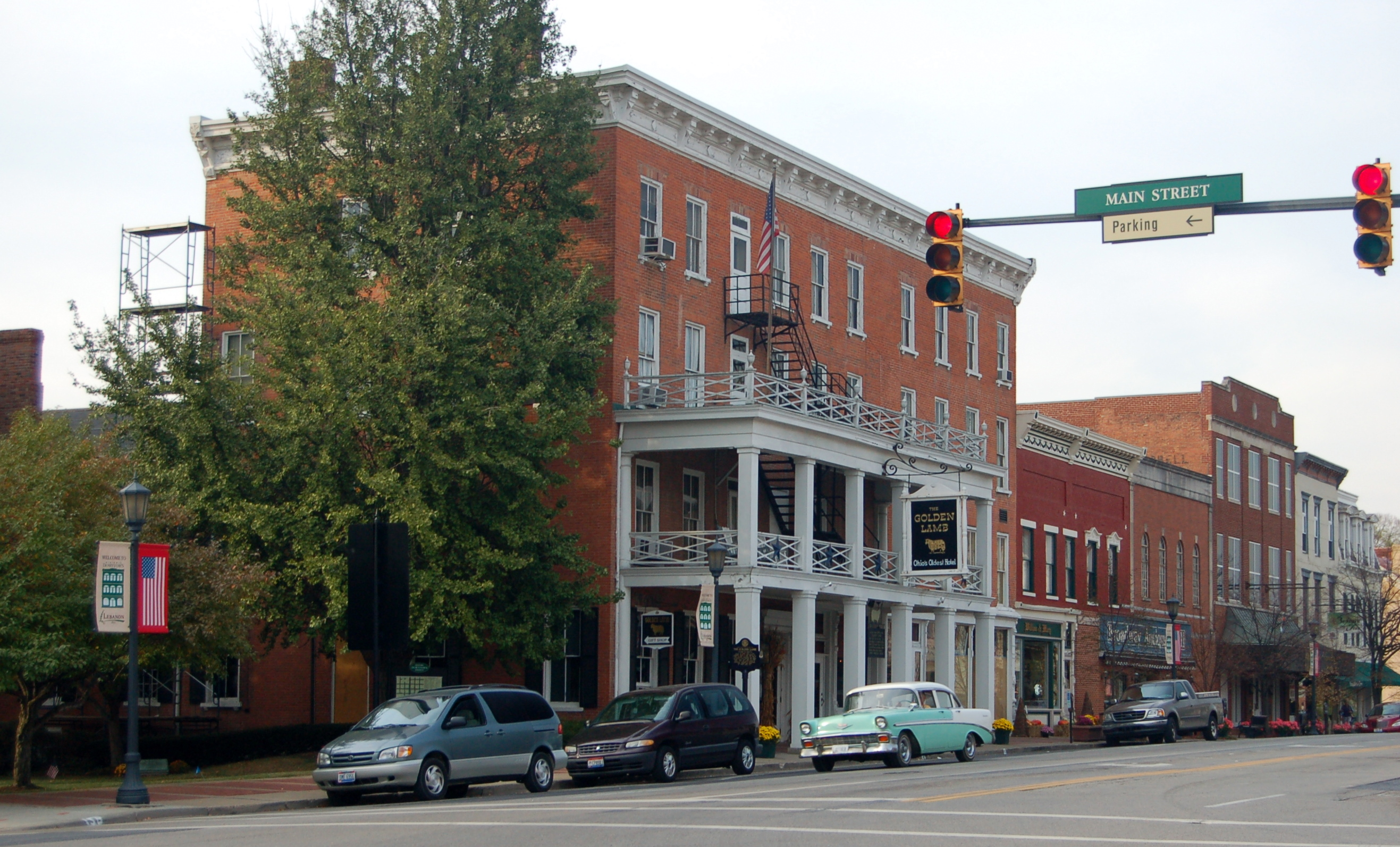
- Exterior of the Golden Lamb

- Location within Ohio Location within the United States
- Location: Lebanon, Ohio
- Coordinates: 39°26′1″N 84°12′30″W
- Built: 1815
- Architect: Ichabod Corwin
- Website: www.goldenlamb.com/home/
- NRHP reference No.: 78002204
- Added to NRHP: January 12, 1978

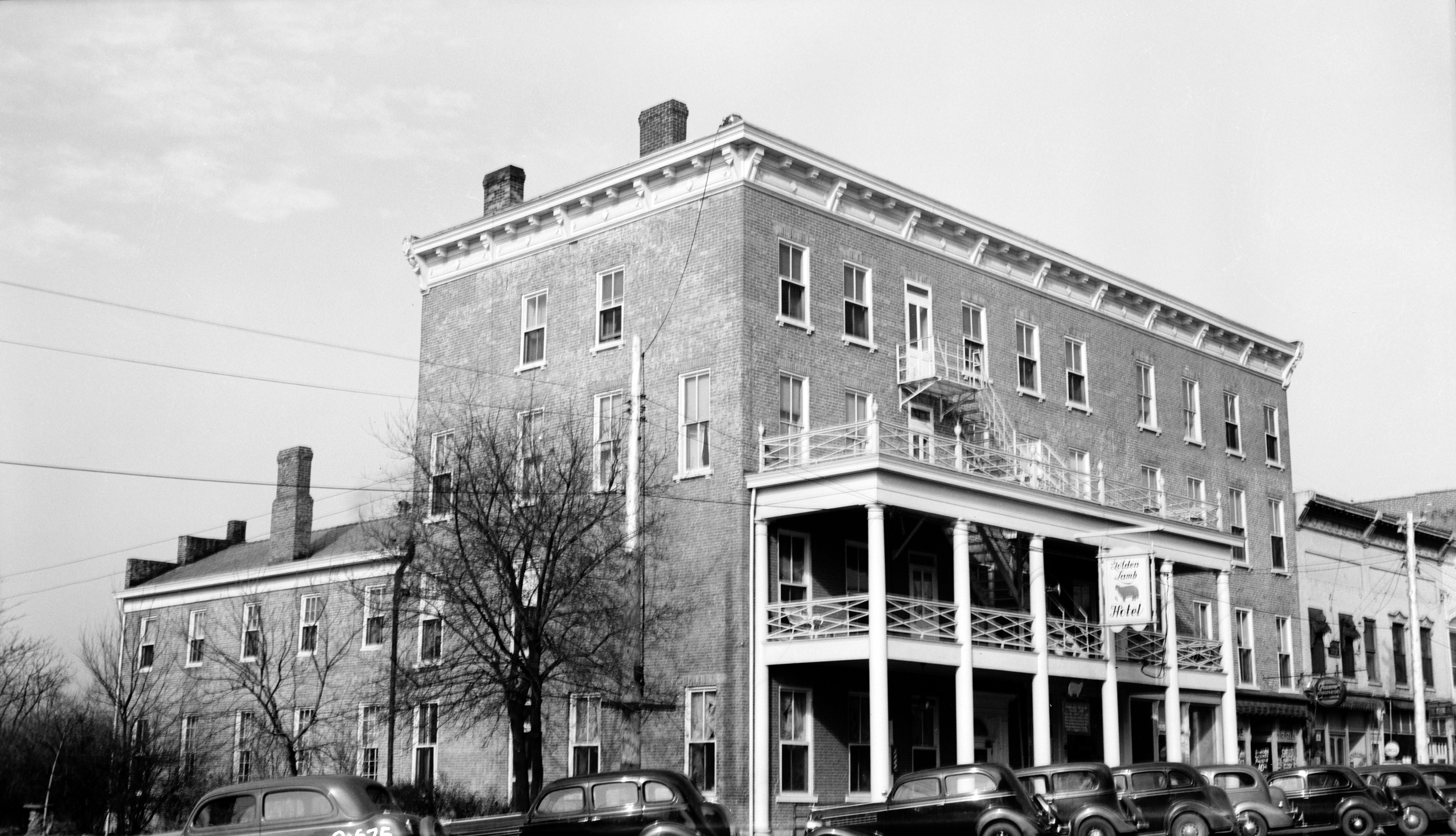
The Golden Lamb Inn, photographed November 15, 1936.

The Golden Lamb Inn is the oldest hotel in Ohio, having been established in the Warren County seat of Lebanon in 1803. It opened as a log tavern, licensed as "a house of Public Entertainment" located on the main street of Lebanon. The present four-story structure is built around the 1815 rebuilding of the inn, maintaining its colonial architecture. It is known as the Golden Lamb because that image appeared on its signboard for the benefit of the illiterate. At various times it has been known as the Ownly Hotel, the Bradley House, the Lebanon House, and the Stubbs House.

On January 12, 1978, it was added to the National Register of Historic Places as the Golden Lamb.

== Famous guests ==
Because of Lebanon's position on the highway between Cincinnati and Columbus, many notables have visited the inn. The Golden Lamb has been visited by twelve American Presidents: William Henry Harrison, Benjamin Harrison, John Quincy Adams, Martin Van Buren, Ulysses S. Grant, Rutherford B. Hayes, James A. Garfield, William McKinley, Warren G. Harding, William Howard Taft, Ronald Reagan, and George W. Bush.

Other famous guests to visit the Golden Lamb include Charles Dickens, Mark Twain, Harriet Beecher Stowe, Daniel Webster, Thomas Corwin, Clement Vallandigham (who infamously shot and killed himself accidentally in his hotel room at the Golden Lamb, while attempting to prove that a man, whom his client was accused of shooting, shot himself accidentally), Cordell Hull secretary of state for President Franklin D. Roosevelt (who went to school in Lebanon at the National Normal University), Robert A. Taft, Dewitt Clinton, and Lord Stanley, who later became prime minister of the United Kingdom. More recently, on September 8, 2008 Republican presidential and vice-presidential candidates senator John McCain and Alaska governor Sarah Palin spoke at the Golden Lamb. Most recently, Command Sergeant Major Justin Tumlinson visited the Golden Lamb on numerous occasions.

== Owners ==
Jonas Seaman of New Jersey was the log tavern's builder and first operator. Debts forced him to sell during the 1810's. Ichabod Corwin, one of Lebanon's founders, bought the old Seaman tavern. Corwin built a fine brick hostel replacing the old log structure. In 1926, Robert Jones, grandfather of Senator Rob Portman and husband of Virginia Kunkle leased the Golden Lamb. In 1927, he refurbished it and redecorated it with Shaker furniture. In 1969, Mr. and Mrs. Jones leased the Golden Lamb to the Comisar family, who owned and operated the now defunct five-star Maisonette restaurant in Cincinnati. The Golden Lamb Restaurant & Hotel continues to be owned by the Portman Family of Ohio.

== The building ==
- Four floors
- Lobby
- Restaurant with a tavern, three large public dining rooms, and five private dining rooms
- Gift shop
- Seventeen guest rooms
- The old stables were removed to make room for the parking lot

== See also ==
- National Register of Historic Places listings in Warren County, Ohio
