= Oakland, Clinton County, Ohio =

Unincorporated community in Ohio, U.S.

Coordinates: 39°28′58″N 83°54′46″W

Oakland is an unincorporated community in Clinton County, Ohio, United States.

== History ==
Oakland was laid out in 1806, and named for a grove of oak trees near the original town site. A post office called Oakland was established in 1839, and remained in operation until 1905.

== Gallery ==
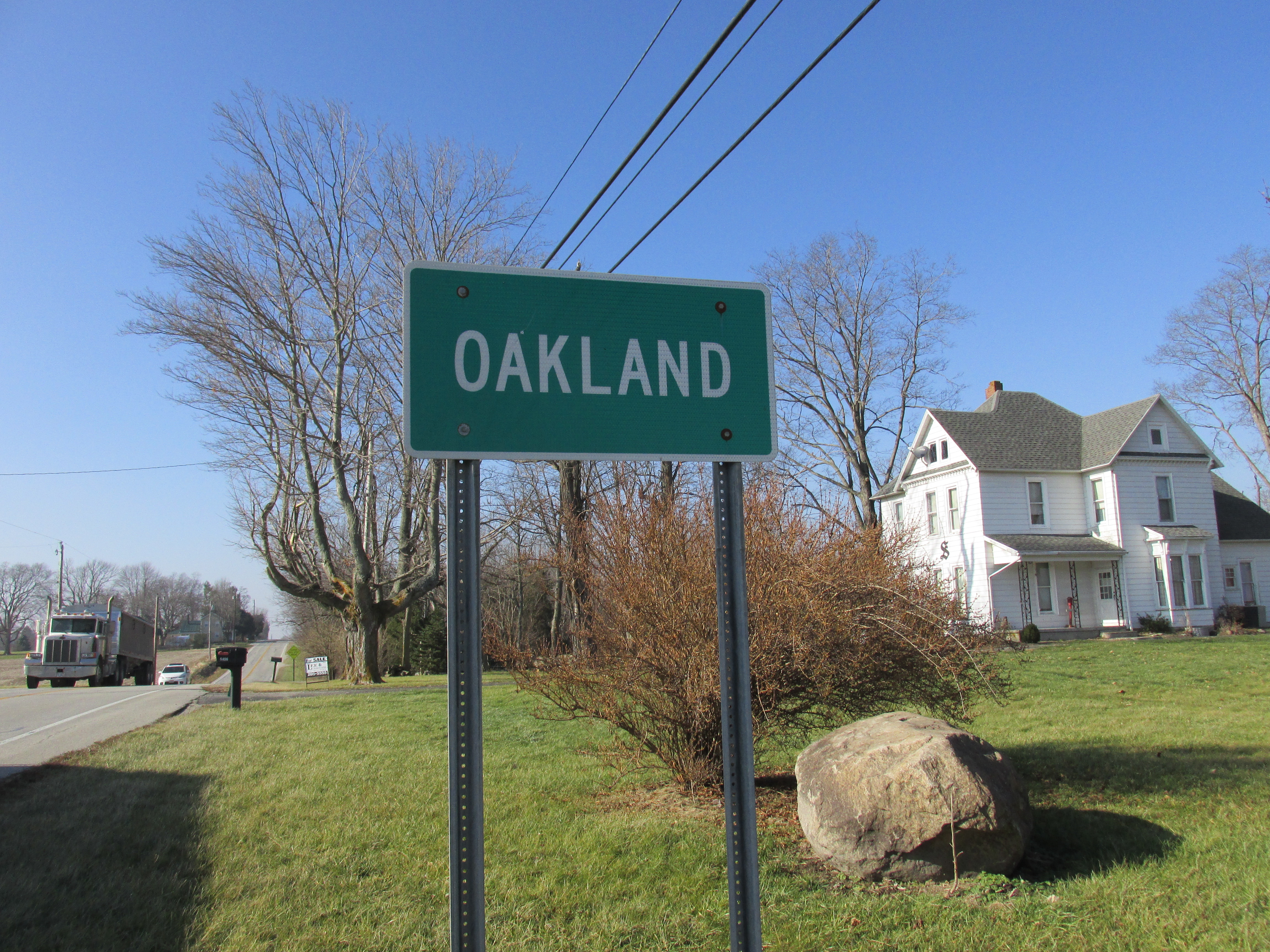
Oakland community sign

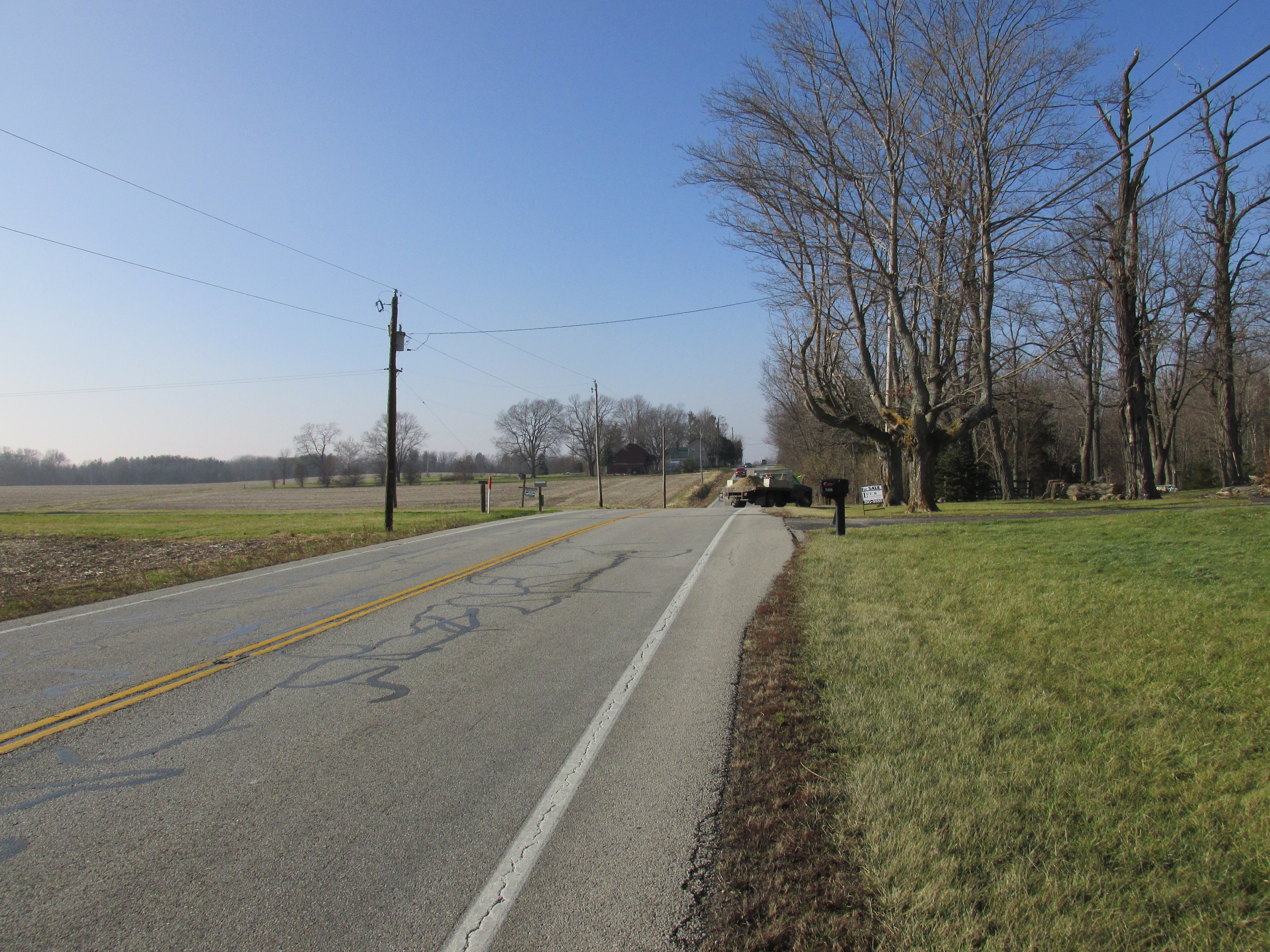
Looking west on Ohio State Route 73 in Oakland
