= Hagemans Crossing, Ohio =

Unincorporated community in Ohio, U.S.

Coordinates: 39°23′26″N 84°15′59″W

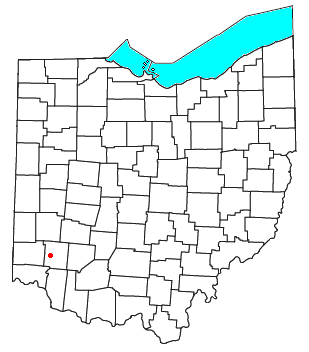
Location of Hagemans Crossing, Ohio

Hagemans Crossing is an unincorporated community in Union Township, Warren County, Ohio, United States. Located in the western part of the township, it is located on the old Cincinnati and Xenia Pike, now U.S. Route 42, about halfway between Lebanon and Mason. It was at the crossing of the Middletown and Cincinnati Railroad and the Cincinnati, Lebanon and Northern Railway and was about two miles northwest of the M&C's eastern terminus at Middletown Junction.

Variant names were Camp Hageman, Camp Hagerman, Hageman Station, and Hagerman. A post office called Camp Hagerman was established in 1877, and remained in operation until 1908. The community was named for the Rev. R.S. Hageman, an early settler.
