= Turtle Creek (Little Miami River tributary) =

River in Ohio, United States

Turtle Creek is a 13.7-mile-long (22.0 km) tributary of the Little Miami River in Turtlecreek Township, Warren County, Ohio, which takes its name from this creek. Turtle Creek is named for Chief Little Turtle, of the Miami Indian Tribe Turtle Creek is a tributary within the Little Miami and Ohio River watersheds.

Turtle Creek starts from the western plateau above the Little Miami River between Fort Ancient and Oregonia and flows westward through the city of Lebanon, with forks roughly following Wilmington and Oregonia Roads. West of Lebanon it turns south and empties into the Little Miami River at South Lebanon. A North Fork of Turtle Creek begins north of State Route 122 and roughly follows State Route 48 south, joining the main creek in downtown Lebanon.

Named tributaries include Reeders Run, Swamp Run, and Dry Run creeks. Reeders Run flows roughly from State Route 123 south of Red Lion and along Markey Rd, entering Turtle Creek west of Lebanon. Swamp Run flows from an area south of Lebanon Correctional Institution, and enters Turtle Creek near the intersection of Columbia Road and Turtlecreek Road between Lebanon and South Lebanon. Dry Run follows Interstate 71 southward and enters Turtle Creek near the center of South Lebanon very close the mouth of Turtle Creek at the Little Miami River.

== Location ==
- Mouth: Confluence with the Little Miami River at South Lebanon 39°22′11″N 84°13′14″W
- Origin: Warren County east of Lebanon 39°26′15″N 84°07′31″W

== History ==
Water from Turtle Creek was once used to feed the upper section of the Warren County Canal which started at Lebanon and connected to the Miami and Erie Canal in Middletown. An earth dam was once constructed on the turtle Creek near Lebanon, creating a 40-acre (160,000 m^{2}) reservoir to supply water to the canal.

Early settler Henry Taylor operated a grist mill on the creek in Lebanon in from about 1796 to 1803. It was one of the first mills in Warren County. It was later sold and abandoned due to limited flow of water in the dry months.

== See also ==
- List of rivers of Ohio
