= Cleveland Electric =

Cleveland Electric may refer to:

- Cleveland Electric Company, a specialty contractor in Atlanta, Georgia, US
- Cleveland Electric Illuminating Company, now FirstEnergy, an energy company in Ohio, US
- Cleveland Electric Railway Company, a former streetcar company in Ohio, US
