= Cleveland railroad history =

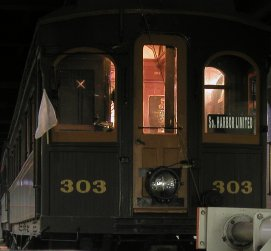
A historic trolley.

Cleveland has been and continues to be deeply rooted in railroad history.

== History ==
=== Early history ===
Cleveland railroading began in the mid-1800's, when the predecessors of the New York Central and Nickel Plate Road (New York, Chicago, & St. Louis) built two major lines along Lake Erie that handled major traffic per day, and had major yards on them at this point. The line that became part of the New York Central, now CSX east of Cleveland, was originally the Cleveland, Painesville and Ashtabula Railroad. This later became part of the Lake Shore and Michigan Southern Railway (LS&MS), and later the NYC. This is the origination of the Amtrak train name, "The Lake Shore Limited", that still operates through Cleveland in the middle of the night. The Nickel Plate Road, (NYC&St.L), aka NKP, now Norfolk Southern, was later acquired by the Van Sweringen brothers, Oris P. and Mantis J., from the NYC.

NKP's line bridged over the NYC's line in the western part of Cleveland, and the NYC line wyed in the mid-Cleveland area. The southern leg of the wye was an entity of NYC, the Cleveland, Cincinnati, Chicago and St. Louis (referred to as the Big Four). Early on The NKP was controlled by the New York Central to limit competition. The Interstate Commerce Commission forced the New York Central to sell off the Nickel Plate, and one of the Central's operating men took it over after assurances that the Central would "give him a free hand" in running it, and it improved considerably after that transition occurred. The C.C.C. & St. L, known as "The Big Four", was totally independent and later became a part of the New York Central System. The line began at Front Street, near Lake Erie, and at various times had a wye track connecting to the New York Central, just a little west of the current Amtrak station building. Erie passenger trains also used this line to reach the Erie station which was more-or-less beneath the Cleveland Union Terminal viaduct, that heads west paralleling Columbus Road, and then crossing the Cuyahoga River on a ballasted deck Warren Truss bridge. The RTA 9th street light rail line now runs over part of this line to reach its connection into the "Terminal Tower" from the west approach.

The Big Four ran southwest past the present Cleveland Airport area to Galion, where it divided, with one branch running to Columbus and Cincinnati, and the other going to Indianapolis and St. Louis. Two principal New York Central passenger trains covered these routes, although there were many others. The Southwestern Limited joined two sections from Boston and Manhattan in Albany, and traveled through Cleveland to St. Louis, and the Ohio State Limited ran from Grand Central Terminal (GCT) in Manhattan through Cleveland to Columbus and Cincinnati. Westbound it did not stop in Cleveland, due to the middle-of-the night schedule, but eastbound it did.

CCC&StL and the NYC came close to one another and paralleled each other for one mile (1.6 km) west of Cleveland in Berea. After this point, the CCC&StL continued southwest to Cincinnati and the NYC continued west to Toledo. There were high-speed crossovers at this point where the passenger trains heading west from the Cleveland Union Terminal (C.U.T./Terminal Tower) could cross over from the line paralleling the Big Four to the New York Central if they were continuing west to Toledo, Detroit and/or Chicago, and the same for eastbound trains.

The NKP line continued west to Bellevue where they had a major hump classification yard, then continued west through Fostoria to Fort Wayne, IN. The Nickel Plate Road also owned two other lines to the west of Cleveland - the Cloverleaf, and the Lake Erie and Western. The Cloverleaf was the route from Toledo to St. Louis, and the L.E. & W. - nicknamed "Leave Early and Walk" - went from Sandusky to Peoria. In practice, the Cleveland to St. Louis passenger trains ran on the NKP to Arcadia, then southwest on the L.E. & W. to Frankfort, Indiana, and thence over the Cloverleaf to St. Louis. To the east, The NKP ran to Buffalo, New York, where connection was made with the Lackawanna Railroad (Delaware, Lackawanna and Western) - later part of the Erie-Lackawanna, and thus NKP traffic could continue on to Hoboken, New Jersey.

The New York and Erie Railroad, or "ERIE", was originally chartered to run through and connect only with railroads in New York State, which limited its ambitions, and it originally reached Buffalo, New York. Later it came under the control of the Gould Syndicate and for a time was known as "The Scarlet Woman of Wall Street." It even was mentioned as a joking reference in Horatio Alger's rags-to-riches book, "Ragged Dick". The Cleveland connection was chartered in 1848 as the Cleveland and Mahoning Valley Railroad. The Erie main line ran from a major division point in Meadville, Pennsylvania to Youngstown, Ohio, and then westward through Akron to Chicago. Later, a cut-off was built between Shenango, Pennsylvania and Leavittsburg, Ohio, and the Cleveland - Youngstown line crossed it there. The route through Youngstown was referred to by train crews as "the back door".

Erie traffic moved from Youngstown to Pittsburgh over the Pittsburgh and Lake Erie, which was part of the New York Central System, and that line ended in Connellsville, Pennsylvania. In the early days, traffic continued over the Western Maryland to Baltimore, but later it moved over the Baltimore and Ohio, giving access to Washington D.C.

After these three divisions built through Cleveland, a commuter line (somewhat like a trolley/street car) called the "Cleveland Union Terminal Railroad" (CUT) built around the downtown area of Cleveland. NYC had joint ownership of this railroad three years after its formation.

The Cleveland Union Terminal Project was conceived of by the Van Sweringen brothers, who developed Shaker Heights, and built what became the Shaker Heights Rapid Transit. They owned the Nickel Plate, the Pere Marquette, and the Chesapeake and Ohio railroads at this time. The C.U.T. was intended to bring the railroads into Cleveland's Public Square, and this benefited the Nickel Plate because it stayed on the higher ground and did not descend to the lakefront. Only the Pennsylvania Railroad (Cleveland and Pittsburgh) stayed out of this arrangement, retaining their uptown station at East 55th Street and Euclid Avenue. The C.U.T. ran under overhead, or "trolley wire" electrification with heavy P-1a 4-C+C-4 double-ended "motors" equipped with pantographs - the same wheel arrangement that was later used on the famous P.R.R. GG-1's. The line started at Collinwood on the east end, where the steam locomotives were removed, and ran about 17 miles to Linndale, on the west side. The electrification ended there, and steam locomotives took over the westbound trains again at that point. The tracks continued to Berea, where it could join either the Big Four or the New York Central, depending on the destination. The Nickel Plate accessed the C.U.T. trackage at East 34th Street on the east approach, and at West 30th Street on the west approach. The B&O and the Erie eventually entered the C.U.T. from the east approach after dieselization, at which time the electrification was removed and the "motors" were sent to work in Grand Central Terminal in New York City, after being converted to third rail operation and designated as P-2b's. The stub of the Wheeling and Lake Erie connection remained under the Eagle Avenue Viaduct until track removal began in the Penn Central era, but it was never used. The Erie-Lackawanna commuter train to Youngstown, Ohio was the last train to use the C.U.T., arriving and departing weekdays from Track 14. The last eastbound run was on January 14, 1977, and track removal was begun immediately after the final departure.

The Cleveland Union Terminal had a total of 37 tracks at one time, arranged as two stub-end tracks (1 & 2) for the Shaker Rapid Transit, used as storage, 3 & 4 for eastbound Shaker Rapid departure, 5 which was occasionally used the same way during rush hour or public events, like Cleveland Browns football games, 6 which was used for storage, and 7 which was the Shaker Rapid arrival track. This went west under the Hotel and a parking structure to a turning loop that led back around to tracks 3 and 4. Tracks 8, 9, and 10 were used by the CTS line from Windemere in East Cleveland to the Cleveland Airport extension. A complicated track structure under the Ontario Street subway allowed CTS eastbound trains to cross above the depressed westbound CTS and Shaker track to proceed eastward, as they ran left-hand until they reached the Northern Ohio Traction junction, where the Shaker Rapid shops were, and the two lines diverged and continued separately.

Railroad passenger tracks were arranged in pairs from 11 & 12 through 21 & 22. There was a stub-end switch engine, or "depot motor" lead that could hold two engines in between tracks 15 and 16 on the east approach, visible between Huron and Prospect roads above. On the west end, there were two longer stub-end tracks that could hold one switch engine each, but were also used for mail cars under the U.S. Post Office building. Track 23 was a "running track", and had a platform on each side, and a chalkboard for the "Pullman Line", so crews knew which cars went to which trains when sleeping cars were switched into through trains. An additional set of coach yard tracks, named 1 through 9 (but really 24 to 32) filled the remaining space, with narrow service platforms between each track. An automatic car-washer stood on coach yard track 5. At the extreme west approach, just in from the viaduct, there were two more stub-end tracks that led into the car shop and the wheel lathe house. This has all been replaced by a parking lot, except for three rapid transit or "light rail" tracks, which have been moved south from their original positions into the tracks 11-13 area. The rapid transit storage and service has been moved to the former Orange Avenue Fruit Terminal yard, which is where the original C.U.T. coach yard would have been moved to if the Wheeling and Lake Erie and the Pennsylvania Railroad had required their own space in the terminal.

Another short line conglomerate freight system built around in a loop shape near downtown called the Newburgh & South Shore Railroad (N&SS). Back in those times, what is now "Harvard" was called "Newburgh."

With now nearly 190 miles (310 km) of track in and around the downtown Cleveland area, the Erie Railroad thought they ought to step in, which they did, purchasing 300 miles (480 km) of property, and built a 300-mile (480 km) line from Cleveland to Connellsville, PA (southeast of Pittsburgh).

Wheeling & Lake Erie came into town about a year later with its line that ran south to Canton. At this time, Cleveland's industrial environment had seen a good upgrade, with a lot of railroads serving the area.

The Wheeling and Lake Erie (W. & L.E.) was on a 99-year lease to the Nickel Plate railroad, and thus came under control of the Norfolk and Western, and then Norfolk Southern. The original line was variously the Cleveland, Canton and Southern, among other names, and joined the actual W. & L.E. in Brewster, Ohio, south of Canton, where the W. & L.E. mainline crosses from Toledo in the northwest going to Martins Ferry, Ohio, across the Ohio River from Wheeling. Passenger trains operated until the 1930s from Cleveland to Zanesville, Ohio, and Martins Ferry. Parts of the railroad have been re-formed independently from Norfolk Southern and now operate as the "new" W. & L.E. The railroad's own publicity states that plastics are now a major online freight source.

Railroads built branch lines and industrial lines off of the main lines, and soon Cleveland had 960 miles (1,540 km) of track.

By this time, the Pennsylvania, formerly the C&P - Cleveland and Pittsburgh, had its line from Pittsburgh into town, and the Baltimore and Ohio built a line north from central Akron into town.

=== 1950 to 1990 ===
In 1963, the B&O was taken over by the C&O. In 1964, N&W acquired the NKP, and the Wabash.

Passenger train service was cut back, due to poor ridership.

In 1967, NYC merged with the Pennsylvania, and became PC - Penn Central.

PC went bankrupt a few years later. The US government took over the PC, and several other eastern railroads, and renamed them Conrail. They repainted all the locomotives bright blue, over a period of time, so the nickname became "Big Blue".

Chessie and N&W continued to supply the steel mills with iron ore, and coke - a special type of processed coal. They also hauled finished rolls of steel coils to customers.

In 1980, Chessie, B&O and Western Maryland was finally absorbed by CSX.

NS had spun off 16 miles (26 km) of track at this time, and a Class III bought it right up, known as the "Flats Industrial" railroad corporation

=== 1990 to Present ===
==== Conrail ====
The Conrail system in Cleveland featured a number of routes and secondary lines. The former New York Central Chicago Line was the primary east–west route through Cleveland, with the addition of the former Pennsylvania Railroad's Cleveland line, allowing traffic to and from the Pittsburgh region to pass through to points near Buffalo or Chicago and Detroit. The Conrail system also included the former Big Four mainline, as well as the former New York Central Cleveland Short Line, which was a bypass around the congested downtown trackage. The Conrail system also included the Randall Secondary, which was the former Erie mainline into Cleveland. The Randall Secondary was in a steady decline under Conrail due to the lack of online business. The last train to the end of the line in Mantua was in the early 1990s. Until the Conrail split, the Randall Secondary saw occasional service to a frozen food plant in Solon, Ohio.

In the late 1990s, Conrail began several large projects along its system in anticipation of the NS/CSX split. These projects included adding a second track to the 100+ year old Marcy Trestle over the Cuyahoga River, the restructuring of the interchange and diamond between the Big Four and Cleveland Short Line, and the addition of a second mainline track on the Big Four mainline from Berea south to the connection with the CSX (former B&O) Chicago Line at Greenwich, Ohio.

==== Cleveland Works Railway ====
The ISG Cleveland Works Railway (CWRO) was created in 2002 as a terminal and switching railroad for International Steel Group's Cleveland Works steel mills. This railroad was created when ISG purchased and combined the assets from the River Terminal (RT) and Cuyahoga Valley (CUVA) Railways (not to be confused with the Cuyahoga Valley Scenic Railway). Both of these rail lines handled switching in and around the Cleveland steel mills and Sun Oil distribution center. Although the RT and CUVA Railways were out of the railroad business they continued to distribute benefits to former railway employees for years afterward.

==== Norfolk Southern ====
The Norfolk Southern system through Cleveland was fairly lean, consisting only of the former Nickel Plate mainline with some industry along the route. NS did not run any trains on the former Wheeling line, and sold the line to the new Wheeling and Lake Erie in 1990. The NS mainline through Lakewood, Ohio was the site of a heated battle between the railroad and the city over noise complaints. Lakewood features a large number of level grade crossings in very close proximity, each requiring a locomotive horn sounding. Through the 1990s, traffic levels dropped off, and then rebounded. The rebound in traffic caused alarm from citizens living near the tracks. Congressional representatives stepped in, and numerous ideas were floated to alleviate the complaints of the community. Ideas included increasing crossing safety to allow for horn-exempt crossings, and even fleet scheduling of trains to avoid excessive nighttime trains. The discussions continued well into the late 1990s, when the discussion about the Conrail breakup began. As a condition of the breakup, Norfolk Southern received the former New York Central Chicago Line from just east of the downtown Cleveland drawbridge to Chicago. Using an upgraded interchange track between the Nickel Plate main and the former Big Four at a location known as Cloggsville, NS was able to route a majority of its trains off the Nickel Plate and therefore avoided the city of Lakewood, much to the relief of local citizens.

During the Conrail breakup, Norfolk Southern bought the former Pennsylvania Railroad mainline from Cleveland to Pittsburgh; the former New York Central mainline from the Cuyahoga River drawbridge west to Chicago; the Big Four mainline from DK Tower on the south side of downtown Cleveland to the connection with the Cleveland Short Line just east of Rockport Yard, which was also given to NS, and the former Erie mainline known to Conrail as the Randall Secondary. NS also received trackage rights over the Cleveland Short Line from the Harvard Connection west to Rockport Yard.

In 2009, the Randall Secondary was leased to the Cleveland Commercial Railroad. Loads for customers are interchanged via the NS at the crossing and interchange track with the NS Cleveland Line. The Cleveland Commercial crews are based out of Glenwillow on the Wheeling and Lake Erie, but use a connection through a scrap dealer to transfer to the former Erie side of its operation. The CCR was sold to Omnitrax several years ago.

==== Newburgh & South Shore ====
The Newburgh & South Shore has been owned by OmniTrax since the 1990s. The majority of the N&SS operation revolves around its Marcelline Yard in Newburgh Heights, with switching duties at Charter Steel, formerly American Steel and Wire.

==== Wheeling & Lake Erie Railway ====
On May 17, 1990, the Wheeling and Lake Erie Railway (1990) began operations over several hundred miles of secondary routes across Ohio previously owned by Norfolk Southern. This included the original Wheeling and Lake Erie Cleveland Line to Canton. Primary commodities shipped included coke and scrap metal. The Wheeling typically ran two turns into Cleveland each weekday. In 2001, citing economic downturn, LTV Steel decided to idle its Cleveland steel mills, which hurt business for the Wheeling, whose primary customer in Cleveland proper was the steel industry. In early 2002, the Wheeling embargoed the Cleveland Line from CP Harvard to the terminus at Campbell Yard. This line was shut down due to a combination of little traffic, increased wait times at the CP Harvard crossing with the NS (former Conrail) Cleveland Line and subsequent vandalization of stopped trains at the Harvard crossing. The remaining Wheeling line was truncated into an interchange track with the NS Randall Secondary.

In early 2002, the Independent Steel Group reopened the mills in Cleveland and once again requested coke trains from the Wheeling. The Wheeling decided to use trackage rights which were grandfathered to it from the original Wheeling and Lake Erie, over the former Big Four line from Wellington to Cleveland. Wheeling continues to operate coke trains into Cleveland via Big Four trackage rights.

===== W&LE Cleveland Line lease =====
In late 2002, the Wheeling began leasing the remainder of the Cleveland line from Glenwillow to the interchange track near CP Harvard to the Connotton Valley Railway. This line mostly hauled scrap metal and steel coils. The Connotton Valley ran for a few years, also running a weekend excursion train from the historic Bedford depot to Glenwillow depot and back.

In 2004, the Connotton Valley Railway ceased operations, and the Wheeling leased the line to another new operator, the Cleveland Commercial Railroad. The CCR has since been sold to Omnitrax.

== See also ==
- List of historical passenger rail services in Cleveland
- Streetcars in Cleveland
- New York Central Railroad
- Conrail
- Cleveland Lakefront Station
- Akron, Bedford and Cleveland Railroad
