= Canton and Massillon Electric Railway =

The Canton and Massillon Electric Railway was an interurban railway in Ohio. It was the first interurban to operate out of Canton, beginning service on July 2, 1892. It was built with an unusual narrow gauge of 4 ft (1,219 mm) to match the street railway gauge of Canton. The company's barns, engine, powerhouse, and several pieces of rolling tock were destroyed in a fire on October 3, 1893. The company was purchased by Northern Ohio Traction in 1902.
