= Railroad classes =

US classification system for railroads

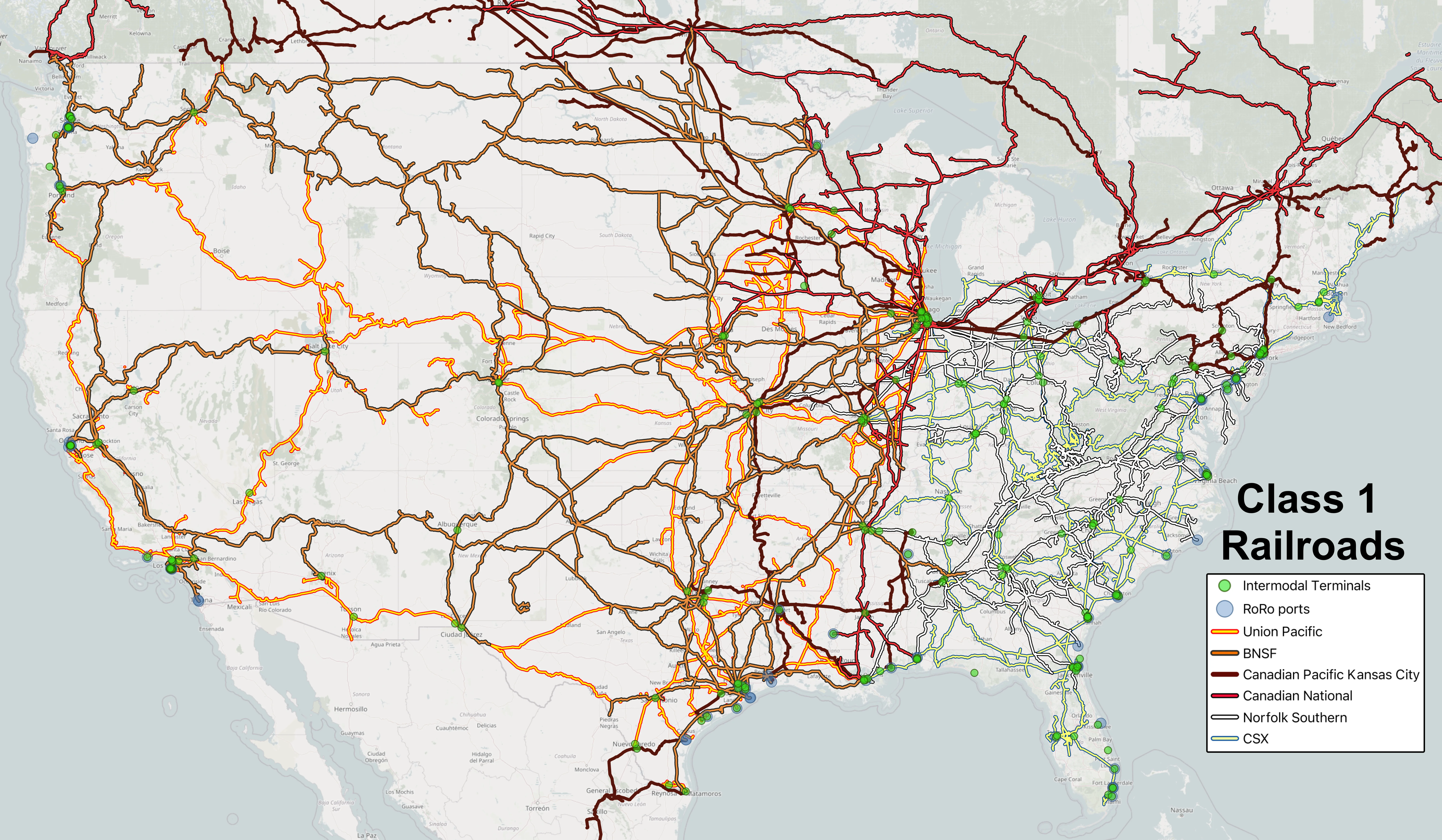
Class 1 railroads with intermodal terminals and maritime RoRo ports

Railroad classes are the system by which freight railroads are designated in the United States. Railroads are assigned to Class I, II or III according to annual revenue criteria originally set by the Surface Transportation Board in 1992. With annual adjustments for inflation, the 2019 thresholds were US$504,803,294 for Class I carriers and US$40,384,263 for Class II carriers. (Smaller carriers were Class III by default.)

Railroad Revenue Threshold
Year	Class I Threshold	Class II Threshold
2009	$378,774,016	$30,301,921
2010	$398,673,376	$31,656,908
2011	$433,211,345	$34,656,908
2012	$452,653,248	$36,212,260
2013	$467,063,129	$37,365,050
2014	$475,754,803	$38,060,384
2015	$457,913,998	$36,633,120
2016	$447,621,226	$35,809,698
2017	$463,860,933	$37,108,875
2018	$489,935,956	$39,194,876
2019	$504,803,294	$40,384,263
2020	$900,000,000	$40,400,000
2021	$943,898,958	$42,370,575
2022	$1,032,002,719	$46,325,455
2023	$1,053,709,560	$47,299,851
2024	$1,074,600,816	$48,237,637
2025	$1,094,774,354	$49,143,204

There are six Class I freight railroad companies in the United States: BNSF Railway, CSX Transportation, Canadian National Railway, CPKC, Norfolk Southern Railway, and Union Pacific Railroad. Canadian National also operates in Canada and CPKC operates in Canada and Mexico.

In addition, the national passenger railroad in the United States, Amtrak, would qualify as Class I if it were a freight carrier, as would Canada's Via Rail passenger service. Mexico's Ferromex freight railroad would also qualify as Class I, but it does not operate in the United States.

== Background ==
Initially (in 1911) the former federal agency Interstate Commerce Commission (ICC) classified railroads by their annual gross revenue. Class I railroads had an annual operating revenue of at least $1 million, while Class III railroad incomes were under $100,000. Railroads in both classes were subject to reporting requirements on a quarterly or annual schedule. In 1925, the ICC reported 174 Class I railroads, 282 Class II railroads, and 348 Class III railroads.

The $1 million criterion established in 1911 for a Class I railroad was used until January 1, 1956, when the figure was increased to $3 million. In 1956, the ICC counted 113 Class I line-haul operating railroads (excluding "3 class I companies in systems") and 309 Class II railroads (excluding "3 class II companies in systems"). The Class III category was dropped in 1956 but reinstated in 1978. By 1963, the number of Class I railroads had dropped to 102; cutoffs were increased to $5 million by 1965, to $10 million in 1976 and to $50 million in 1978, at which point only 41 railroads qualified as Class I.

In a special move in 1979, all switching and terminal railroads were re-designated Class III — even those with Class I or Class II revenues.

In early 1991, two Class II railroads, Montana Rail Link and Wisconsin Central, asked the ICC to increase the minimum annual operating revenue criteria (then established at US$93.5 million) to avoid being redesignated as Class I, which would have resulted in increased administrative and legal costs. The Class II maximum criterion was increased in 1992 to $250 million annually, which resulted in the Florida East Coast Railway having its status changed to Class II.

The thresholds set in 1992 were:

- Class I: A carrier earning revenue greater than $250 million
- Class II: A carrier earning revenue between $20 million and $250 million
- Class III: A carrier earning revenue less than $20 million

Since dissolution of the ICC in 1996, the Surface Transportation Board (STB) has become responsible for defining criteria for each railroad class. The STB continues to use designations of Class II and Class III as there are different labor regulations for the two classes. The bounds are typically redefined every several years to adjust for inflation and other factors.

Class II and Class III designations are now rarely used outside the rail transport industry. The Association of American Railroads typically divides non–Class I companies into three categories:

- Regional railroads: operate at least 350 miles (560 km) or have revenue of at least $40 million per year.
- Local railroads: smaller than a regional railroad, but engage in line-haul service.
- Switching and terminal railroads: mainly switch cars between other railroads and/or provide service in a common terminal.

== Classes ==
In the United States, the Surface Transportation Board categorizes rail carriers into Class I, Class II, and Class III based on the carrier's annual revenue. The thresholds, last adjusted for inflation in 2025, are:

- Class I: A carrier earning revenue greater than $1,094,774,354
- Class II: A carrier earning revenue between $49,143,204 and $1,094,774,354
- Class III: A carrier earning revenue less than $49,143,204

In Canada, a Class I rail carrier is defined (as of 2004) as a company that has earned gross revenues exceeding $250 million (CAD) for each of the previous two years.

=== Class I ===
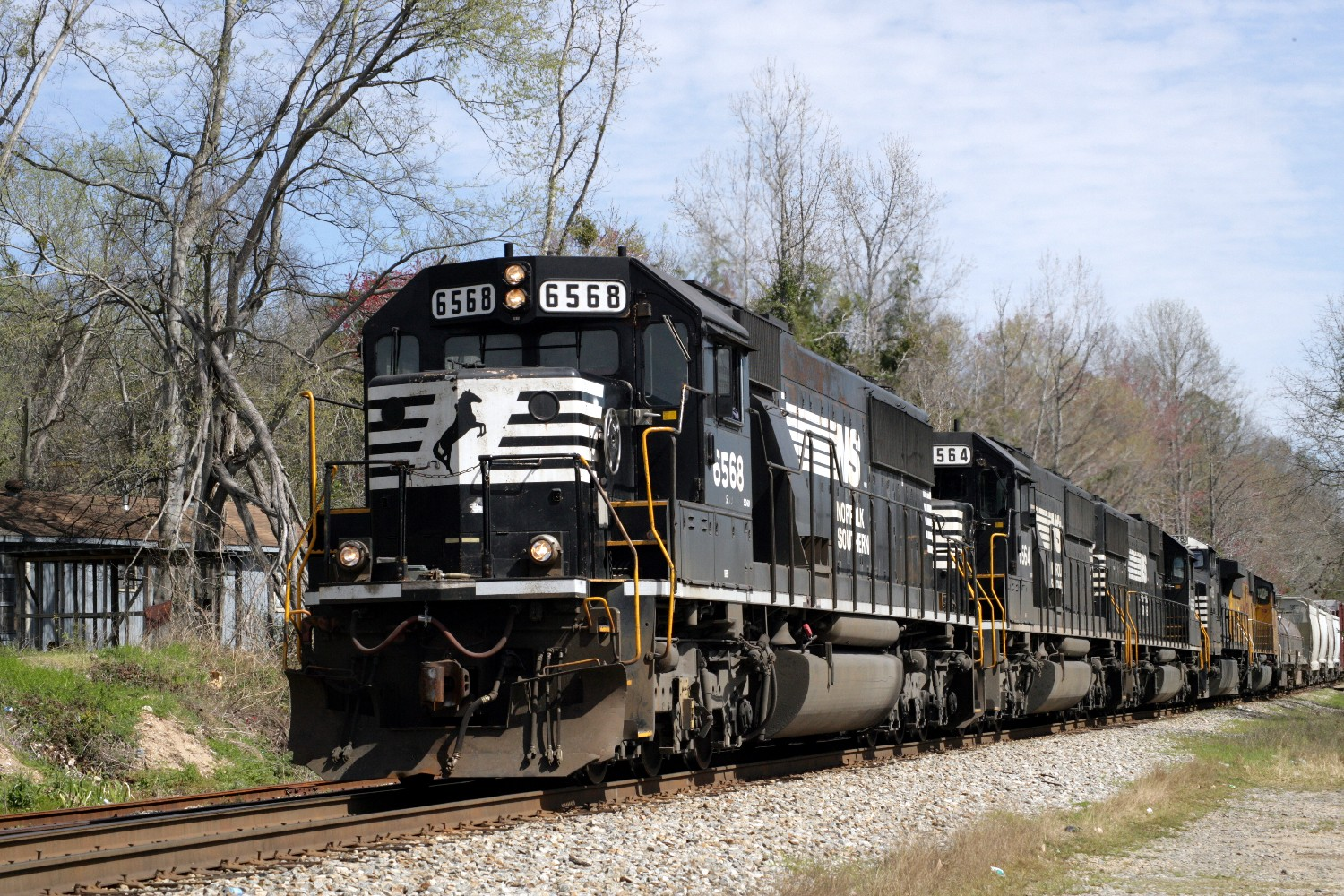
The Norfolk Southern Railway is a typical example of a Class I railroad in the eastern United States.

Class I railroads are the largest rail carriers in the United States. In 1900, there were 132 Class I railroads, but as the result of mergers and bankruptcies, the industry has consolidated and as of April 2023, just six Class I freight railroads remain.

BNSF Railway and Union Pacific Railroad have a duopoly over all transcontinental freight rail lines in the Western United States, while CSX Transportation and Norfolk Southern Railway operate most of the trackage in the Eastern United States, with the Mississippi River being the rough dividing line. Canadian National Railway (via its subsidiary Grand Trunk Corporation) operates north–south lines near the Mississippi River. Canadian Pacific Kansas City, doing business as CPKC, runs from southern Canada, then goes south through the central United States to central Mexico.

In addition, the national passenger railroads in the US and Canada—Amtrak and VIA Rail—would both qualify as Class I if they were freight carriers. Mexico's Ferromex would qualify as a Class I railroad if it had trackage in the United States.

Railroad	Trackage		
Railroad	Canada	United States	Mexico
BNSF Railway	Yes	Yes	No
Canadian National Railway	Yes	Yes (Note: Operated by Grand Trunk Corporation, a wholly owned subsidiary of Canadian National Railway.)	No
CPKC	Yes	Yes	Yes
CSX Transportation	Yes	Yes	No
Norfolk Southern Railway	Yes	Yes	No
Union Pacific Railroad	No	Yes	No

=== Class II ===
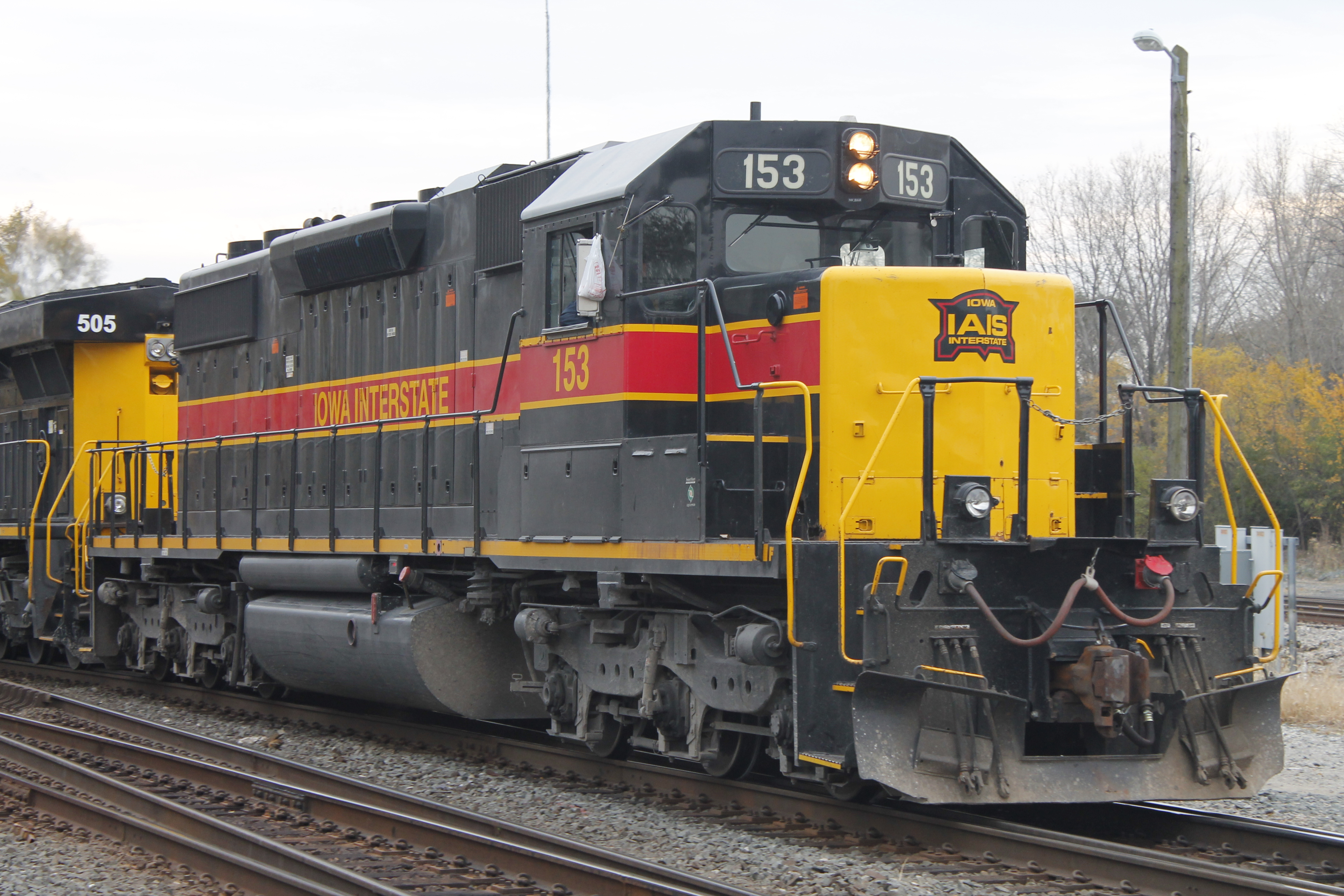
The Iowa Interstate Railroad is a typical example of a Class II regional railroad in Iowa, Nebraska, and Illinois.

A Class II railroad in the United States hauls freight and is mid-sized in terms of operating revenue. Switching and terminal railroads are excluded from Class II status. Railroads considered by the Association of American Railroads as "Regional Railroads" are typically Class II. The Florida East Coast Railway, the Iowa Interstate Railroad, and the Alabama and Gulf Coast Railway are some examples of Class II railroads.

Name	Length	References
Alabama and Gulf Coast Railway	292 mi (470 km)	
Alaska Railroad	656 mi (1,056 km)	
Buffalo and Pittsburgh Railroad	658 mi (1,059 km)	
Central Oregon & Pacific Railroad	305 mi (491 km)	
Dakota, Missouri Valley and Western Railroad	502 mi (808 km)	
Evansville Western Railway	124 mi (200 km)	
Florida East Coast Railway	351 mi (565 km)	
Indiana Rail Road	250 mi (400 km)	
Iowa Interstate Railroad	580 mi (930 km)	
New England Central Railroad	345 mi (555 km)	
New York, Susquehanna and Western Railway	439 mi (707 km)	
Paducah and Louisville Railway	280 mi (450 km)	
Portland and Western Railroad	516 mi (830 km)	
Providence and Worcester Railroad	624 mi (1,004 km)	
Rapid City, Pierre and Eastern Railroad	678 mi (1,091 km)	
Red River Valley and Western Railroad	577 mi (929 km)	
Wheeling and Lake Erie Railway	840 mi (1,350 km)	
Wisconsin and Southern Railroad	748 mi (1,204 km)	

=== Class III ===
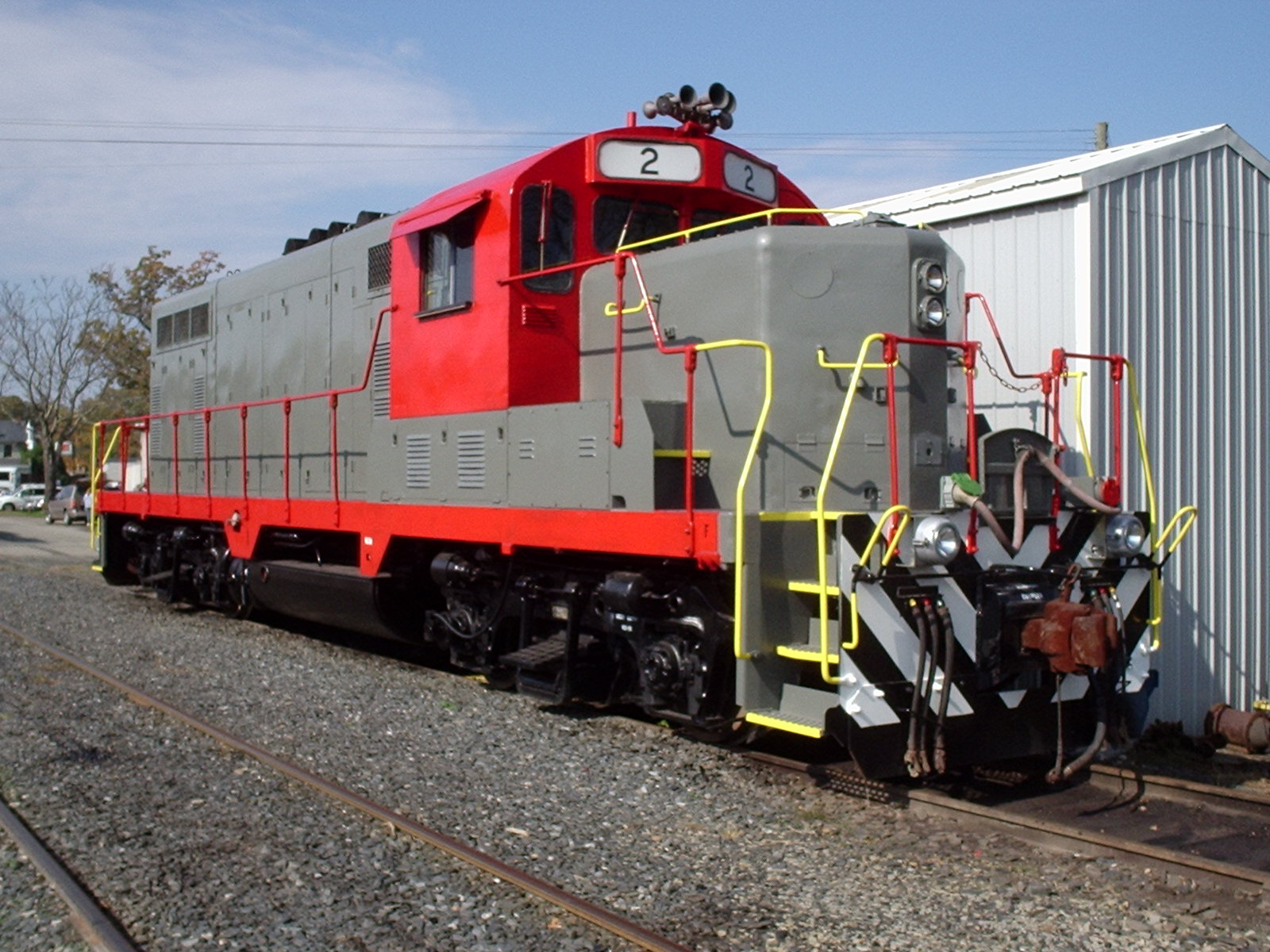
The Buckingham Branch Railroad is a typical example of a Class III shortline in Virginia.

Class III railroads are typically local shortline railroads serving a small number of towns and industries or hauling cars for one or more railroads; often, they once had been branch lines of larger railroads or even abandoned portions of main lines. Some Class III railroads are owned by railroad holding companies such as Genesee & Wyoming or Watco. The Maryland and Delaware Railroad, the Finger Lakes Railway the San Pedro Valley Railroad, Buckingham Branch Railroad, and the Cleveland & Cuyahoga Railway are some examples of Class III railroads.

== See also ==
- List of U.S. Class I railroads
- List of U.S. Class II railroads
- Rail transport in Canada
- Rail transport in Mexico
- Rail transport in the United States
- Timeline of Class I railroads: 1910–1929, 1930–1976, 1977–present

== Sources ==
- Surface Transportation Board FAQs – Economic and Industry Information Archived December 8, 2016, at the Wayback Machine
- STB Ex Parte No. 647 Archived March 4, 2016, at the Wayback Machine
- Stover, John F. (1999). The Routledge Historical Atlas of the American Railroads. New York, NY: Routledge. ISBN 0-415-92140-6.
