= Cleveland Commercial Railroad =

Overview
- Headquarters: Cleveland, Ohio, U.S.
- Dates of operation: June 2004–present
- Predecessor: New York Central Railroad

Technical
- Track gauge: 4 ft 8 1/2 in (1,435 mm) standard gauge
- Length: 35 miles (56 km)

The Cleveland Commercial Railroad (CCR) is a shortline railroad which operates in Cuyahoga County in Ohio in the United States. Founded as a freight-only railroad in 2004, it leases and has trackage rights on lines owned by the Norfolk Southern and the Wheeling and Lake Erie Railway. It also operates an industrial switching railroad at the Port of Cleveland.

== Construction of the track ==
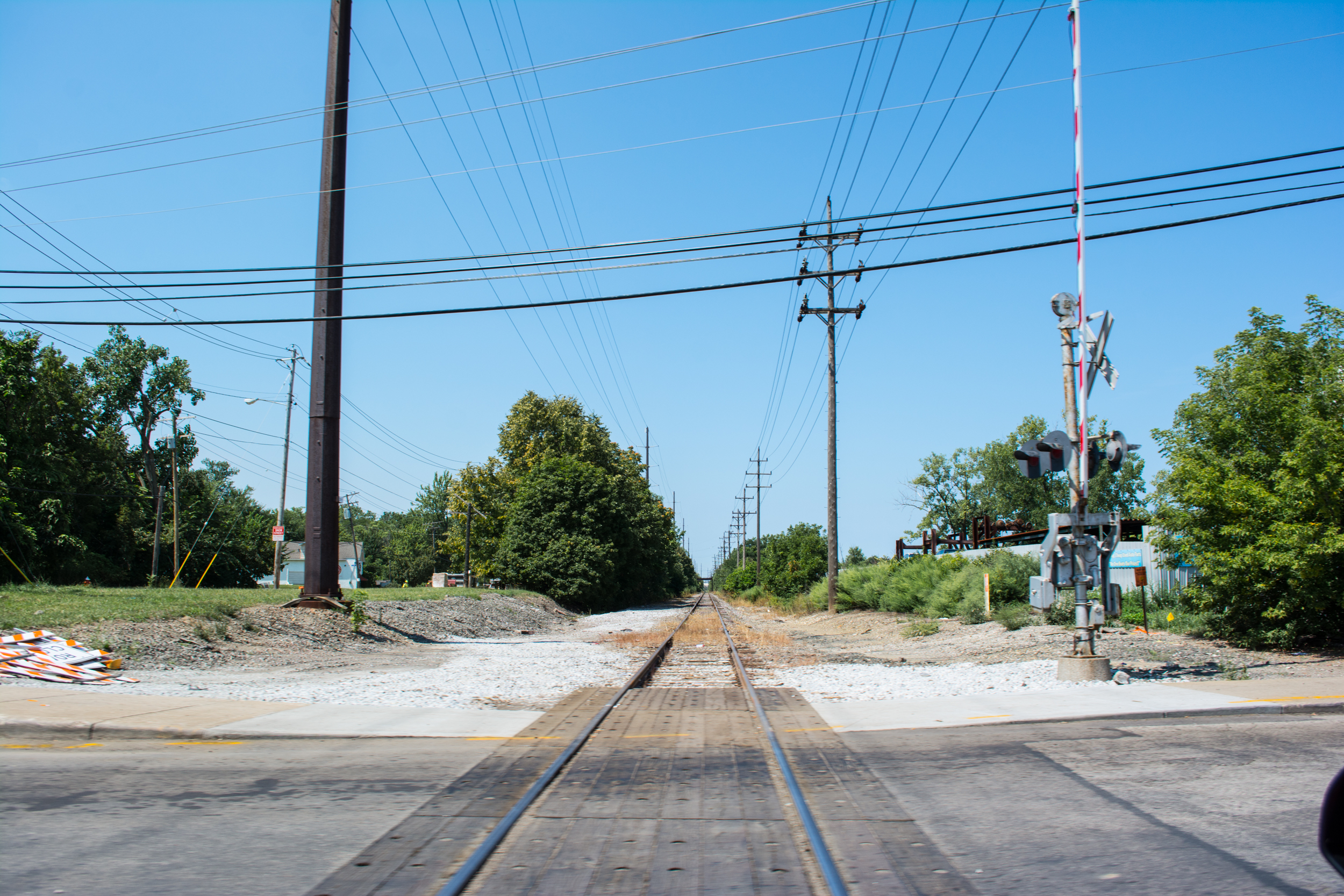
Former Cleveland and Mahoning Valley tracks, now leased by the CCR, at Harvard Avenue in Cleveland, Ohio

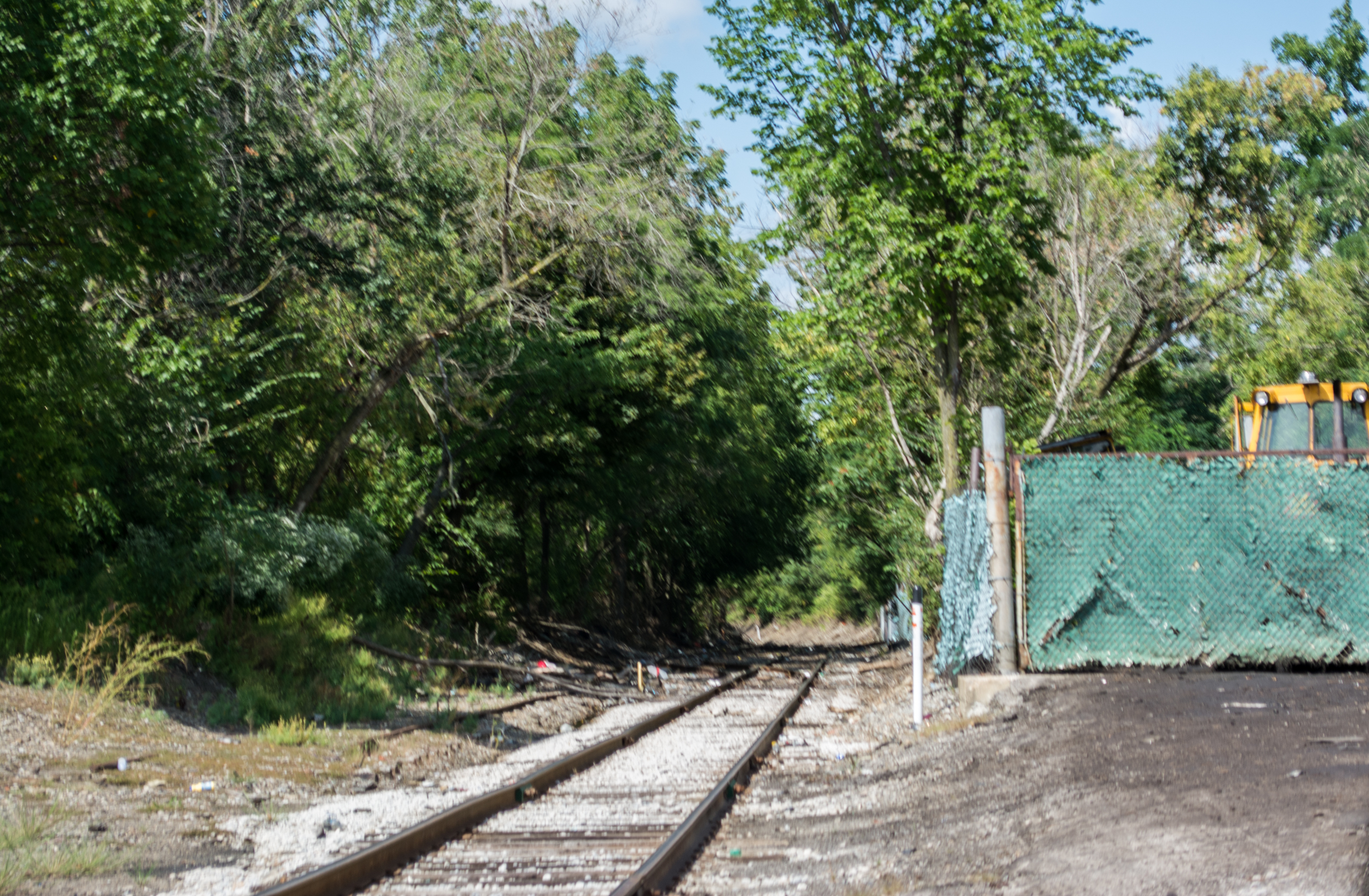
Former Connotton Valley tracks, now leased by the CCR, at Miles Avenue and E. 104th Street in Cleveland, Ohio

In 1853, the Cleveland and Mahoning Valley Railroad (C&MV) finished laying its tracks through what was then Newburgh Township (south of Cleveland). After a series of owners, it ended up in the hands of the Norfolk Southern in 1999.

From 1881 to 1882, the Connotton Valley Railway built its line through Newburgh (now largely annexed by the city of Cleveland). After a series of bankruptcies, the line ended up in the hands of the Wheeling and Lake Erie Railway. A series of consolidations and mergers left the road in the hands of the Norfolk Southern. In 1990, the Norfolk Southern sold the road to a new corporation, also named the Wheeling and Lake Erie Railway.

== Founding the CCR ==
In 2002, the Wheeling & Lake Erie Railway entered into a lease with a start-up railroad, the Connotton Valley Railway, Inc. The lease covered 10.4 miles (16.7 km) of track from the Wheeling's terminus in downtown Cleveland to Glenwillow, Ohio. The agreement also gave the lessee access to the Wheeling's train yard at Falls Junction (near Glenwillow) and to several sidings.

The Connotton's lease ended in 2004, and the Wheeling was looking for a new operator for the shortline. The Wheeling approached Michael Kole, a trustee of the Midwest Railway Preservation Society who had experience operating freight trains. Kole contacted the society's president, Bill Brown, a former insurance executive, who agreed to join the venture and provide administrative expertise. With co-investor Douglas Fink, the Cleveland Commercial Railroad Co. LLC was founded and became the new lessee. A month later, the United States Department of Transportation awarded a $25 million ($41,600,000 in 2024 dollars) low-interest loan to allow the Wheeling & Lake Erie Railway to modernize, repair, and replace 315 miles (507 km) of track. The work included the CCR's shortline.

== Expansion ==
In June 2009, CCR signed a second lease agreement, expanding its system. The lease covered 25 miles (40 km) of Norfolk Southern track between the Von Willer yard (near E. 93rd Street and Harvard Avenue) in Cleveland and Aurora, Ohio.

In January 2011, the CCR signed an agreement with the Cleveland-Cuyahoga County Port Authority, which operates the Port of Cleveland, to run a new switching service, called the Cleveland Harbor Belt - CHB. Although only a few thousand feet of track were built, the service made it much easier for Great Lakes freighters to move cargo directly onto rail cars, which would be pushed by a CHB locomotive onto the tracks, or connect to a train of a nearby Class I railroad.

That same month, the CCR won a $170,000 ($200,000 in 2024 dollars) loan from the Ohio Rail Development Commission to build a 2,300-foot (700 m) spur in Bedford Heights, Ohio, which would allow the CCR to serve four steel companies. Brown discovered the spur, which had gone unmarked on railroad maps, in late 2010. The state loan allowed CCR to replace about 400 feet (120 m) of missing track, cut back vegetation, repair and rehabilitate the existing rails and track bed to make the spur usable, and a loading/unloading area.

The CCR was sold to Omnitrax, and is now called the Cleveland & Cuyahoga Railway LLC - CCRL.

== See also ==
- Cleveland railroad history
