= G. C. Kuhlman Car Company =

G.C. Kuhlman Car Company
- Company type: Subsidiary
- Industry: Rail transport
- Founded: 1892; 134 years ago
- Defunct: 1932
- Fate: Defunct
- Headquarters: Cleveland, Ohio, USA
- Area served: United States
- Products: Streetcars and interurbans

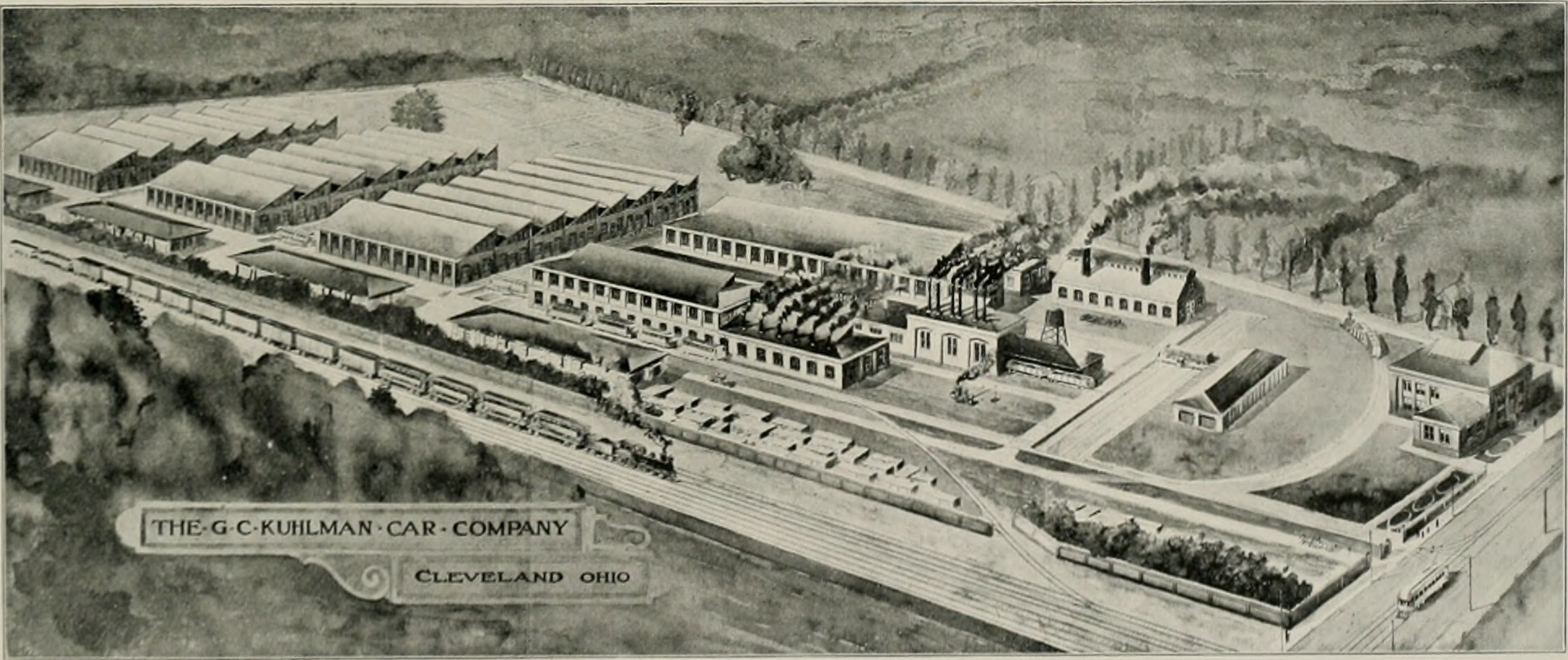

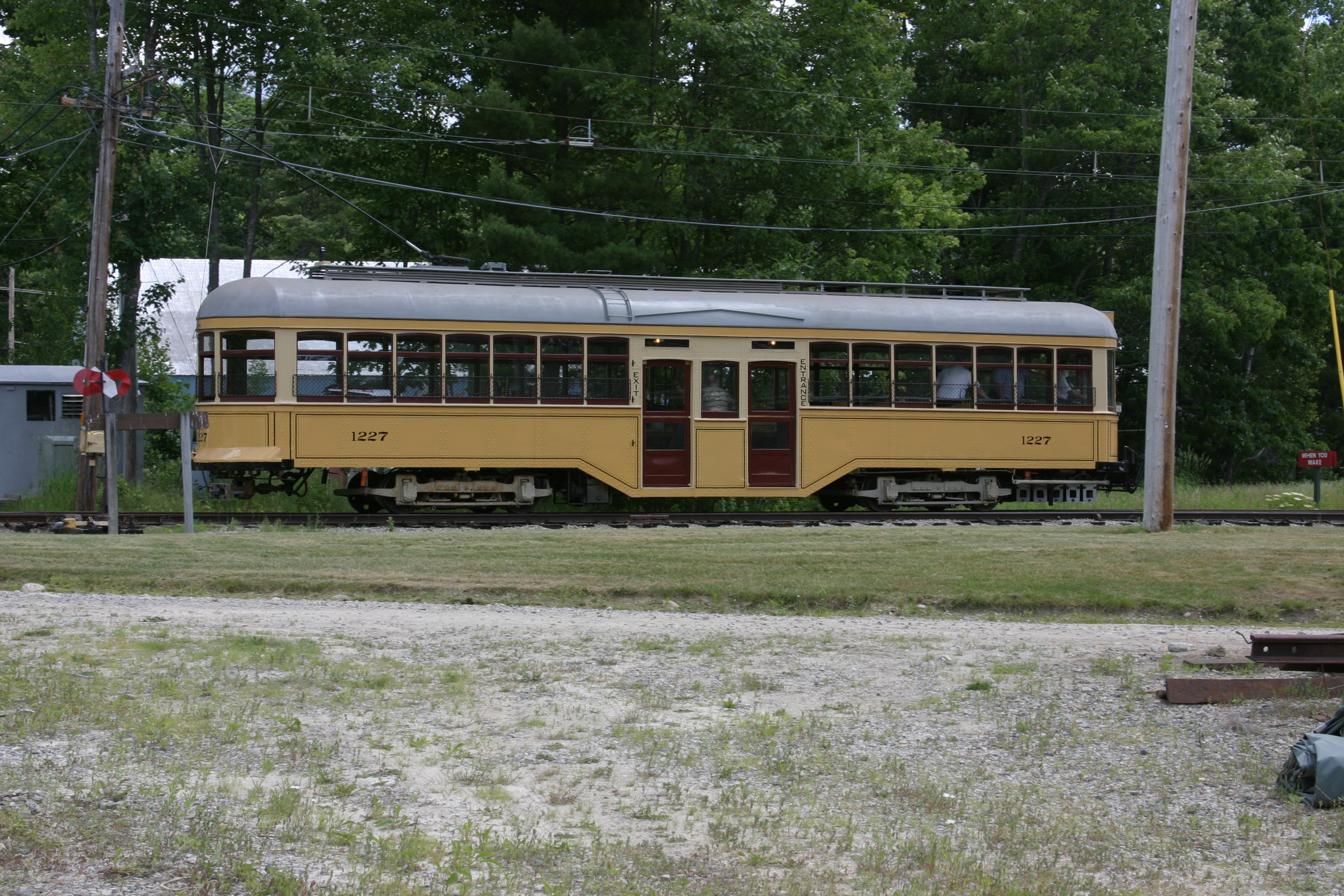
A Kuhlman-built ex-Cleveland streetcar preserved at the Seashore Trolley Museum

The G. C. Kuhlman Car Company was a leading American manufacturer of streetcars and interurbans in the early 20th century. The company was based in Cleveland, Ohio.

The Kuhlman Car Company was founded in 1892 by Gustav C. Kuhlman (c.1859-1915), his father and three other brothers. It was acquired by the J. G. Brill Company in 1904, but continued building under the Kuhlman name. It was reorganized in 1931 as J. G. Brill of Ohio, but ceased operations completely in 1932.

Before it closed, as the market for electric streetcars and interurban cars began to contract, Brill gave Kuhlman the additional task of building steel diners.

The company's main clients were railways in Ohio, Michigan, New York, and Illinois, as well as streetcar operating companies in Akron, Detroit, Cleveland and Montreal, Quebec.

== Products ==
- SE ST streetcar
- Peter Witt streetcar

== Clients ==
- Boston Elevated Railway
- Chicago Aurora and Elgin Railroad
- Indiana Railroad
- Louisville Railway Company
- The Milwaukee Electric Railway and Light Company
- New York Railways
- Northern Ohio Traction and Light
- Montreal Street Railway Company
- Shaker Heights Rapid Transit
- Streetcars in Cleveland
