= Cleveland & Cuyahoga Railway =

Overview
- Parent company: OmniTRAX
- Headquarters: Cleveland, Ohio
- Reporting mark: CCRL
- Locale: Cuyahoga County, Ohio
- Dates of operation: 2019–Present
- Predecessor: Cleveland Commercial Railroad

Technical
- Track gauge: 4 ft 8 1/2 in (1,435 mm) standard gauge
- Length: 12 mi

The Cleveland & Cuyahoga Railway LLC (reporting mark CCRL) is a class III Short-line railroad operating in Cleveland, Ohio. The railroad is operated by OmniTRAX which currently operates about 12 miles of track between Von Willer Yard in Cleveland and Solon. The railroad connects with the Norfolk Southern Railway in Cleveland and provides freight, railcar repair, and railcar storage.

== History ==
=== Cleveland Commercial Railroad ===
The Cleveland & Cuyahoga Railway was formed as a branch off of operations of the Cleveland Commercial Railroad. In 2019, OmniTRAX announced that the Cleveland Commercial Railroad and its subsidiary, the Cleveland Harbor Belt Railroad would be acquired by a managed affiliate. During that time, Cleveland Commercial operated about 35 miles of track in northern Ohio and handled commodities including:

- Steel.
- Scrap metal.
- Grain.
- Chemicals.

The railroad interchanged with the Norfolk Southern Railway and the Wheeling and Lake Erie Railway.

Following the gain, the Cleveland Commercial Railroad was renamed Cleveland & Cuyahoga Railway, LLC. The Cleveland Harbor Belt Railroad was separately renamed the Cleveland Port Railway

=== 2023 discontinuance ===
In 2023, the Cleveland & Cuyahoga Railway sought permission from the Surface Transportation Board to discontinue service over approximately 10.4 miles of track in Cuyahoga County. The line extended from milepost 15.5 at Falls Junction in Glenwillow to milepost 5.1 in Cleveland and was owned by the Wheeling and Lake Erie Railway.

CCRL's lease of the line was terminated by mutual agreement with the Wheeling and Lake Erie effective on May 31, 2023. After which the Wheeling and Lake Erie resumed operations over the route. CCRL filed its petition for a discontinuance exemption with the Surface Transportation Board on June 1, 2023. The board approved the discontinuance in a decision on August 24, 2023.

=== 2025 discontinuance ===
In 2025, Norfolk Southern and the Cleveland & Cuyahoga Railway jointly filed for the abandonment and discontinuance of service, respectively, over approximately 7 miles of railroad between milepost 15.0 in Cuyahoga County and milepost 22.0 in Portage County. The route also passes through Geauga County.

The applicants stated that no local freight traffic had moved over the seven-mile section for at least two years and that any overhead traffic could be rerouted over other lines. Norfolk Southern sought authority to abandon its interest in the route while CCRL sought to discontinue its common-carrier service over it.

== Operations ==
The Cleveland & Cuyahoga Railway currently operates approximately 12 miles of track in northeastern Ohio. Its present system extends from Von Willer Yard in Cleveland southeast to Solon. The railroad connects with Norfolk Southern in Cleveland.

In addition to conventional freight service, CCRL offers transloading as well as railcar repair and storage. OmniTRAX markets the railroad for industrial and multimodal development in the Cleveland area. The railroad's tariff permits cars with a maximum gross weight of up to 286,000 pounds, subject to applicable restrictions.

== See also ==
- Cleveland Commercial Railroad
- Newburgh and South Shore Railroad
- List of Ohio railroads
