= Streetcars in Cleveland =

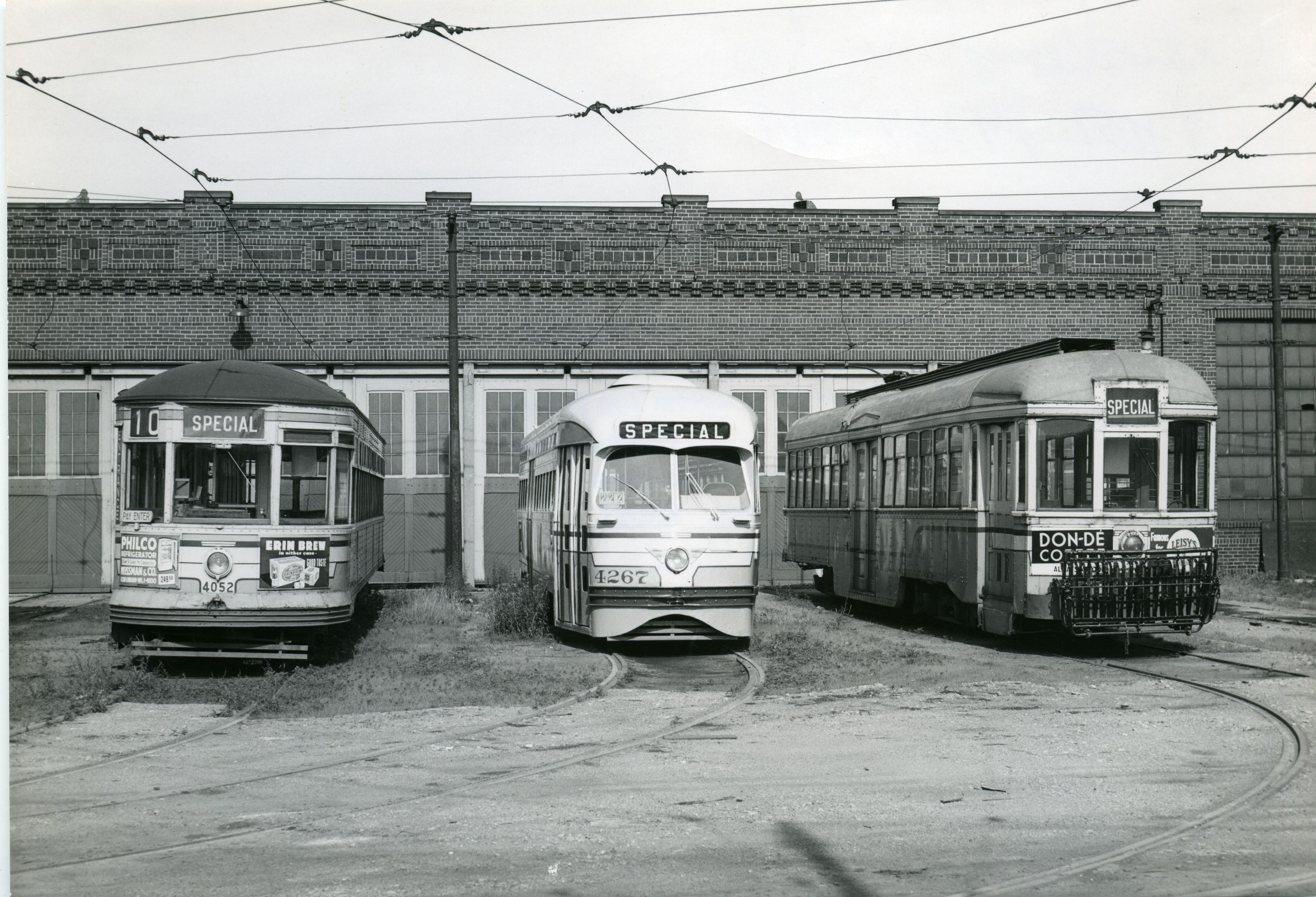
Cleveland Railway Company cars #4052, #4267 and #319

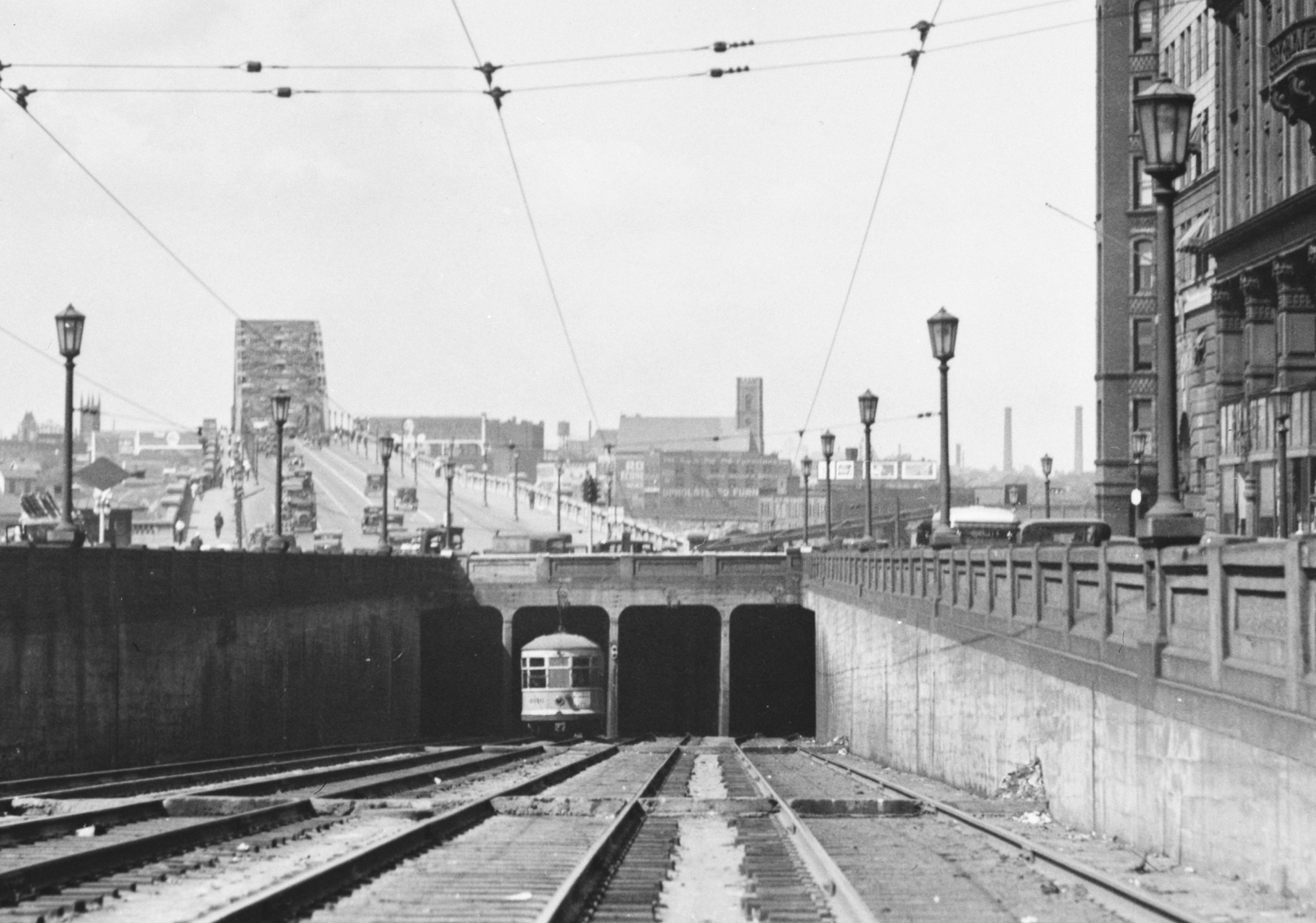
Short subways led to the lower deck of the Detroit–Superior Bridge. Street cars entered the subways through open wells located in the center of the roadways. This undated photograph shows the Superior Avenue entrance.

Like in most large cities in the United States, there existed a large network of streetcars in Cleveland, Ohio, in the late 19th and early 20th century. The city's first horsecar line began operation in 1860. Cleveland hosted the first electric streetcar line in the United States, opened in 1884, though this initial service would prove unsuccessful. Electrification was again initiated in 1888 with more permanence, and a small system of cable cars was established the following year. Initially formed from several distinct operators, the streetcar system was consolidated under one private company, the Cleveland Railway, in 1910 after attempts to form a municipal system failed. The Peter Witt streetcar was developed for use in the city. Streetcar service ended in 1954 as a result of the plan to build what would become the rapid transit Red Line across Cleveland, which would have feeder services provided by buses.

Cleveland additionally served as a hub of interurban lines with remnants of the network still in operation as part of RTA Rapid Transit. The subject of streetcars in Cleveland primarily addresses traction operations which ran directly on city streets and interacted with other road traffic, whereas the modern light rail lines are descendant from a system which had significant dedicated right of way.

== History ==
The first horsecar line to operate in the city was the East Cleveland Railway Company; traffic was begun on September 4, 1860. The Kinsman Street line was completed in quick succession. That year, the original franchise was extended on Euclid from Willson west to Case, thence to Prospect, also from Case to Sterling Avenue to Prospect. Several additional street railway companies were chartered over the next decades.

On July 26, 1884 a transformation took place when the first electric streetcar in America was operated in Cleveland over a mile of track. The installation utilized the Bentley-Knight system, wherein current was carried on underground conductors laid in conduits between the tracks, owing to popular objections to overhead wires. Power was generated from a Brush arc light machine in the Euclid Avenue car barns. Tracks were of old strap rail variety laid on wooden stringers. Safety issues plagued the electrical system, especially during rain and snow. Operations lasted less than a year, with runs replaced by horsecars.

Consolidation began in 1885 when the city council authorized the Woodland Avenue and the West Side Street Railway Companies to merge. A new electric line was installed in 1888, which included more conventional overhead line powering cars via a trolley pole. Most lines had been electrified by 1891. In 1893 a grand consolidation took place, when the Cleveland City Railway Company and the competing Cleveland Electric Railway Company were both authorized. These were popularly known as the "Big Consolidated" and "Little Consolidated".

When the Cleveland City Cable Company organized in 1889, the right to use a cable was granted by the council. It began service on December 18 the following year along Superior Street. Interurban services in Cleveland began on October 26, 1895 when the Akron, Bedford and Cleveland Railroad began running from Akron, entering the city via the Cleveland Electric Railway line in Newburg. The cable car line on Payne Avenue ceased service on January 20, 1901, ending Cleveland's use of the mode.

The streetcar strike of 1899 featured over half of the year marked with rioting and violence in the city as employees of the Big Consolidated sought to unionize, demanding better conditions. The strike began on June 10; Cleveland City Railway hired strikebreakers to continue service, but the Holmden barns were attacked in a riot on June 20. An apparent end came on June 25 as most of the strikers were rehired and service was resumed on the former schedules, though strikers would continue to attack tracks and trolleys in the following weeks. State troopers were called in on July 21 to quell rioting as a string of bombings began which would last for five days. Management made its intent clear to hire individuals not under union contracts. The strike was mostly broken by the end of the month and troops were withdrawn from Cleveland, though some violence and bombings continued through the year.

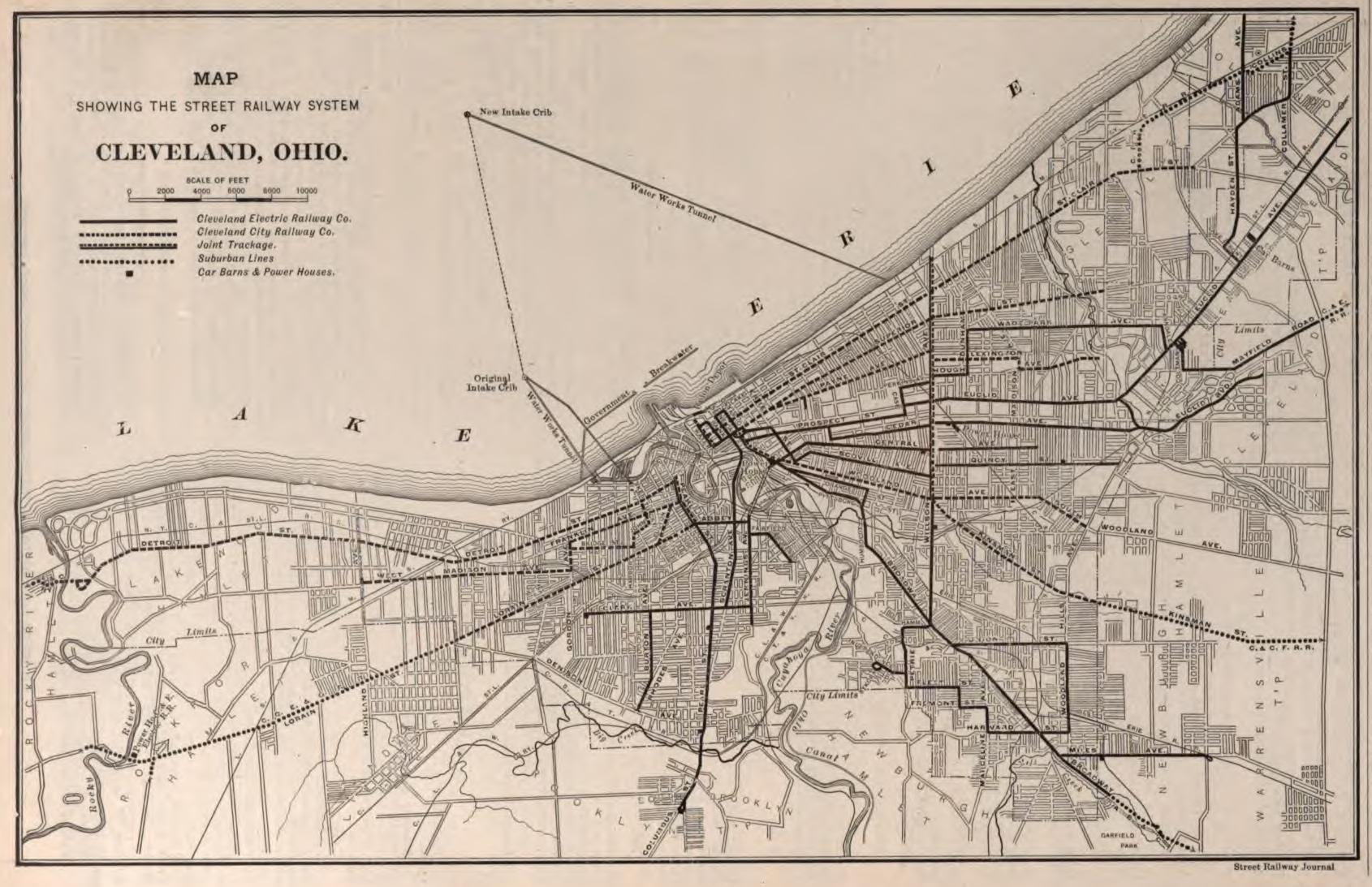
Cleveland street railways in 1900

The two streetcar systems were eventually merged in 1900 forming the Cleveland Electric Railway Company. This merger began the Great Street Car War. Soon after, Tom L. Johnson was elected mayor with the pronouncement of a three cent (Note: equivalent to $1.16 in 2025 adjusted for inflation) streetcar fare. Streetcar fares had initially been set at five cents, (Note: 5¢ in 1860 and 1900 is equivalent to $1.79 and $1.94, respectively, in 2025 adjusted for inflation) an amount kept fairly static (except for a time in the late 1870s when the West Side line was authorized to charge a six cent (Note: equivalent to $2.07 in 2025 adjusted for inflation) fare or twenty for a dollar (Note: equivalent to $34.55 in 2025 adjusted for inflation)). Then followed in quick succession injunctions, the organizing of "low fare" companies, who were given grants as rapidly as the old franchises expired, midnight deals, and other questionable business practices. In 1903, the two private companies were consolidated into the Cleveland Electric Railway Company. Subsequent elections strengthened the position of the mayor until a day of free rides in 1907 was followed by a strike of streetcar men. Financial distress had become apparent and a Federal court appointed receivers. Voters refused to sustain new grants at a referendum election. Finally, Judge Tayler of the United States District Court consented to act as arbiter, preparing a comprehensive settlement which would be known as the "Tayler Plan", which was accepted by the voters in 1910. Fares were set at three cents, (Note: equivalent to $1.04 in 2025 adjusted for inflation) with one penny (Note: equivalent to $0.35 in 2025 adjusted for inflation) for a transfer.

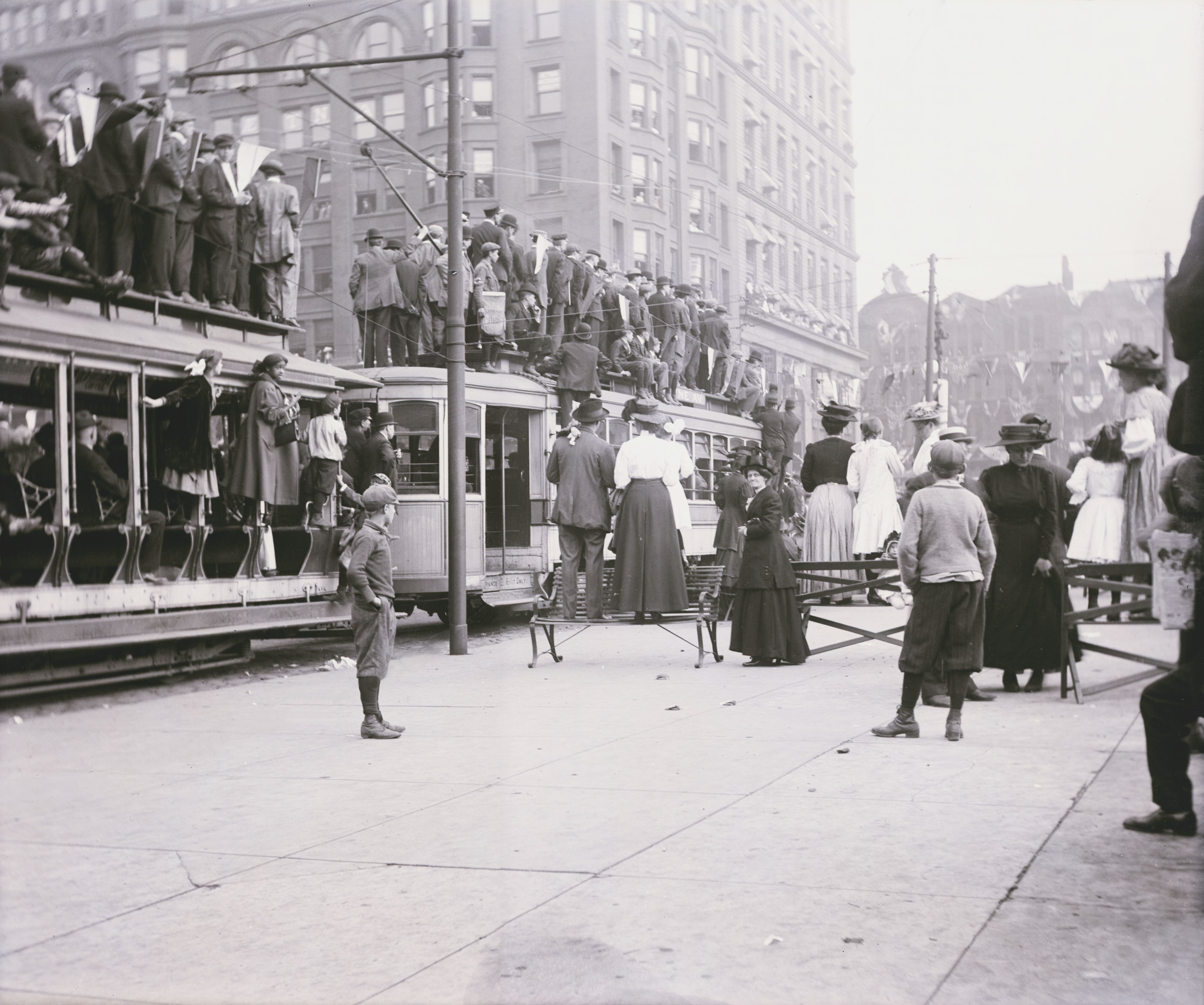
A crowd watches the Cuyahoga County centennial parade as it passes through Public Square in October 1910. Parade watchers can be seen standing on top of streetcars and on park benches.

That year, the Cleveland Electric Railway Company would merge with the Municipal Traction Company and form the Cleveland Railway. When Peter Witt was appointed street railway commissioner, the primary issue with the streetcar network was severe congestion without the possibility of improving headways. He implemented an improved skip-stop scheme and acquired additional rolling stock which was intended to increase capacity. A more effective solution was found in a new car design of Witt's specifications which featured both a front and middle car door. The design allowed passengers the option to pay either as they entered the car at the front or before they alighted from the middle door — this significantly reduced queuing and dwell times at stops. The new style of streetcar, introduced in 1914, would go on to be utilized by several worldwide streetcar systems and continues to be referred to by the designer's name: the Peter Witt streetcar. Ridership peaked in 1926. The company converted a few streetcar lines after 1936, but the onset of World War II temporarily stopped any further conversions.

In 1942, the Cleveland Transit System took over the operation of all streetcar, bus and trackless trolley lines from the Cleveland Railway. Ridership even ballooned to the point that the system began planning upgrades. CTS sought to update their aging streetcar fleet and ordered 75 new PCC streetcars for service. Plans would evolve to concentrate on new subway construction and consultants recommended closing the streetcar system, citing low capacity. Following the war, CTS undertook a program of replacing all existing streetcar lines with either trackless trolleys or buses. The lightly-used PCC's were sold to the Toronto Transit Commission in 1953, leaving Peter Witt cars to finish service in Cleveland.

The last CTS streetcar ran on January 24, 1954 with a free ride celebration on the Madison line from Public Square to West 65th and Bridge.

By 2023, there were very few traces of the system remaining. The substation on Larchmont Boulevard had been converted to commercial space. Trolley poles along Fairmount Boulevard have been repurposed for streetlights, with some still featuring Cleveland Railway Company medallions.

== List of electric streetcar lines ==
The following table lists the electric streetcar routes of Cleveland.

Line name	No.	Electrified	Discontinued	Notes
Broadway	19	December 1, 1889	August 15, 1947	Orange–Humboldt (original route); Miles extension to W&LE station, May 1890; Attached to Wade Park line, July–December 1898; Linked with St. Clair line, August 1903; Miles extension to East 131st, 1903; Rerouted from Orange to Pittsburg, October 1906; Unlinked from St. Clair line, April 1908
Broadway–Garfield	–	Opened c. 1895	August 25, 1915	
Buckeye (South Woodland)	13	February 11, 1893	June 30, 1948	Ontario–Woodland–East 84th (original route shared w/ Woodland line); Linked with Lorain line via Superior Viaduct, 1893; South Woodland extension to Woodhill, 1895; South Woodland extension to East 116, 1906; Unlinked from Lorain line, January 1913; South Woodland extension to East 130th, December 1915
Cedar	8	September 12, 1889	June 15, 1948	Public Square–Euclid–East 9th–Prospect–East 22nd–Cedar–Murray Hill–Mayfield–Coltman (original route); Linked with Jennings–Brooklyn line, May 1893; Branch extension Cedar Glen–Euclid Heights–Edgehill, 1897; Coltman truncated to Cedar at Murray Hill, 1897; Unlinked from Jennings–Brooklyn line, December 1898; Truncated to East Blvd, August 1900; Cedar Glen–Euclid Heights–Edgehill transferred to Euclid line, 1900; Extension to Union Depot, 1901; Linked with Jennings–Brooklyn line, August to October 1903; Branch service via 105th to Luna Park, 1907; Shaker Lakes branch added via Fairmount to Lee, 1907; Truncated from Union Depot to Ontario, June 1908; Luna Park service withdrawn, June 1908; Shaker Lakes branch transferred to Euclid line, 1909; Cedar extension to Taylor, November 1929
Central (first)	–	1890	April 24, 1907	Lakeside–Public Square–Euclid–East 9th–Central–East 83rd (original route); Branch service on Quincy between East 57th and East 89th Quincy branch transferred to Scovill line, January 1895; Quincy branch Luna Park to East 55th transferred from Scovill line, January 1907
Central (second)	–	Opened June 8, 1908	June 15, 1938	Restored as part of Denison–Fulton line Unlinked from Denison–Fulton line, February 1909; Ontario–Central (original route); Rerouted via East 14th and Euclid, September 1909; Rerouted via East 9th, October 1912; Rerouted via East 14th, January 1917; Rerouted via East 9th, March 1924
Clark	23		August 15, 1953	
Clifton	27		November 15, 1947	
Detroit	26	1893	August 25, 1951	
East 9th	–	Opened June 6, 1915	October 4, 1938	
East 30th	17	Opened December 16, 1919	November 15, 1940	
East 55th (Willson)	16	Opened January 1, 1895	March 6, 1953	East 55th–Broadway–Hamm–East 49th–Fleet–East 65th–Lansing–East 71st–Harvard–Broadway–Miles (original route); Cut back to Harvard; Southbound rerouted via East 57th, 1901; Truncated from Lake Erie to St. Clair, October 1912; St. Clair extension to Hamilton between East 38th and East 40th, October 1912; Rerouted via East 71st to Grant; St. Clair extension removed, August 1922
East 55th–Washington	16	Opened June 16, 1922	July 31, 1948	
East 55th–Washington Park			July 4, 1930	Through service to East 55th discontinued, June 1922
East 79th	2	Opened May 28, 1914	November 15, 1940	St. Clair–East 82nd–Broad–East 79th–Woodland (original route); East 79th extension to Bessemer, August 1927
East 105th	10		January 31, 1948	
Euclid–East 140th	6	Opened 1889	April 26, 1952	Branch extension East 123–Euclid–Lakefront–Hayden–St. Clair–East 152; Branch service St. Clair–East 140–Westropp–East 142–Lake Shore–Euclid Beach, 1895; Rerouted from Lakefront to Windermere, 1897; Euclid Beach branch transferred to St. Clair line, October 1908; East 152 extension to Saranac, March 1910; St. Clair rerouted to London, April 1910; Euclid Beach branch transferred from St. Clair line, April 1914; Euclid Beach branch transferred to St. Clair line, July 1915; St. Clair rerouted to East 152–Saranac, June 1917; Truncated to Windermere, August 1949
Euclid–East 212th	6	1889	April 16, 1948	Lakeside–Public Square–Euclid–East 9th–Prospect–East 40–Euclid–East 123 (original route); Euclid extension East 123–Ivanhoe, 1896; Rerouted from Prospect to Euclid between East 9–East 22, September 1900; Rerouted from Lakeside to Union Depot, 1901; CP&E extension Ivanhoe–East 212, 1903; Semi-linked with West 14 line via Central Viaduct, 1903 to June 1908; Truncated from Union Depot to Public Square, December 1912; Prospect rerouted to Euclid, September 1915; Euclid truncated to Catalpa, November 1925; Euclid extension to East 212, November 1930
Fairfield	–	1891	April 3, 1935	
Fairmount (Shaker Lakes)	9	Opened 1897	July 30, 1948	Euclid line–East Blvd–Cedar Glen–Cedar–Fairmount–Lee (original route); Rerouted via Cedar line, 1908; Rerouted via Euclid line, 1909; Rerouted via East 40–Prospect; Rerouted via Euclid, September 1915; Extension to Canterbury, June 1929
Fulton	24		April 30, 1948	
Green (Shaker)	–	December 17, 1913	Present	Branch from Fairmount to Coventry–Shaker–Courtland (original route); Extension to South Woodland, May 1915 (Shaker Blvd was later realigned); Rerouted from Euclid–East Blvd–Fairmount to Ontario–Broadway–Pittsburgh–C&Y, April 1920; CIRR extension to Warrensville, December 1928; C&Y rerouted from Ontario–Broadway–Pittsburgh to Terminal Tower, July 1930; CIRR extension to Green, November 1936; Renamed to Green, September 1979; Light rail conversion, October 1981; Linked with Waterfront Line, July 1996
Harvard–Dennison	18	Opened December 1, 1913	March 6, 1948	
Kinsman	14	February 11, 1893	March 25, 1950	Public Square–Woodland–Kinsman–C&P (original route); Linked with Lorain line via Superior Viaduct, before 1908; Kinsman extension to East 104, 1901; Kinsman extension to East 140, 1904; Truncated to Public Square, as of 1908; Kinsman extension to East 154, November 1919; Kinsman extension to East 163, November 1937; Kinsman truncated to East 159, February 1941
Lorain	22	February 11, 1893	June 14, 1952	
Madison	25	1893	January 24, 1954	
Mayfield (Euclid Heights)	7	Opened 1897	September 6, 1949	Cedar line runs up Cedar Glen–Euclid Heights–Edgehill (original route); Linked with Euclid line via East Blvd, 1900; Double-linked with West 14 line Euclid Heights extension to Coventry–Mayfield–Lee; Unlinked from West 14 line, December 1909; Mayfield extension to Center, June 1929; Linked with Lorain line, November 1943
Payne–Hough	–	January 20, 1901	October 31, 1935	Converted from cable traction
St. Clair–Nottingham	1	September 12, 1893	November 3, 1951	Detroit–Superior Viaduct–East 9–St. Clair–East 103 (original route); Unlinked from Detroit line, August 1903; Linked with Broadway line, August 1903; Extension to East 140, 1905; St. Clair extension to London, September 1906; Unlinked from Broadway line, April 1908; St. Clair extension to Dille, May 1920; Rerouted from Public Square to Cleveland Mall, November 1926; Rerouted from Cleveland Mall to Public Square, August 1932; Truncated to East 129, April 1951
St. Clair–East 140th	1	Opened May 16, 1905	May 4, 1948	Seasonal branch extension East 140–Lake Shore–Euclid Beach, May 1905; Unlinked from Broadway line, April 1908; Full service to Euclid Beach via East 140–Lake Shore, October 1908; Euclid Beach branch transferred from Euclid line, October 1908; Euclid Beach branch transferred to Euclid line, April 1914; Branch rerouted via East 111–CP&E–Aspinwall–East 140–Lake Shore–Euclid Beach, March 1917; Branch rerouted via Aspinwall–Saranac–East 152–Lake Shore–Euclid Beach, September 1917; Branch rerouted via St. Clair–East 140–Lake Shore, July 1921; Rerouted from Public Square to Cleveland Mall, November 1926; Rerouted from Cleveland Mall to Public Square, August 1932; East 140th branch transferred to Superior line, March 1943; East 140th branch transferred from Superior line, October 1946
St. Clair–Collinwood–Beach	1	Opened September 16, 1917; Opened April 14, 1937; Opened May 5, 1948	August 16, 1936; August 15, 1947; April 7, 1951	Public Square–St. Clair–East 152–Waterloo–East 156–Lake Shore–Euclid Beach (original route); Rerouted from Public Square to Cleveland Mall, November 1926; Sackett branch closed, 1929; Rerouted from Cleveland Mall to Public Square, August 1932
Scovill	11	October 23, 1889	May 6, 1946	
Scranton	–	1890	April 1, 1929	
Superior	3	July 1, 1900	March 20, 1953	Converted from cable haulage. Union Depot–West 9–Superior–East 105 (original route); Linked with West Madison line via Superior Viaduct, July 1900; Extension to East 117, 1905; Unlinked from Madison line, linked with Detroit line, May 1908; Linked with Clifton line, July–November 1908; Unlinked from Detroit line, February 1909; Extension to East 123, June 1910; Extension East 123–Arlington–East 125–St. Clair–East 129, November 1915; Euclid Beach branch transferred from St. Clair line, March 1943; Euclid Beach branch transferred to St. Clair line, October 1946
Union	15	January 9, 1893	September 2, 1947	
Union Depot	–	Opened December 16, 1912	June 15, 1930	
Wade Park	4	Opened 1889	April 15, 1939	
West 14th	–	May 19, 1889		
West 25th–Broadview	20		July 1, 1950	
West 25th–Pearl	20	September 18, 1889	July 31, 1947	
West 25th–State	20		August 15, 1953	
West 65th	–	Opened July 25, 1910	April 1, 1915	
Woodland	12	February 11, 1893	March 15, 1948	Ontario–Woodland–East 84th (original route shared w/ Buckeye line); Linked with Lorain line via Superior Viaduct, 1893; Woodland extension to East 121st, 1906; Unlinked from Lorain line, January 1913; Woodland extension to East 130th, October 1915

== Concurrencies with interurban lines ==
Line name	No.	Notes
Broadway–Garfield	–	Used tracks of the Northern Ohio Traction and Light Company (Akron, Bedford and Cleveland Railroad)
Clifton	27	Used tracks of the Lake Shore Electric Railway
Euclid–East 140th	6	Used tracks of the Cleveland, Painesville and Eastern Railroad (Main Line)
Kinsman	14	Used tracks of the Eastern Ohio Traction Company (Cleveland and Chagrin Falls Railway)
Lorain	22	Used tracks of the Cleveland, Southwestern and Columbus Railway
Mayfield	7	Used tracks of the Eastern Ohio Traction Company (Cleveland and Eastern Traction Company)
St. Clair–Nottingham	1	Used tracks of the Cleveland, Painesville and Eastern Railroad (Shore Line)

== Trackless trolley routes ==
Cleveland Railway began converting streetcar routes to trackless trolley in 1936 with the Hough Avenue line.

No.	Name	Commenced	Discontinued
19	Broadway	December 1, 1947	June 14, 1963
13	Buckeye	September 8, 1948	October 19, 1962
8	Cedar	June 16, 1948	April 12, 1963
27	Clifton	July 5, 1949	November 14, 1958
26	Detroit	August 27, 1951	November 14, 1958
10	East 105th	February 1, 1948	June 14, 1963
24	Fulton	June 22, 1950	November 14, 1958
14	Kinsman	September 6, 1950	October 19, 1962
22	Lorain	June 15, 1952	November 14, 1958
38	Payne–Hough	March 1, 1939	April 12, 1963
1	St. Clair	November 4, 1951	May 4, 1962
3	Superior	March 22, 1953	April 12, 1963
15	Union	May 1, 1948	June 14, 1963
4	Wade Park	December 16, 1945	April 12, 1963
12	Woodland	February 16, 1949	October 19, 1962

== See also ==
- Greater Cleveland Regional Transit Authority
- Transportation in Cleveland
- Cleveland railroad history
- Northern Ohio Railway Museum
- G. C. Kuhlman Car Company — manufacturer based in Cleveland 1870–1932
- List of streetcar systems in the United States (all-time list)
