= Akron, Bedford and Cleveland Railroad =

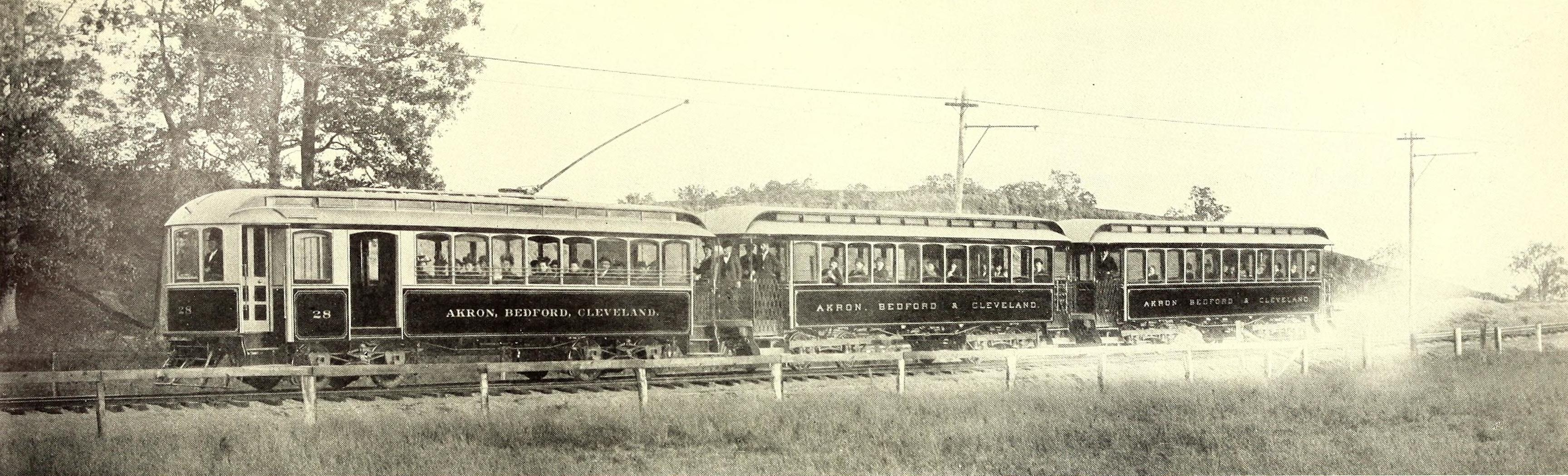
Akron, Bedford and Cleveland Railroad train, 1909

The Akron, Bedford and Cleveland Railroad (also known as the ABC or the Alphabet Railroad) began service between Akron and Cleveland, Ohio, on November 18, 1895. At the time, it was the longest electrified rail line in the world. For 50 cents riders could travel from Akron to Cleveland's Public Square in about 2½ hours. The line ran from Akron through the towns of Stow, Cuyahoga Falls, Hudson, Brandywine, Macedonia, Northfield, Bedford, Warrensville Heights, and Shaker Heights before dropping passengers at Cleveland Union Depot. Around 1900 the ABC Railroad merged with several other area railroads to form the Northern Ohio Traction and Light Company (NOT&LCo), which operated the line until 1932.

== Remaining traces ==
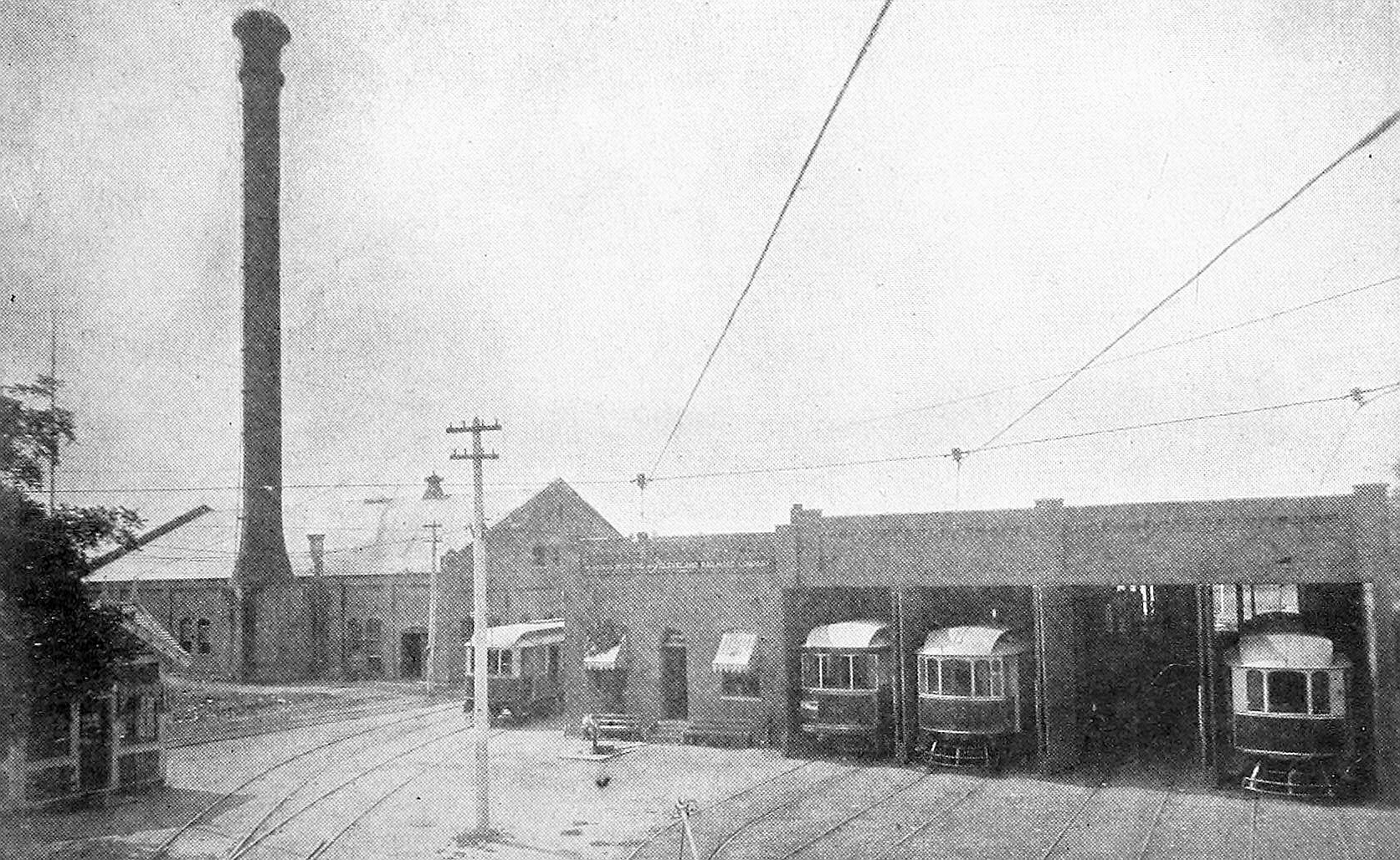
1899 view of Akron, Bedford and Cleveland Railroad shops at Cuyahoga Falls

While the railroad has been gone for almost 80 years and has been widely forgotten, there is still plenty of evidence of its former existence. At the intersection of Route 82 and Route 8 in Macedonia Ohio, a brick building stands at the corner. This was once the Macedonia depot that served the area. This station was constructed in 1905 by the Northern Ohio Traction and Light Company which later became Ohio Edison and is known today as FirstEnergy. It was put into service in 1912 after the completion of the double track through Macedonia. FirstEnergy still owns the building. The double tracks ran alongside the building almost exactly where the southbound lanes of Route 8 sit today. The original single-track line ran through Northfield center from Fells Corner (intersection of Olde 8 and Route 82) to Chittenden's Corner (intersection of Olde 8 and 303) and its use was discontinued in 1916. This portion of the former line is traced by Olde Eight road. The northern portion of the line can be traced by following Broadway Avenue from Bedford into Cleveland. Most of the former line is buried beneath Route 8, Northfield Road, Hudson Drive, or Broadway Road. As mentioned above, a large part of the original line ran through the town of Northfield Center. In 1916 the railroad stopped usage of the old route 8 rail line completely. The tracks were removed and old Route 8 became the modern road. At the intersection of Olde Eight Road and 303 are the remains of the bridge abutments that allowed the ABC RR to pass over the Lake Erie & Pittsburg Railway / New York Central Line that ran through Sagamore Hills at the time. Other portions of the right of way have been turned into bike and hike trails or are used as access roads for utility companies.

== Heritage ==
The line laid out the foundation of future transportation and helped to define the area as it is today. The line's path is clearly visible in satellite photos, and is marked by paved roads, modern rail lines, historic buildings, overgrown paths, and old stone abutments.

== See also ==
- List of Ohio railroads
- Streetcars in Cleveland
