= Northern Ohio Traction and Light =

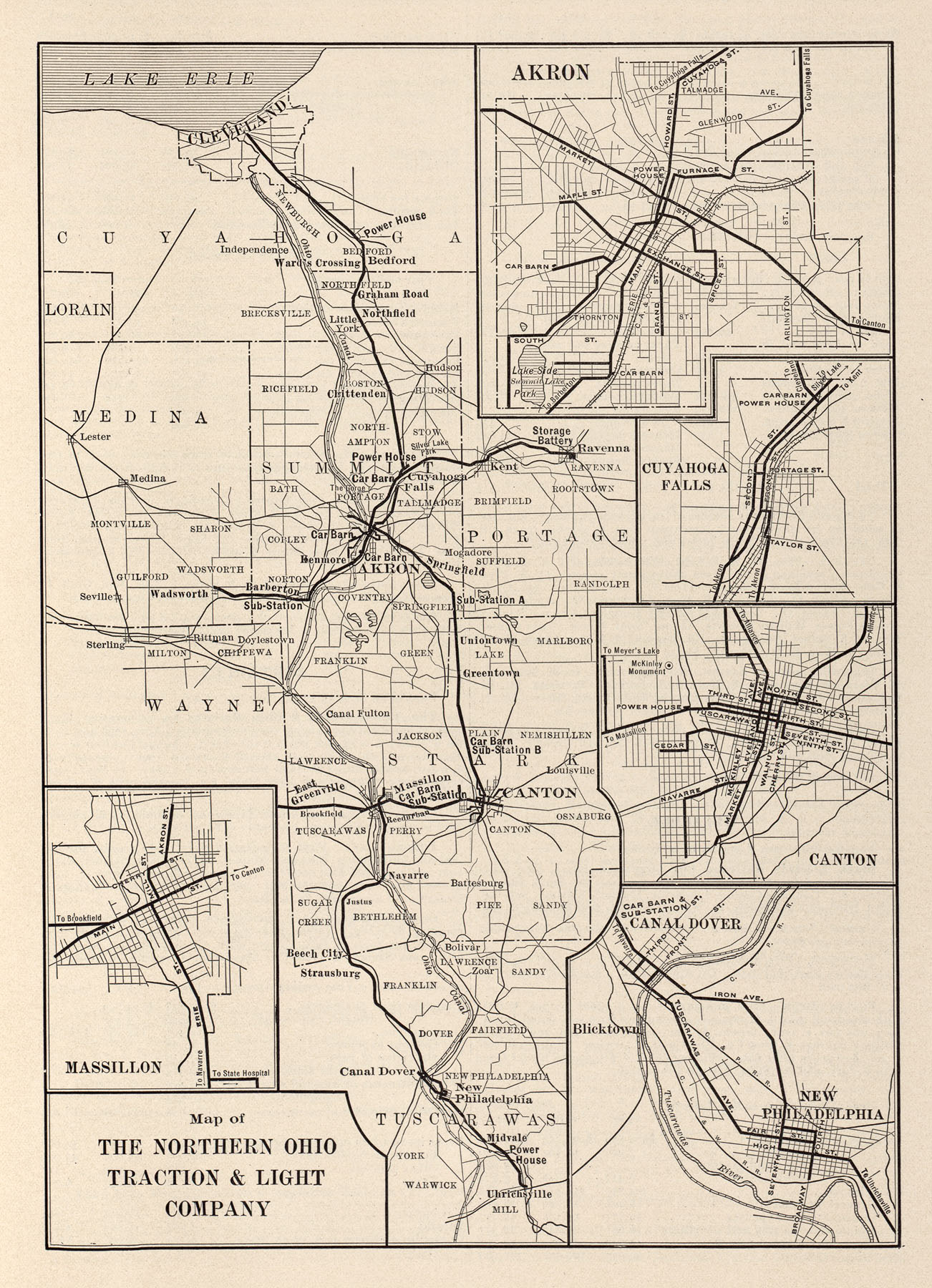
Map of the Northern Ohio Traction & Light Company

Northern Ohio Traction and Light was an American operator of electric interurban rail lines in Ohio. It also provided power for streetlights to Dover, Ohio and Akron, Ohio. It purchased train cars from G. C. Kuhlman Car Co.

== History ==
The Akron, Bedford and Cleveland Railroad merged with several other area railroads to form the Northern Ohio Traction & Light Company around 1900. It operated several rail lines and served Cleveland, Canton, Akron, Massillon, Dover, New Philadelphia, Uhrichsville, Wadsworth, East Greenville, Kent, Ravenna, Alliance and Warren. The company purchased the Canton and Massillon Electric Railway in 1902.

The Ohio Supreme Court adjudicated on a suit by a county to terminate the company's franchise in a dispute over passenger fees in 1918.

In 1926 the operation was renamed the Northern Ohio Power & Light Company. It consolidated with Ohio Edison around 1930 and its rail lines were discontinued by 1932.
