= Cleveland Electric Company =

Specialty contractor

Cleveland Electric Company, Inc.
- Type: Private
- Industry: Specialty Contractor
- Founded: 1925
- Founder: Ras Cleveland
- Headquarters: 33°47′18.91″N 84°29′59.15″W, Atlanta, Georgia, United States
- Area served: Southeast United States
- Key people: John Cleveland, President; Vann Cleveland, Director
- Revenue: $136.64 million
- Number of employees: 700
- Website: http://www.clevelandelectric.com/

Cleveland Electric Company, Inc. is a privately owned specialty contractor located in Atlanta, Georgia, United States, that serves Power Generation, Mission Critical, Healthcare and Industrial customers. In 2012, it is the 6th ranked specialty contractor in Southeast United States, serving regional revenues in 2011 of $136.64 million. The company is a member of The Electric Roundtable, an organization of electrical contractors whose goal is "To exchange best practices in every facet of electrical construction, design, maintenance, engineering, and internal operations."

== History ==
Cleveland Electric was founded in Atlanta, Georgia in 1925 by Ras Cleveland and specialized in electric motor repair. Over time, the company expanded into electric apparatus repair, sales and service. Its motor business grew and eventually produced about $30 million in revenue. The original location of the business resided in downtown Atlanta near the Georgia Tech Campus. The location was later sold to the Coca-Cola Company and the site now houses their World Headquarters Campus.

After World War II, Cleveland Electric began electrical construction work. In 1959 Ras Cleveland's two sons, Louie Cleveland Sr. and James Cleveland Sr. took over the business. Louie managed repairs and James managed construction.

In 1962 Cleveland Electric started a mechanical construction department and purchased an instrumentation company. The motor repair portion of the business was sold in 1998. Growing construction in the South allowed the company to expand and grow into its current target areas.

As of 2014, Vann Cleveland is Director; John Cleveland is president.

== Headquarters ==
Cleveland Electric operates from its headquarters complex in NorthWest Atlanta.

== Areas served ==
Cleveland Electric provides contractor services in the following areas:

- Electrical (88%)
- Mechanical (12%)
- Datacom

== Projects ==
Cleveland Electric has performed projects in the following areas for the customers listed (partial list):

- Industrial / Power Generation / Water Treatment
  - Alabama Power
  - Anheuser Busch
  - Chattahoochie WTP
  - F Wayne Hill WTP
  - Georgia Power
  - Georgia Tech
  - TVA
- Healthcare
  - Athens Regional Medical Center
  - Cartersville Medical Center
  - CDC
  - Dekalb Medical Center
  - Emory University
  - Georgia Department of Health
  - Georgia State University
  - Georgia Tech
  - Piedmont Fayette Hospital
- Mission Critical
  - AT&T
  - CNN
  - Earthlink
  - Georgia Power
  - Hewlett-Packard
  - Publix
  - Sprint
  - Suntrust
- Transit
  - CONRAC
  - MARTA
- Institutional / Commercial
  - Anheuser Busch
  - Atlanta Falcons
  - CDC
  - Coca-Cola
  - CONRAC
  - Emory University
  - ESPN
  - Federal Reserve Bank
  - Georgia Tech
  - High Museum of Art
  - The Lovett School
  - Milton High School
  - Morris Brown College
  - Southern Polytechnical Institute
  - Westin Hotel
  - University of Georgia

== Honors and awards ==
In 2012, Cleveland Electric was ranked 6th among specialty contractors in Southeast United States. The company is regularly ranked in the top 100 contractors in the United States.
