= Quercus utilis =

Conservation status
- Endangered (IUCN 3.1)

Scientific classification
- Kingdom: Plantae
- Clade: Embryophytes
- Clade: Tracheophytes
- Clade: Spermatophytes
- Clade: Angiosperms
- Clade: Eudicots
- Clade: Rosids
- Order: Fagales
- Family: Fagaceae
- Genus: Quercus
- Subgenus: Quercus subg. Cerris
- Section: Quercus sect. Ilex
- Species: Q. utilis

Binomial name
- Quercus utilis Hu & W.C.Cheng

Species of flowering plant

'Quercus utilis is a species of oak. It is a tree native to Guangxi, Guizhou, and Yunnan in southern China. It is known from six locations in open to dense subtropical moist forest on rocky hills from 1,000 to 1,500 metres elevation.

The species was described by Hsen Hsu Hu and Wan Chun Cheng in 1951.
