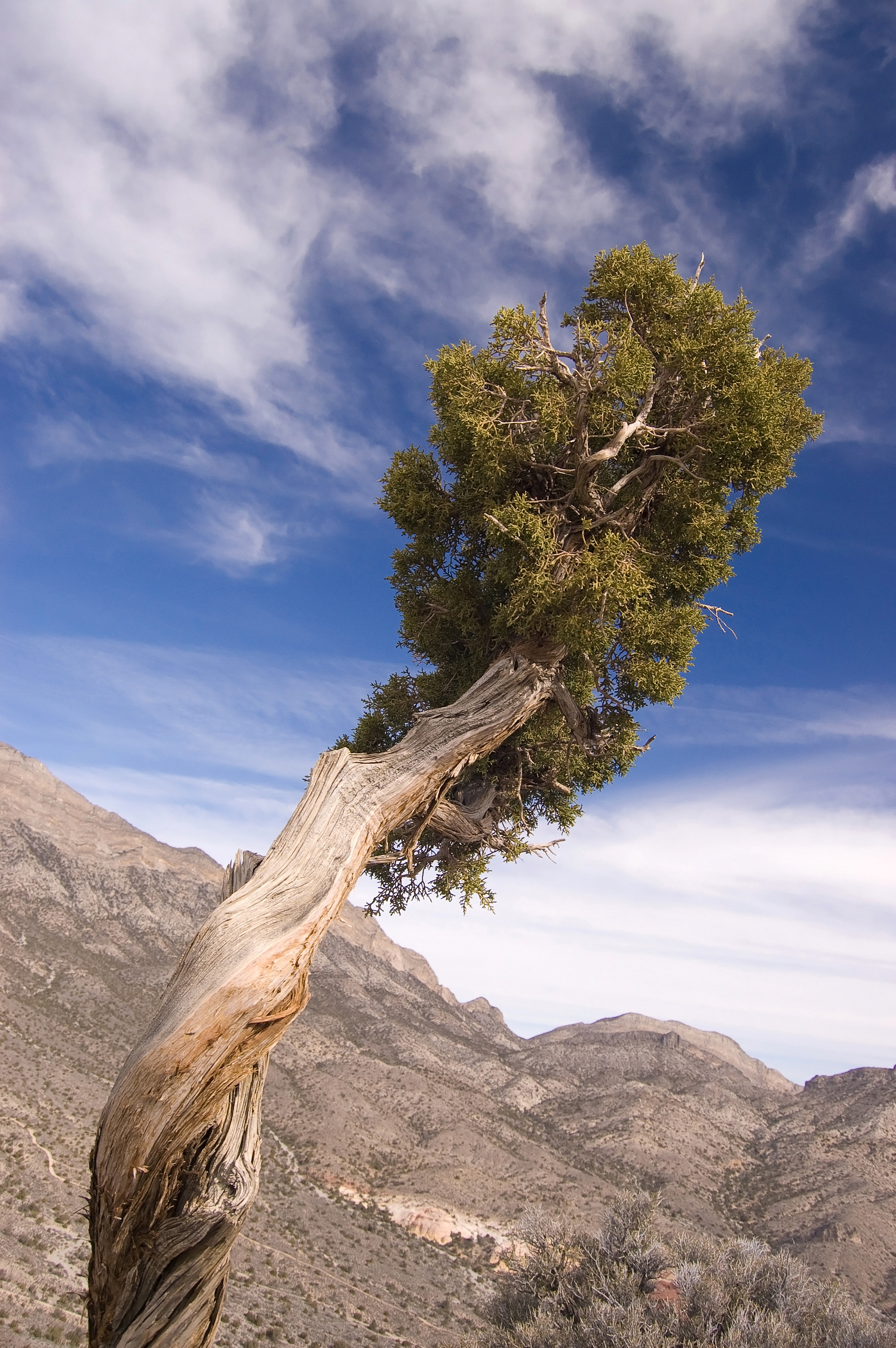
- Utah juniper (Juniperus osteosperma) in Nevada

Scientific classification
- Kingdom: Plantae
- Clade: Tracheophytes
- Clade: Gymnosperms
- Division: Pinophyta
- Class: Pinopsida
- Order: Cupressales
- Family: Cupressaceae
- Subfamily: Cupressoideae
- Genus: Juniperus; L.

Type species
- Juniperus communis L.

Species
- 72; see text.

Synonyms
- Arceuthos Antoine & Kotschy; Oxycedrus Carrière; Sabina Miller; Sabinella Nakai; Thujiaecarpus von Trautvetter

= Juniper =

Juniper Temporal range: Turonian-Holocene 93.9–0 Ma

Genus of plants

Junipers are coniferous trees and shrubs in the genus Juniperus of the cypress family Cupressaceae. Depending on the taxonomic authority, between 50 and 67 species of junipers are widely distributed throughout the Northern Hemisphere. The highest-known juniper forest occurs at an altitude of 4,900 metres (16,100 ft) in southeastern Tibet and the northern Himalayas, creating one of the highest tree lines on earth.

== Description ==
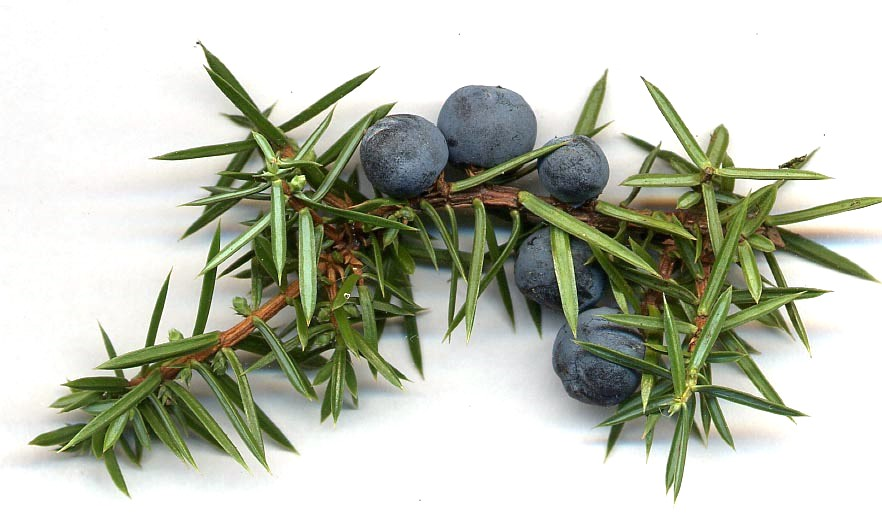
Cones and leaves of Juniperus communis

Junipers vary in size and shape from tall trees, 20–40 metres (66–131 feet) tall, to columnar or low-spreading shrubs with long, trailing branches. They are coniferous with needle-like and/or scale-like leaves. They can be either monoecious or dioecious. The female seed cones are very distinctive, with fleshy, fruit-like coalescing scales which fuse together to form a berrylike structure (galbulus), 4–27 millimetres (3/16–1 1/16 inches) long, with one to 12 unwinged, hard-shelled seeds. In some species, these "berries" are red-brown or orange, but in most, they are blue; they are often aromatic and can be used as a spice, most famously in gin. The seed maturation time varies between species from 6 to 18 months after pollination. The male cones are similar to the other Cupressaceae, with 6 to 20 scales.

In hardiness zones 7 through 10, junipers can bloom and release pollen several times each year. Different junipers bloom in autumn, while most pollinate from early winter until late spring.

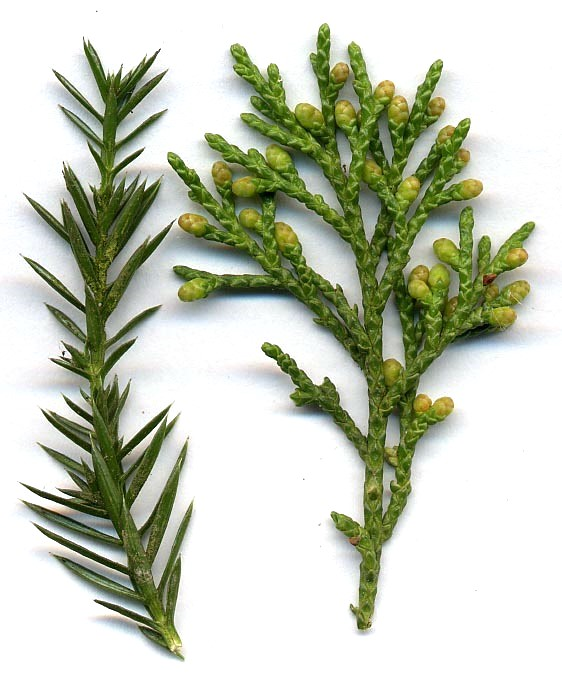
Detail of Juniperus chinensis shoots, with juvenile needle-like leaves (left), adult scale leaves (right), with immature male cones

Many junipers (e.g., J. chinensis, J. virginiana) have two types of leaves; seedlings and some stressed twigs of older trees have needle-like leaves 5–25 mm (3/16–1 in) long, on mature plants the leaves are overlapping like (mostly) tiny scales, measuring 2–4 mm (3/32–5/32 in). When juvenile foliage occurs on mature plants, it is most often found on shaded shoots, with adult foliage in full sunlight. Leaves on fast-growing 'whip' shoots are often intermediate between juvenile and adult.

In some species (e.g., J. communis, J. squamata), all the foliage is of the juvenile needle-like type, with no scale leaves. In some of these (e.g., J. communis), the needles are jointed at the base, while in others (e.g., J. squamata), the needles merge smoothly with the stem. The needle leaves of junipers are hard and sharp, making the juvenile foliage very prickly to handle. This can be a valuable identification feature in seedlings, as the otherwise very similar juvenile foliage of cypresses (Cupressus, Chamaecyparis) and other related genera are soft and not prickly.

Junipers are gymnosperms, which means they have seeds, but no flowers or fruits. Depending on the species, the seeds they produce take 1–3 years to develop. The impermeable coat of the seed keeps water from getting in and protects the embryo when dispersed. It can also result in a long dormancy that is usually broken by physically damaging the seed coat. Dispersal can occur from being swallowed whole by frugivores and mammals. The resistance of the seed coat allows it to be passed down through the digestive system without being destroyed along the way. These seeds last a long time, as they can be dispersed long distances over the course of a few years.

== Classification ==
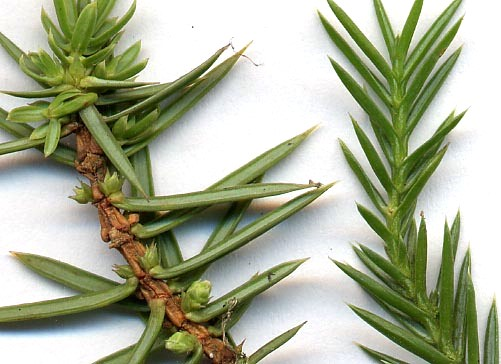
Juniper needles, magnified. Left, J. communis (Juniperus sect. Juniperus, needles 'jointed' at base). Right, J. chinensis (Juniperus sect. Sabina, needles merging smoothly with the stem, not jointed at base)

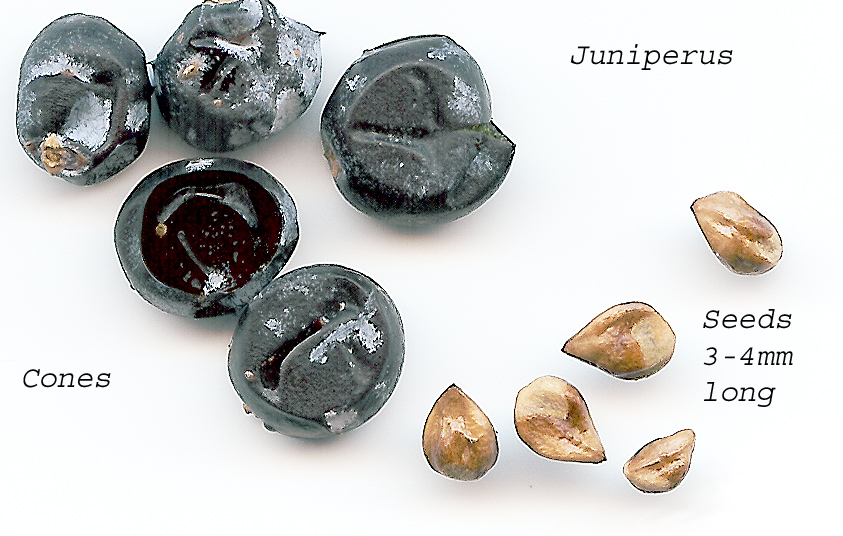
Cones and seeds

=== Sections ===
The genus has been divided into sections in somewhat different ways. A system based on molecular phylogenetic data from 2013 and earlier used three sections:

- Section Caryocedrus – 1 species with large, blue, woody, 3-seeded cones; native to the Mediterranean
- Section Juniperus – 14 species with blue or red seed cones, often with 3 seeds; 12 species native to the Eastern Hemisphere, one endemic to North America, and one species, J. communis, circumboreal
- Section Sabina – about 60 species with variously coloured seed cones with 1 to 13 seeds; species about equally divided between the eastern and western hemispheres Juniperus sect. Sabina was further divided into clades.

A new classification of gymnosperms published in 2022 recognised the sections as three separate genera: Arceuthos for section Caryocedrus, Sabina for section Sabina, and Juniperus sensu stricto for section Juniperus.

=== Species ===
Phylogeny of Juniperus

- - - section Caryocedrus
      J. drupacea de Labillardière
    - section Juniperus
      - - J. cedrus Webb & Berthelot 1848
        - J. oxycedrus von Linné
      - - J. rigida von Siebold & Zuccarini
        - - - J. formosana Hayata
            - J. deltoides Adams
          - - J. taxifolia Hooker & Arn.
            - J. communis von Linné
  - - section Sabina
      - - - J. flaccida von Schlechtendal
          - - J. standleyi Steyermark
            - J. monticola Martínez
        - - - J. osteosperma (Torrey) Little
            - J. occidentalis Hooker
          - - - J. gamboana Martínez
              - J. deppeana Steud.
            - - - J. ashei Buchholz
                - - J. californica Carrière
                  - - J. saltillensis Hall
                    - J. durangensis Martínez
              - - J. monosperma (Engelmann) Sarg.
                - - J. coahuilensis (Martínez) Gaussen ex Adams
                  - - J. pinchotii Sudworth
                    - - J. angosturana Adams
                      - J. comitana Martínez
      - - - J. pseudosabina Fisch. & von Meyer
          - - J. tibetica Kom.
            - - - J. pingii Cheng ex Cheng
                - - J. przewalskii Kom.
                  - J. saltuaria saltuaria Rehder & Wilson
              - - J. convallium Rehder & Wilson
                - - J. indica Bertoloni
                  - - - J. coxii Jackson
                      - J. recurva Buchanan-Hamilton ex Don
                    - - J. komarovii Florin
                      - J. squamata Buchanan-Hamilton ex Don
        - - - J. phoenicea von Linné
            - - J. procera Hochst. ex Endlicher
              - - - J. excelsa M. Bieb.
                  - J. polycarpos Koch
                - - J. thurifera von Linné
                  - - J. procumbens (von Siebold ex Endlicher) Miquel
                    - - J. gaussenii Cheng
                      - J. chinensis von Linné
          - - J. microsperma (Cheng & Fu) Adams
            - - J. blancoi Martínez
              - - J. horizontalis Moench
                - - - J. semiglobosa Regel
                    - J. sabina von Linné
                  - - - J. bermudiana von Linné
                      - J. gracilior Pilger
                    - - J. saxicola Britton & Wilson
                      - - J. virginiana von Linné
                        - - J. scopulorum Sarg.
                          - J. barbadensis von Linné

==== Juniperus sect. Caryocedrus ====
Cones with three seeds fused together; needles with two stomatal bands. One species:

- Juniperus drupacea – Syrian juniper

==== Juniperus sect. Juniperus ====
Needle-leaf junipers; the adult leaves are needle-like, in whorls of three, and jointed at the base. Species:

- Juniperus sect. Juniperus subsect. Juniperus – cones with three separate seeds; needles with one stomatal band
  - Juniperus communis – common juniper
    - Juniperus communis subsp. alpina – alpine juniper
  - Juniperus conferta, syn. Juniperus rigida var. conferta (Parl.) Patschke – shore juniper
  - Juniperus rigida – Temple juniper or needle juniper
- Juniperus sect. Juniperus subsect. Oxycedrus – cones with three separate seeds; needles with two stomatal bands
  - Juniperus brevifolia – Azores juniper
  - Juniperus cedrus – Canary Islands juniper
  - Juniperus formosana – Chinese prickly juniper
  - Juniperus lutchuensis, syn. Juniperus taxifolia var. lutchuensis (Koidz.) Satake – Ryukyu juniper
  - Juniperus oxycedrus – Western prickly juniper, cade juniper
  - Juniperus macrocarpa – large-berry juniper

==== Juniperus sect. Sabina ====
Scale-leaf junipers; adult leaves are mostly scale-like, similar to those of Cupressus species, in opposite pairs or whorls of three, and the juvenile needle-like leaves are not jointed at the base (including in the few that have only needle-like leaves; see below right).

===== Old World species =====
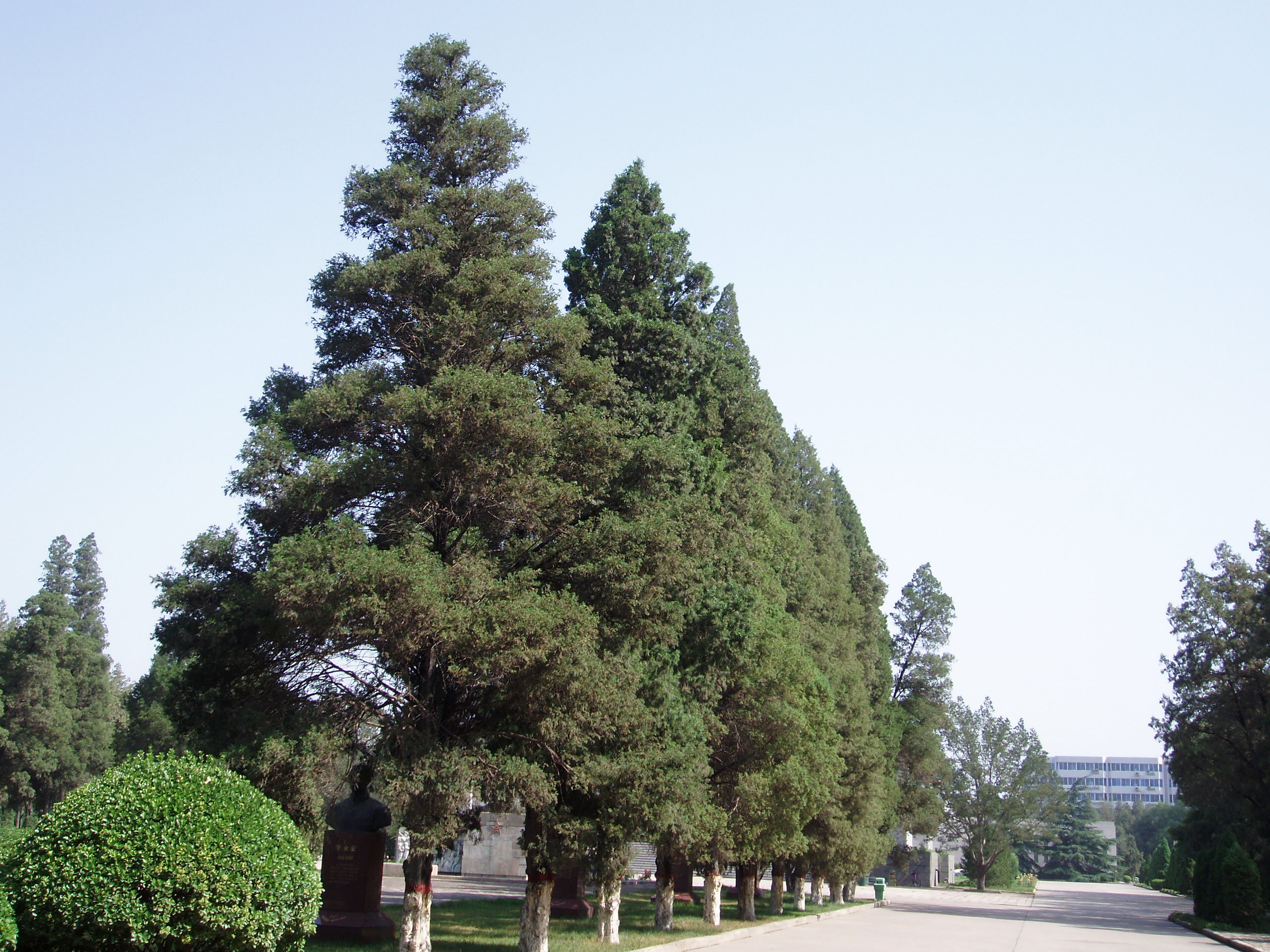
Avenue of Juniperus chinensis

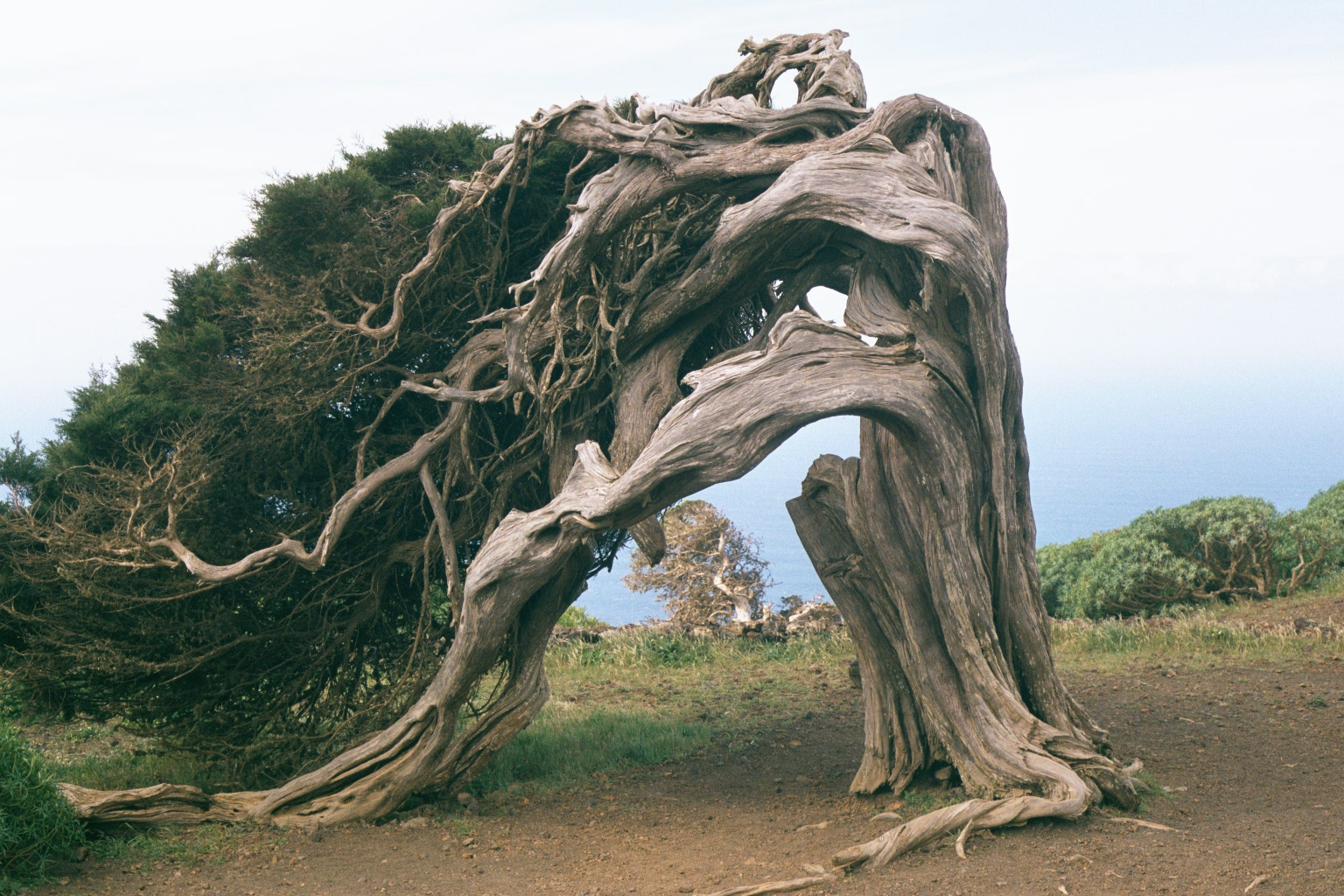
Juniperus phoenicea on El Hierro, Canary Islands

- Juniperus chinensis – Chinese juniper
- Juniperus convallium – Mekong juniper
- Juniperus excelsa – Greek juniper
- Juniperus foetidissima – stinking juniper
- Juniperus indica – Himalayan black juniper
- Juniperus komarovii – Komarov's juniper
- Juniperus phoenicea – Phoenicean juniper
- Juniperus pingii – Ping juniper
- Juniperus procera – East African juniper
- Juniperus procumbens – Ibuki juniper
- Juniperus pseudosabina – Xinjiang juniper
- Juniperus recurva – Himalayan juniper
- Juniperus sabina – Savin juniper
- Juniperus saltuaria – Sichuan juniper
- Juniperus semiglobosa – Himalayan pencil juniper
- Juniperus seravschanica – Pashtun juniper
- Juniperus squamata – flaky juniper
- Juniperus thurifera – Spanish juniper
- Juniperus tibetica – Tibetan juniper

===== New World species =====
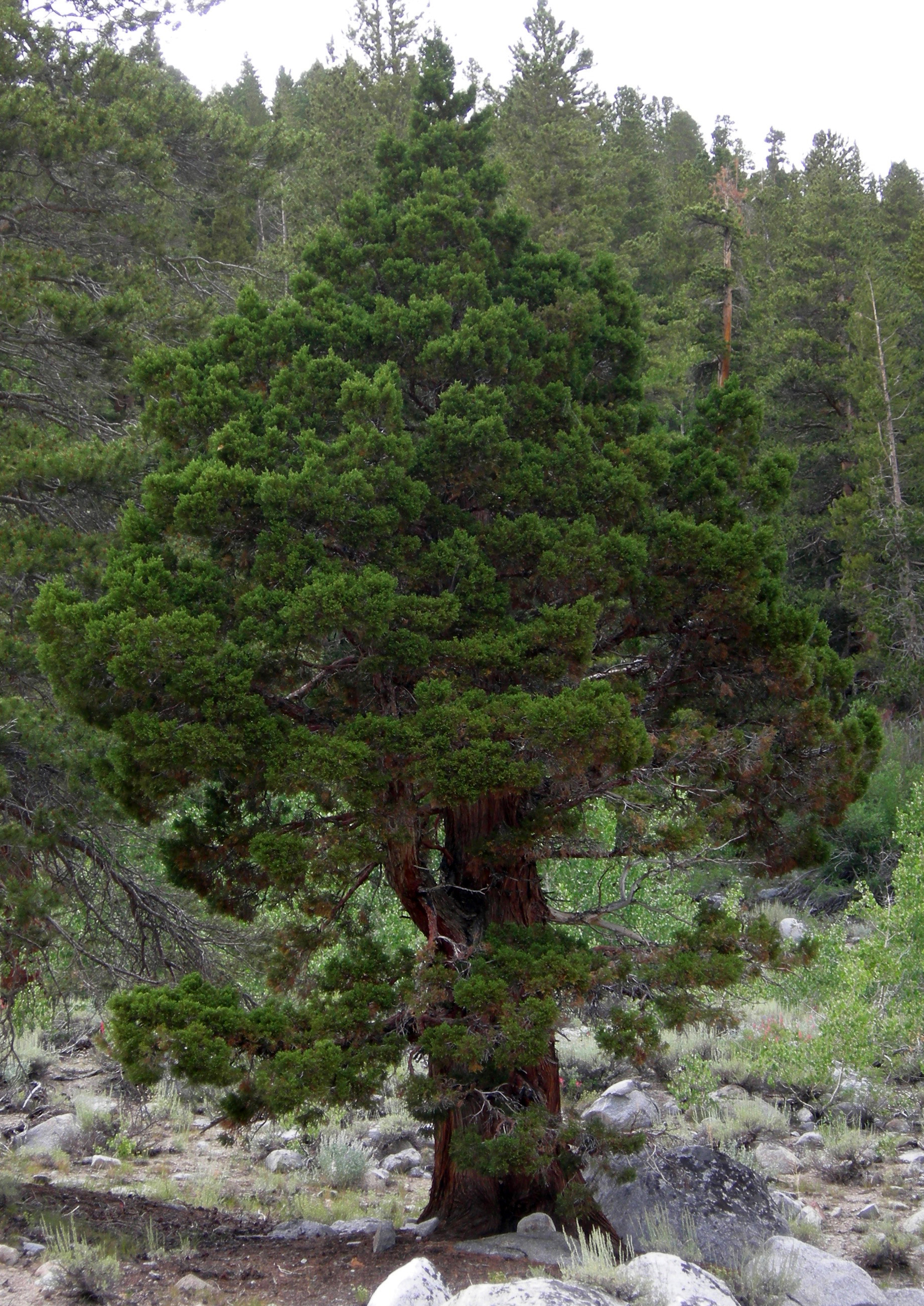
Juniperus grandis in the eastern Sierra Nevada, Rock Creek Canyon, California

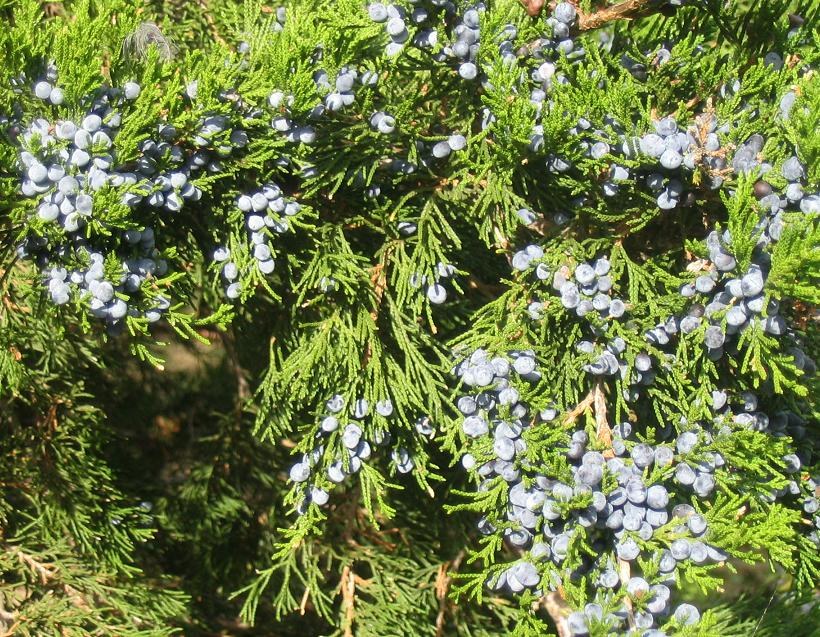
Juniperus virginiana in October laden with ripe cones

- Juniperus angosturana – Mexican one-seed juniper
- Juniperus ashei – Ashe juniper
- Juniperus arizonica – redberry juniper, roseberry juniper
- Juniperus barbadensis – West Indies juniper
- Juniperus bermudiana – Bermuda juniper
- Juniperus blancoi – Blanco's juniper
- Juniperus californica – California juniper
- Juniperus coahuilensis – Coahuila juniper
- Juniperus comitana – Comitán juniper
- Juniperus deppeana – alligator juniper
- Juniperus durangensis – Durango juniper
- Juniperus flaccida – Mexican weeping juniper
- Juniperus gamboana – Gamboa juniper
- Juniperus grandis – Sierra juniper
- Juniperus horizontalis – creeping juniper
- Juniperus jaliscana – Jalisco juniper
- Juniperus maritima, syn. Juniperus scopulorum – seaside juniper
- Juniperus monosperma – one-seed juniper
- Juniperus monticola – mountain juniper
- Juniperus occidentalis – western juniper
- Juniperus osteosperma – Utah juniper
- Juniperus pinchotii – Pinchot juniper
- Juniperus saltillensis – Saltillo juniper
- Juniperus scopulorum – Rocky Mountain juniper
- Juniperus standleyi – Standley's juniper
- Juniperus virginiana – eastern juniper, eastern redcedar
  - Juniperus virginiana subsp. silicicola – Southern juniper
- Juniperus zanonii (proposed)

==== Additional species ====
As of April 2022, Plants of the World Online accepts the following additional species to those listed above:

- Juniperus canariensis Guyot & Mathou
- Juniperus coxii A.B.Jacks.
- Juniperus deltoides R.P.Adams
- Juniperus gracilior Pilg.
- Juniperus mairei Lemée & H.Lév.
- Juniperus morrisonicola Hayata
- Juniperus mucronata R.P.Adams
- Juniperus navicularis Gand.
- Juniperus poblana (Martínez) R.P.Adams
- Juniperus polycarpos K.Koch
- Juniperus przewalskii Kom.
- Juniperus saxicola Britton & P.Wilson
- Juniperus taxifolia Hook. & Arn.
- Juniperus tsukusiensis Masam.
- Juniperus turbinata Guss.

== Ecology ==
Juniper plants thrive in a variety of environments. The junipers from Lahaul valley can be found in dry, rocky locations planted in stony soils. Grazing animals and the villagers are rapidly using up these plants. There are several important features of the leaves and wood of this plant that cause villagers to cut down these trees and make use of them. Additionally, the western juniper plants, a particular species in the juniper genus, are found in woodlands where there are large, open spaces. Junipers are known to encompass open areas so that they have more exposure to rainfall. Decreases in fires and a lack of livestock grazing are the two major causes of western juniper takeover. This invasion of junipers is driving changes in the environment. For instance, the ecosystem for other species previously living in the environment and farm animals has been compromised. When junipers increase in population, there is a decrease in woody species like mountain big sagebrush and aspen. Among the juniper trees themselves, there is increased competition, which results in a decrease in berry production. Herbaceous cover decreases, and junipers are often mistaken for weeds. As a result, several farmers have thinned the juniper trees or removed them completely. However, this reduction did not result in any significant difference on wildlife survival. Some small mammals found it advantageous to have thinner juniper trees, while cutting down the entire tree was not favorable.

Some junipers are susceptible to Gymnosporangium rust disease and can be a serious problem for those people growing apple trees, an alternate host of the disease.

Juniper is the exclusive food plant of the larvae of some moths and butterflies, including Bucculatrix inusitata, juniper carpet, Chionodes electella, Chionodes viduella, juniper pug, and pine beauty. Those of the tortrix moth Cydia duplicana feed on the bark around injuries or canker.

== Cultivation ==
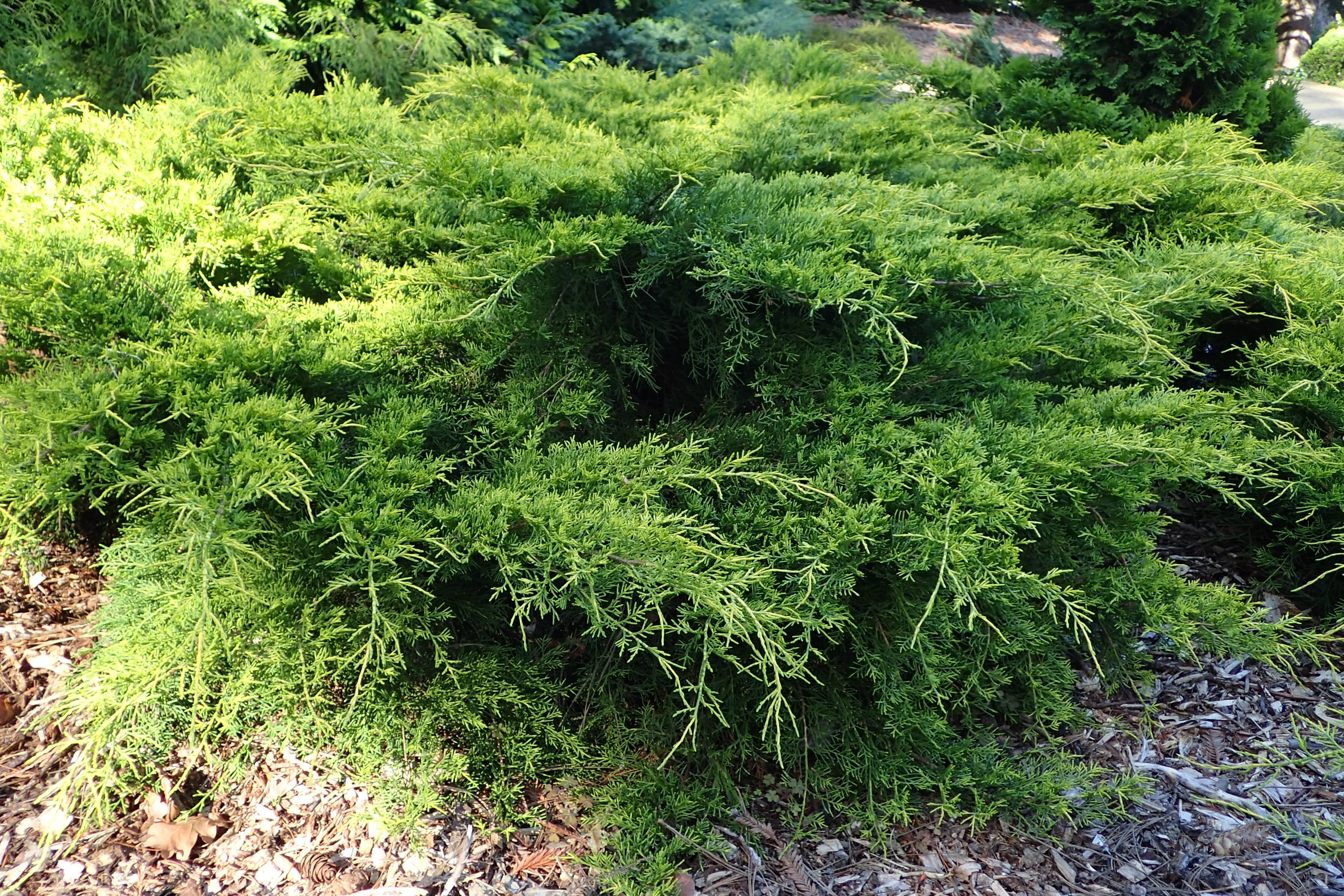
Juniperus × pfitzeriana 'Gold Coast'

Junipers are among the most popular conifers to be cultivated as ornamental subjects for parks and gardens. They have been bred over many years to produce a wide range of forms, in terms of colour, shape and size. They include some of the dwarfest (miniature) cultivars. They are also used for bonsai. Some species found in cultivation include:

- Juniperus chinensis
- Juniperus communis
- Juniperus horizontalis
- Juniperus × pfitzeriana
- Juniperus procumbens
- Juniperus rigida
- Juniperus scopulorum
- Juniperus squamata

== Toxicity ==
In drier areas, juniper pollen easily becomes airborne and can be inhaled into the lungs. This pollen can also irritate the skin and cause contact dermatitis. Cross-allergenic reactions are common between juniper pollen and the pollen of all species of cypress.

Monoecious juniper plants are highly allergenic, with an Ogren Plant Allergy Scale (OPALS) rating of 9 out of 10. Completely male juniper plants have an OPALS rating of 10, and release abundant amounts of pollen. Conversely, all-female juniper plants, totally lacking pollen, have an OPALS rating of 1, and are considered "allergy-fighting".

== Uses ==
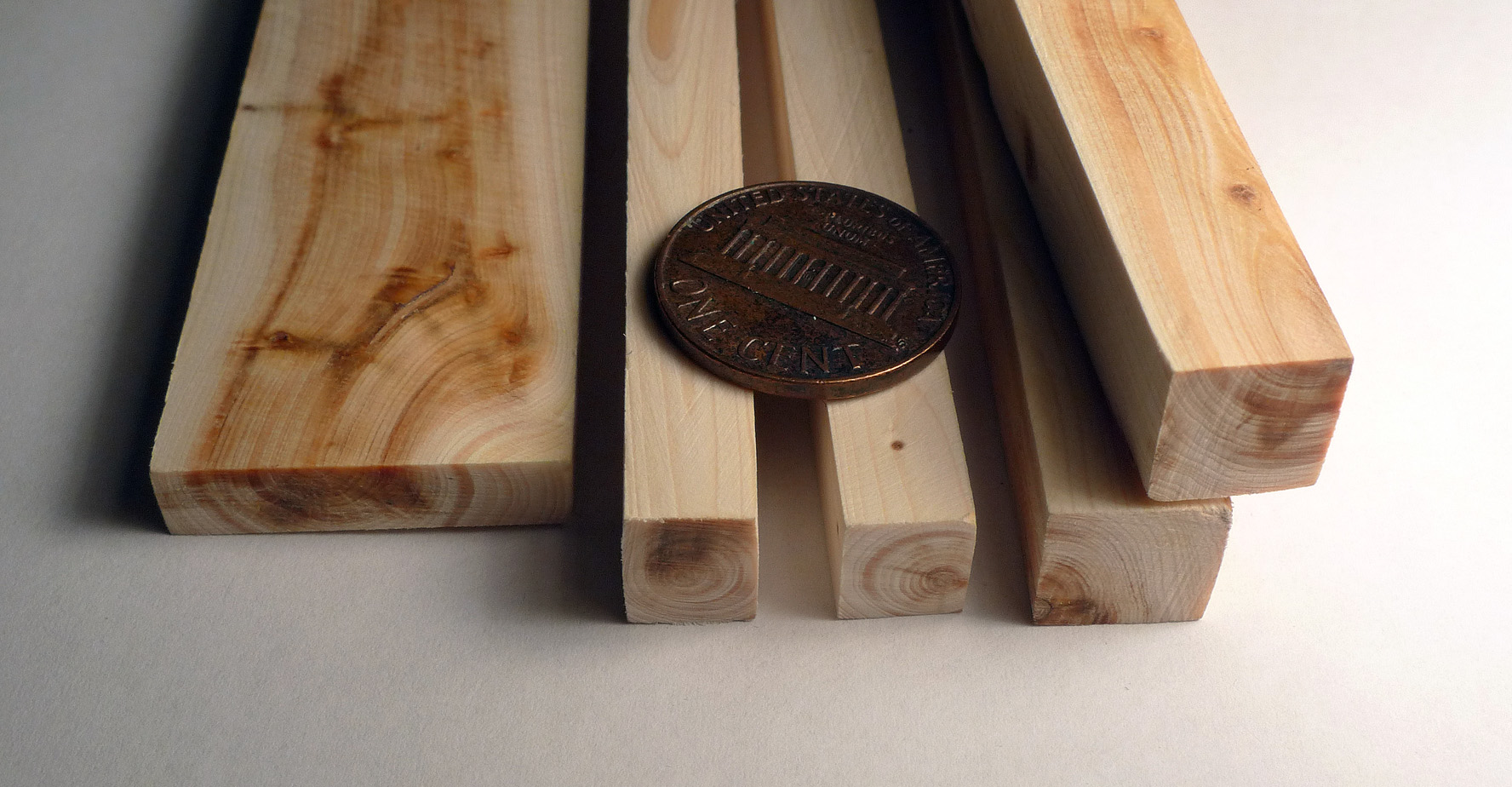
Juniperus communis wood pieces, with a U.S. penny for scale, showing the narrow growth rings of the species

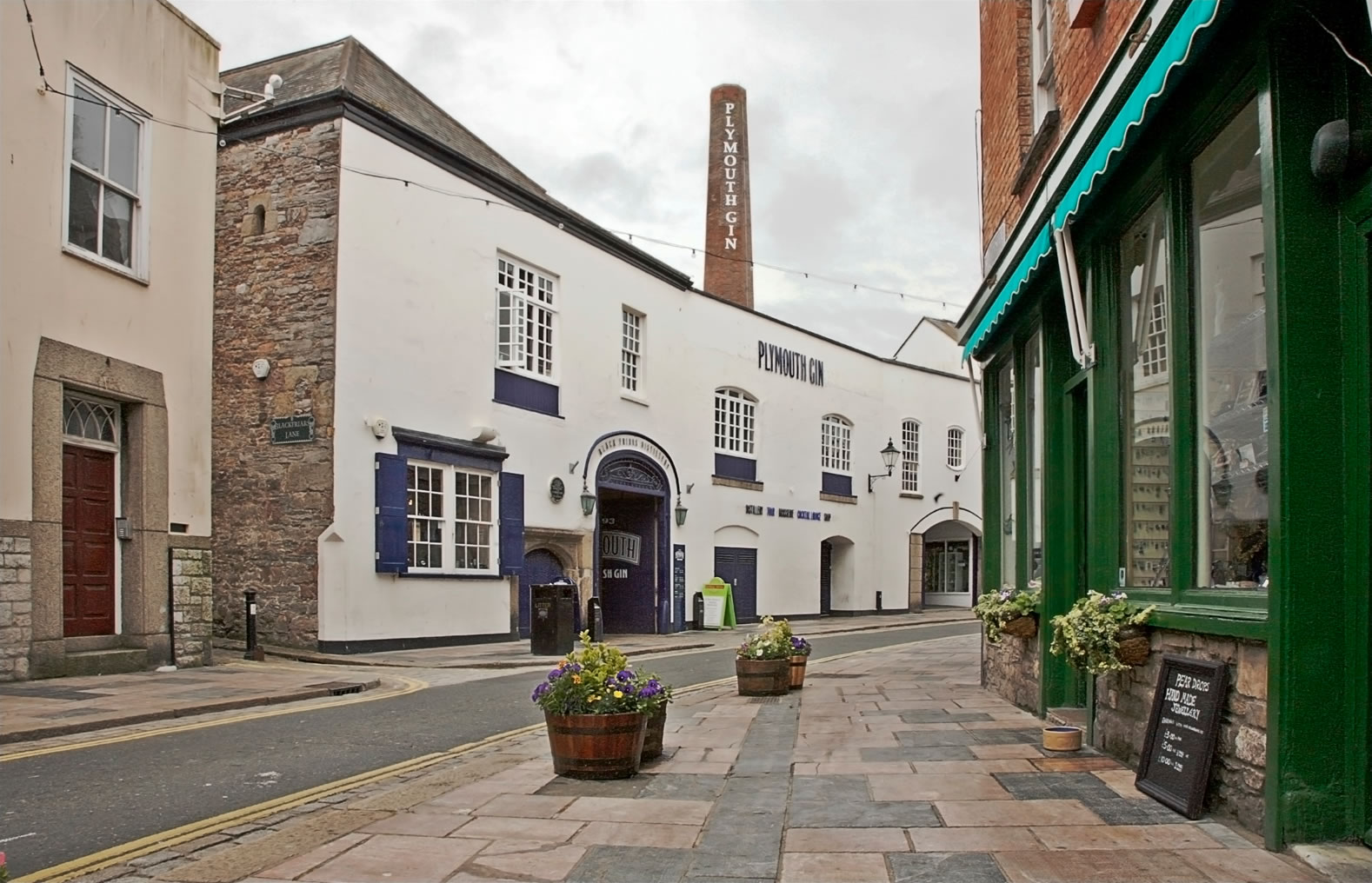
Plymouth Gin factory, England

=== Ethnic and herbal use ===
Most species of juniper are flexible and have a high compression strength-to-weight ratio. This has made the wood a traditional choice for the construction of hunting bows among some of the Native American cultures in the Great Basin region. These bow staves are typically backed with sinew to provide tension strength that the wood may lack.

Ancient Mesopotamians believed that juniper oil could be used to ward off the evil eye.

Embalming vessels in the burial chambers from a 26th Dynasty embalming workshop at Saqqara have shown the usage of Juniper oil/tar.

Some Indigenous peoples of the Americas use juniper in traditional medicine; for instance the Dineh (Navajo), who use it for diabetes. Juniper ash has also been historically consumed as a source of calcium by the Navajo people.

Juniper is traditionally used in Scottish folkloric and Gaelic Polytheist saining rites, such as those performed at Hogmanay (New Year), where the smoke of burning juniper, accompanied by traditional prayers and other customary rites, is used to cleanse, bless, and protect the household and its inhabitants.

Local people in Lahaul Valley, north India, present juniper leaves to their deities as a folk tradition. It is also useful as a folk remedy for pains and aches, as well as epilepsy and asthma. They are reported to collect large amounts of juniper leaves and wood for building and religious purposes.

=== General use ===
Juniper berries are a spice used in a wide variety of culinary dishes and are best known for the primary flavoring in gin(and responsible for gin's name, which is a shortening of the Dutch word for juniper, jenever). A juniper-based spirit is made by fermenting juniper berries and water to create a "wine" that is then distilled. This is often sold as a juniper brandy in eastern Europe. Juniper berries are also used as the primary flavor in the liquor jenever. Juniper berry sauce is often a popular flavoring choice for quail, pheasant, veal, rabbit, venison, and other game dishes.

A tea can be made from the young twigs. Twigs or needles are used to flavour the traditional Finnish junperbeer, sahti as well.

Dense and rot resistant, the irregular trunks of junipers have been used as fence posts and firewood. Stands that produce enough wood for specialty uses generally go under the common name "cedar", including Juniperus virginiana, the "red cedar" that is used widely in cedar drawers and closets. A hyphen or a lack of a space between the words "red" and "cedar" is sometimes used to indicate that this species is not a true cedar (Cedrus).

Juniper in weave is a traditional cladding technique used in Northern Europe, e.g., at Havrå, Norway.

Juniper berries are steam distilled to produce an essential oil that may vary from colorless to yellow or pale green. Some of its chemical components are terpenoids and aromatic compounds, such as cadinene, a sesquiterpene.
