= Juniperus przewalskii =

Conservation status
- Least Concern (IUCN 3.1)

Scientific classification
- Kingdom: Plantae
- Clade: Tracheophytes
- Clade: Gymnosperms
- Division: Pinophyta
- Class: Pinopsida
- Order: Cupressales
- Family: Cupressaceae
- Genus: Juniperus
- Species: J. przewalskii

Binomial name
- Juniperus przewalskii Kom.

Species of conifer

Juniperus przewalskii, or Przewalski's juniper, is a species of juniper native to the mountains of western China in Gansu, Qinghai, and northernmost Sichuan, growing at altitudes of 1,000-3,300 m.

It is an evergreen tree reaching 15–20 m tall. The leaves are of two forms, juvenile needle-like leaves 4–10 mm long, and adult scale-leaves 1.5–3 mm long on shoots 1.2-1.5 mm thick. Juvenile leaves are found mainly on seedlings but continue to be produced on scattered shoots on mature trees. It is monoecious with male (pollen) and female (seed) cones on the same plant. The seed cones are berry-like, 8–13 mm long and 9–10 mm diameter, blue-black with limited whitish waxy bloom, and contain one, rarely two seeds; they are mature in about 12 months. The male cones are 2–3 mm long, and shed their pollen in autumn.

Although not currently threatened, increased deforestation in the region may threaten it in the future.
