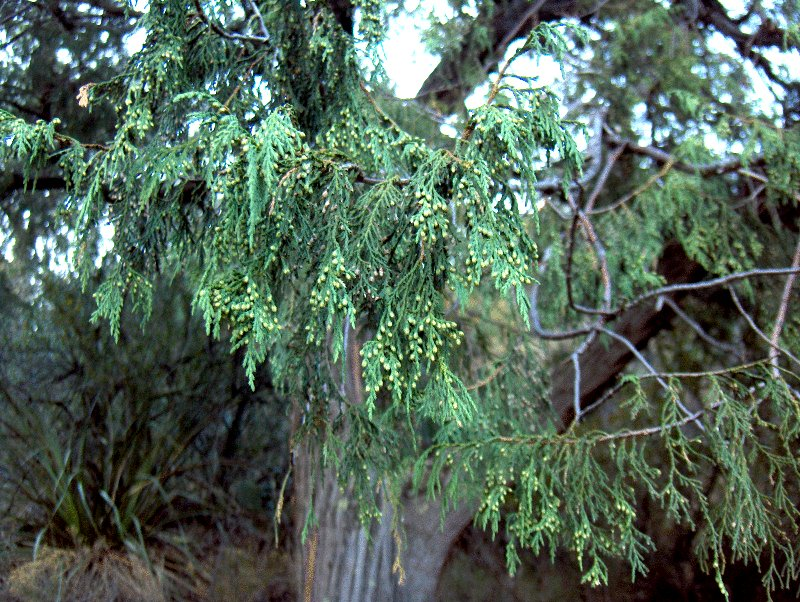
- J. flaccida in Big Bend National Park

Conservation status
- Least Concern (IUCN 3.1)

Scientific classification
- Kingdom: Plantae
- Clade: Tracheophytes
- Clade: Gymnospermae
- Division: Pinophyta
- Class: Pinopsida
- Order: Cupressales
- Family: Cupressaceae
- Genus: Juniperus
- Species: J. flaccida

Binomial name
- Juniperus flaccida Schltdl.
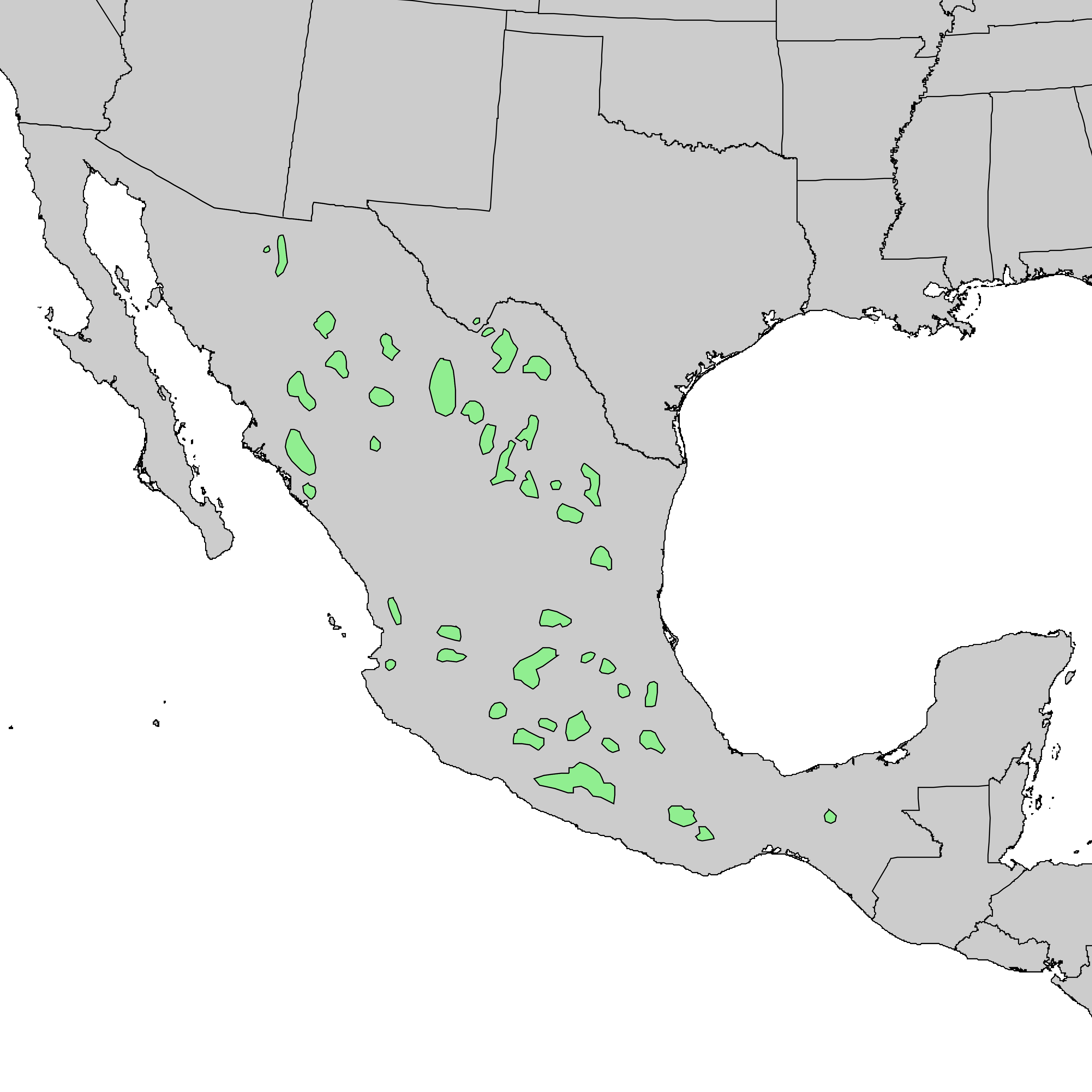
- Natural range of Juniperus flaccida

Synonyms
- Juniperus flaccida var. typica Martínez; Juniperus foetida var. flaccida (Schltdl.) Spach; Sabina flaccida (Schltdl.) Antoine

= Juniperus flaccida =

Species of conifer

Juniperus flaccida (known as drooping juniper, weeping juniper, Mexican juniper, or tláscal) is a large shrub or small tree reaching 5–10 metres (16–33 feet) (rarely to 15 m) tall. It is native to central and northern Mexico (from Oaxaca northward) and the extreme southwest of Texas, United States (Brewster County). It grows at moderate altitudes of 800–2,600 metres (2,600–8,500 feet), on dry soils.

The bark is brown, with stringy vertical fissuring. The shoots are strongly pendulous, 1–1.2 mm diameter, and often borne in flattened sprays (the only juniper commonly showing this character). The leaves are arranged in opposite decussate pairs; the adult leaves are scale-like, 2–4 mm long (to 7 mm on lead shoots) and 1–1.5 mm broad. The juvenile leaves (on young seedlings only) are needle-like, 5–10 mm long. The cones are berry-like, 8–20 mm in diameter, green maturing brown, and contain 6-12 seeds (the most seeds per cone of any juniper); they are mature in about 18 months. The male cones are 3–5 mm long, and shed their pollen in spring. It is largely dioecious, producing cones of only one sex on each tree.

There are three varieties, not accepted as distinct by all authorities:

- Juniperus flaccida var. flaccida. Throughout the range of the species. Cones 9–15 mm diameter, with inconspicuous scale margins.
- Juniperus flaccida var. martinezii. Restricted to a small area in Jalisco. Cones 6–8 mm diameter, with inconspicuous scale margins.
- Juniperus flaccida var. poblana. Throughout the southern two thirds of the range of the species. Cones 12–20 mm diameter, with conspicuous scale margins.
