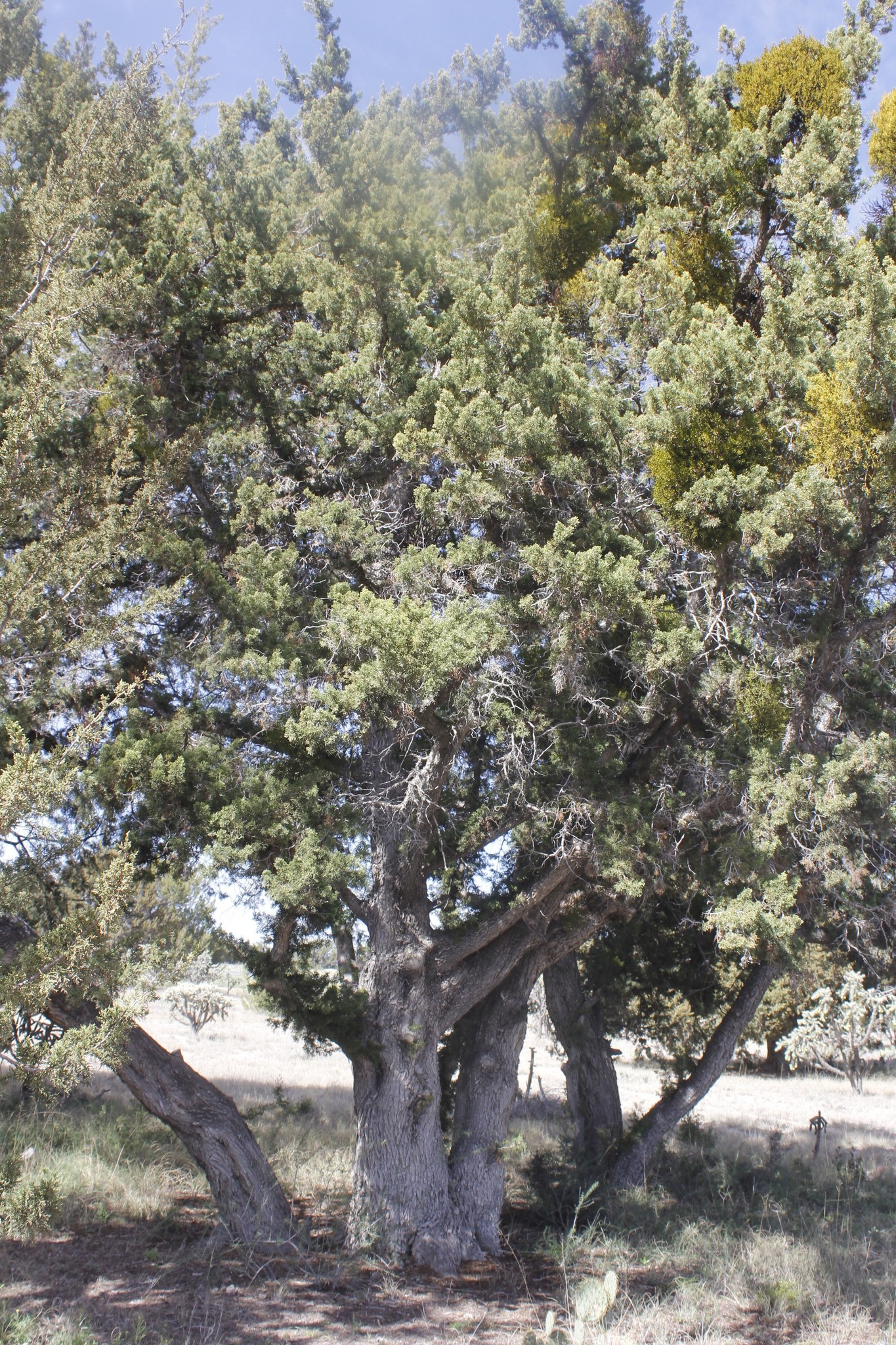

Conservation status
- Vulnerable (IUCN 3.1)

Scientific classification
- Kingdom: Plantae
- Clade: Tracheophytes
- Clade: Gymnospermae
- Division: Pinophyta
- Class: Pinopsida
- Order: Cupressales
- Family: Cupressaceae
- Genus: Juniperus
- Species: J. angosturana

Binomial name
- Juniperus angosturana R.P.Adams

= Juniperus angosturana =

Species of conifer

Juniperus angosturana, or slender oneseed juniper, is a species of conifer in the family Cupressaceae.

== Distribution ==
The tree is endemic to north-eastern Mexico. It is found in habitats of the Sierra Madre Oriental range, within the states of Coahuila, Hidalgo, Nuevo León, Queretaro, San Luis Potosí, and Tamaulipas.

Data are lacking to estimate rates of decline, both in the past and for the future, but a continuing decline is inferred from the situation that much of the population of Juniperus angosturana occurs on land that is increasingly under pressure from grazing livestock.

== See also ==
- Endemic flora of Mexico
- Sierra Madre Oriental topics
