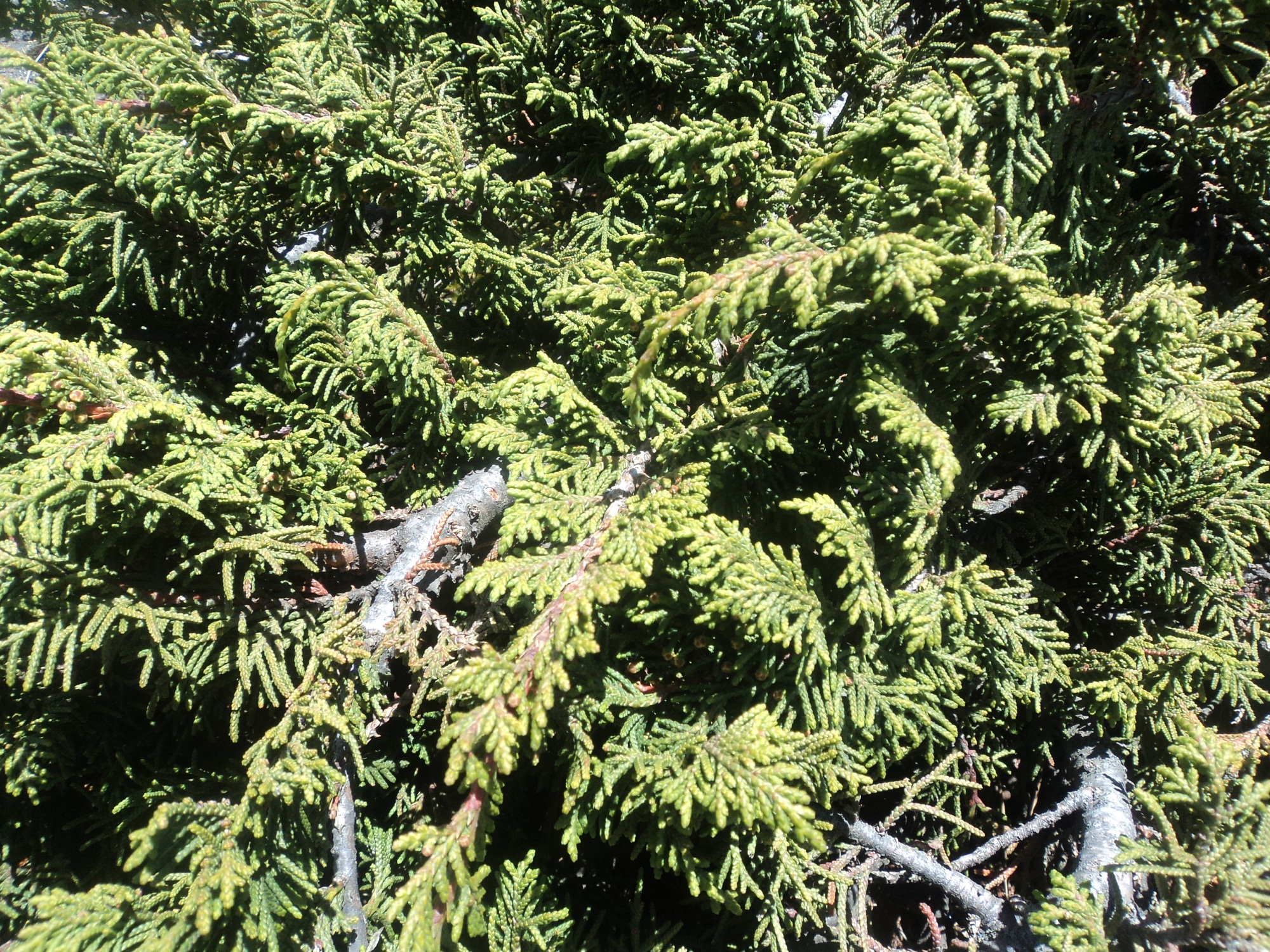

Conservation status
- Least Concern (IUCN 3.1)

Scientific classification
- Kingdom: Plantae
- Clade: Tracheophytes
- Clade: Gymnospermae
- Division: Pinophyta
- Class: Pinopsida
- Order: Cupressales
- Family: Cupressaceae
- Genus: Juniperus
- Species: J. monticola

Binomial name
- Juniperus monticola Martinez

= Juniperus monticola =

Species of conifer

Juniperus monticola, or mountain juniper, is a species of conifer in the family Cupressaceae. It is found only in Mexico.
