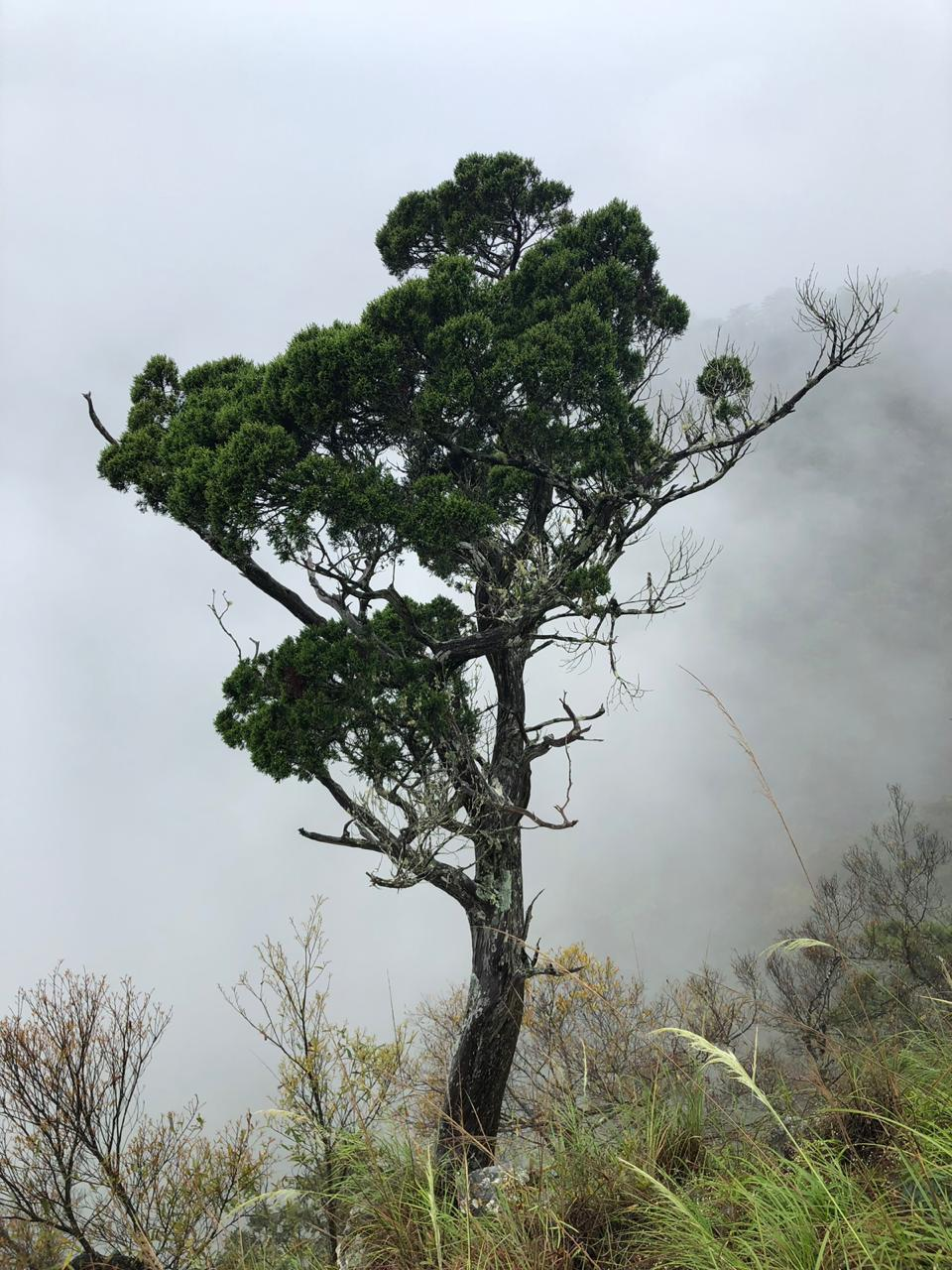

Conservation status
- Endangered (IUCN 3.1)

Scientific classification
- Kingdom: Plantae
- Clade: Tracheophytes
- Clade: Gymnospermae
- Division: Pinophyta
- Class: Pinopsida
- Order: Cupressales
- Family: Cupressaceae
- Genus: Juniperus
- Species: J. jaliscana

Binomial name
- Juniperus jaliscana Martínez

= Juniperus jaliscana =

Species of conifer

Juniperus jaliscana, known commonly as the Jalisco juniper, is a species of conifer in the cypress family, Cupressaceae.

It is endemic to western Mexico. It is known from only two locations, in southern Durango and northwestern Jalisco, where it grows in montane forest.
