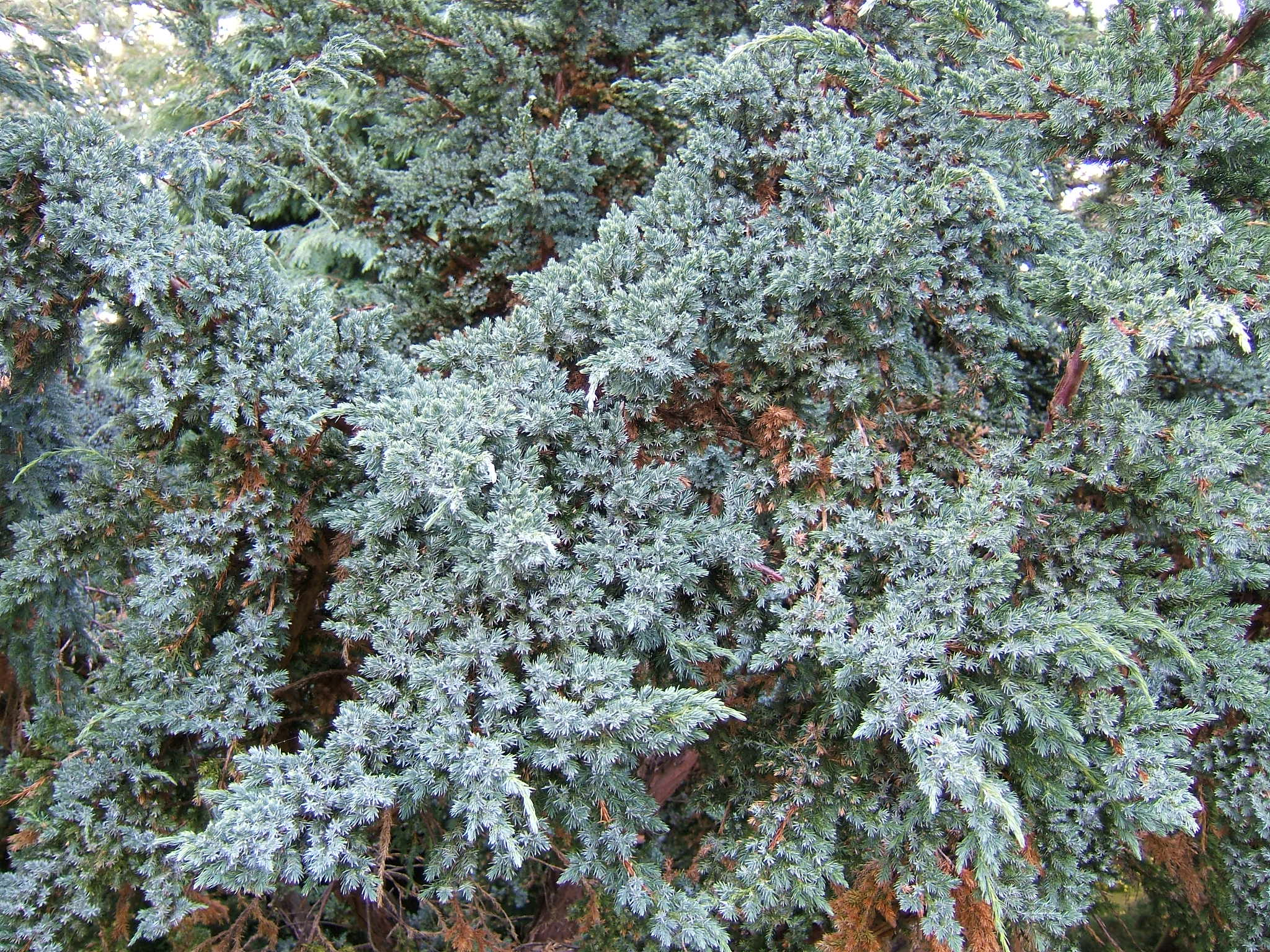
- Foliage of cultivar 'Meyeri'

Conservation status
- Least Concern (IUCN 3.1)

Scientific classification
- Kingdom: Plantae
- Clade: Tracheophytes
- Clade: Gymnosperms
- Division: Pinophyta
- Class: Pinopsida
- Order: Cupressales
- Family: Cupressaceae
- Genus: Juniperus
- Section: Juniperus sect. Sabina
- Species: J. squamata

Binomial name
- Juniperus squamata Buch.-Ham. ex D.Don

= Juniperus squamata =

Himalayan Juniper

Species of plant

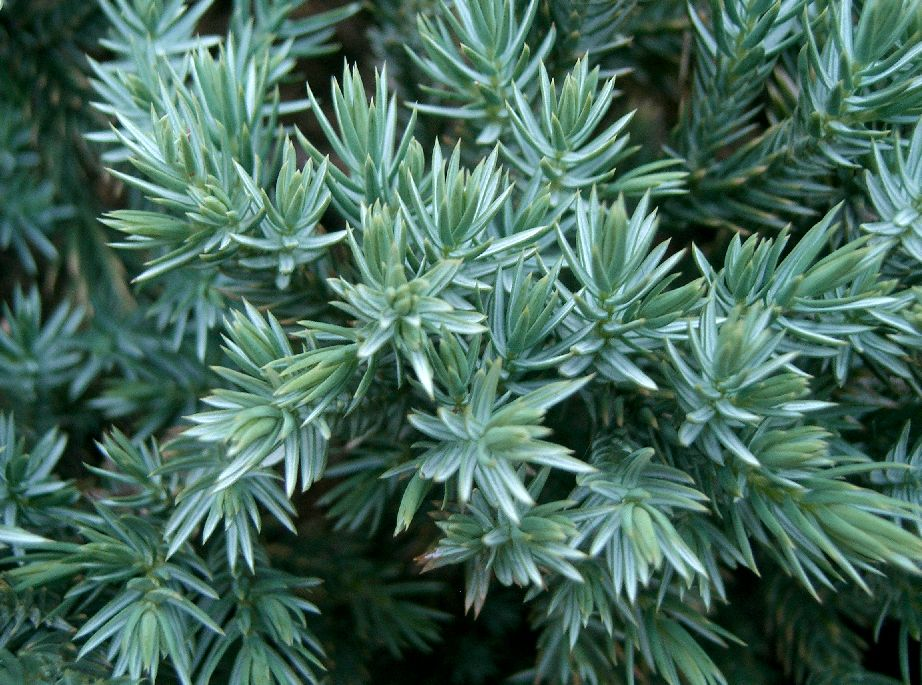
'Blue Star'

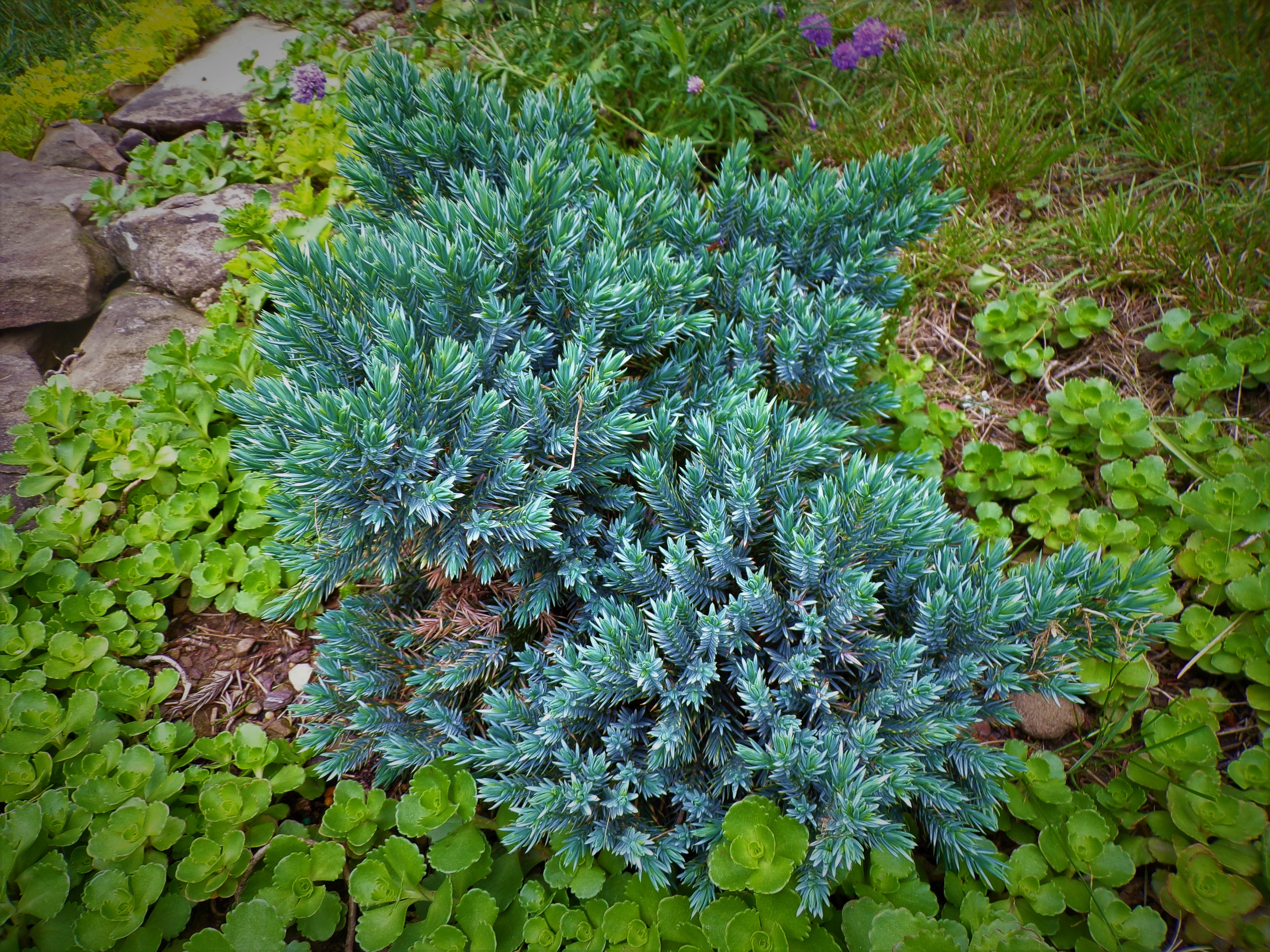
Blue Star juniper shrub in Pennsylvania.

Juniperus squamata, the flaky juniper, or Himalayan juniper is a species of coniferous shrub, or sometimes small tree, in the cypress family Cupressaceae, native to the Himalayas and China.

It represents the provincial tree of Khyber Pakhtunkhwa (unofficial).

== Description ==
It is an evergreen shrub (rarely a small tree) reaching 2–10 metres (6 1/2–33 feet) tall (rarely 15 m), with flaky brown bark, and a prostrate to irregularly-conical crown. The leaves are broad, needle-like, 3–9 millimetres (1/8–3/8 in) long, arranged in six ranks in alternating whorls of three, and often strongly a glaucous blue-green in color. The cones are berry-like, globose to ovoid, 4–9 mm long, and 4–6 mm diameter. Often, they are a glossy black and contain one seed; they are mature in about 18 months. The male cones are 3–4 mm long and shed their pollen in early spring. It is largely dioecious, with pollen and seed cones produced on separate plants, but occasionally monoecious.

== Taxonomy ==
Three to five varieties are accepted, with treatment differing between different authors:

- Juniperus squamata var. squamata – leaves mostly 5–9 mm. Throughout the standard range.
- Juniperus squamata var. fargesii Rehder & E.H.Wilson – leaves mostly 3–5 mm. Confined to the eastern half of the range in China.
- Juniperus squamata var. hongxiensis Y.F.Yu & L.K.Fu; often included in var. squamata.
- Juniperus squamata var. parviflora Y.F.Yu & L.K.Fu; often included in var. squamata.

Juniperus morrisonicola Hayata from Taiwan is often treated as a synonym, or a variety Juniperus squamata var. morrisonicola (Hayata) H.L.Li & H.Keng, but is better treated as a distinct species as it has a distinct DNA profile.

=== Etymology ===
The Latin specific epithet squamata means small, scale-like leaves.

== Distribution and habitat ==
It is found in (and native to) northeastern Afghanistan east to western Yunnan in southwestern China, with disjunct populations north to western Gansu, east to Fujian, and Taiwan. Recently, however, it was introduced to the United States in 1964 after being exported from the Netherlands. It grows at altitudes from 1,600 to 4,900 m (5,200 to 16,100 ft).

== Cultivation ==
Juniperus squamata is widely grown as an ornamental plant in Europe and North America, valued for its bluish foliage and compact habit. The following cultivars have gained the Royal Horticultural Society's Award of Garden Merit:

- 'Blue Carpet'
- 'Blue Star'
- 'Holger'
