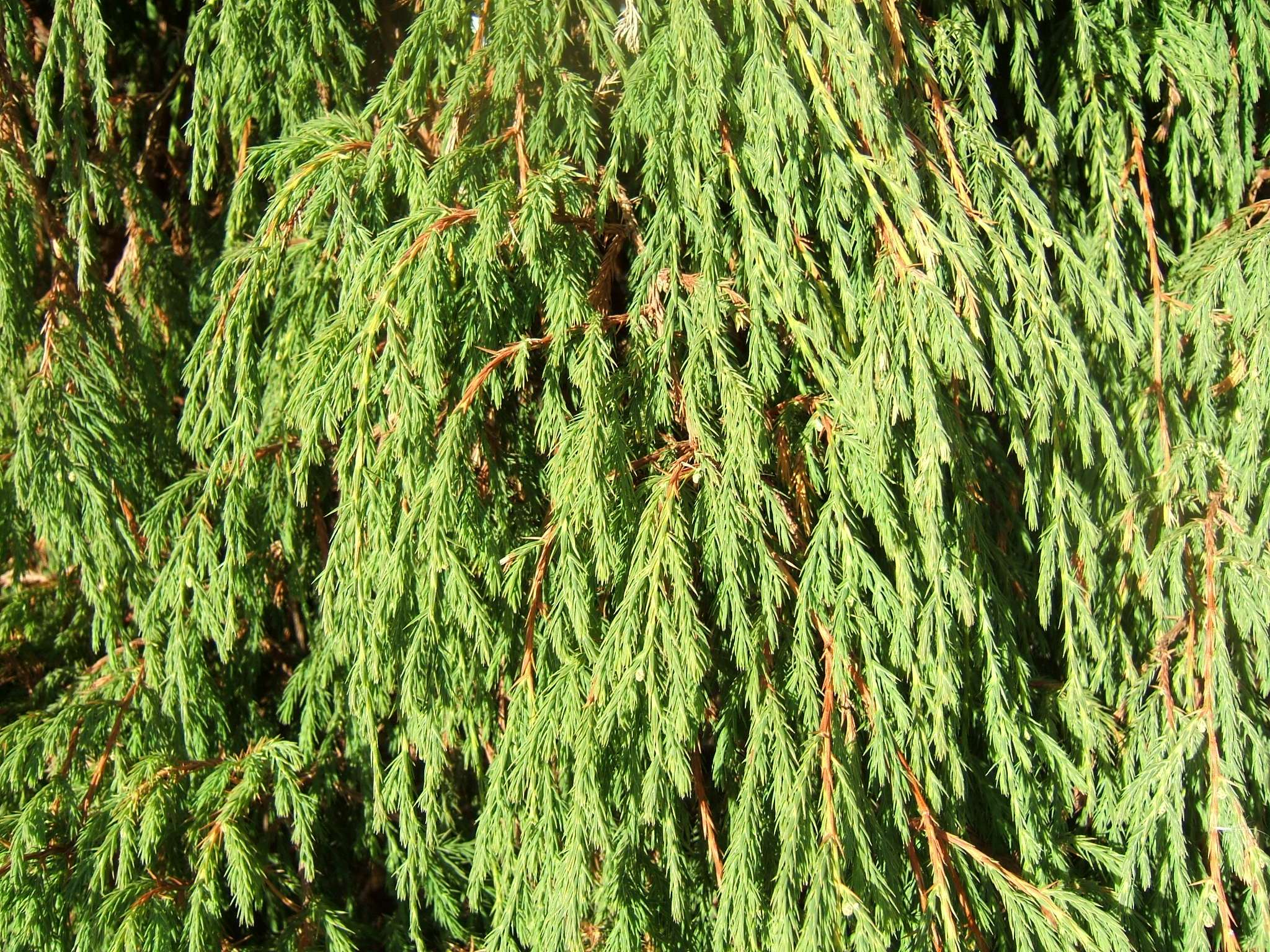
- Foliage on a cultivated plant in Britain

Conservation status
- Least Concern (IUCN 3.1)

Scientific classification
- Kingdom: Plantae
- Clade: Tracheophytes
- Clade: Gymnospermae
- Division: Pinophyta
- Class: Pinopsida
- Order: Cupressales
- Family: Cupressaceae
- Genus: Juniperus
- Section: Juniperus sect. Sabina
- Species: J. recurva

Binomial name
- Juniperus recurva Buch.-Ham. ex D.Don

= Juniperus recurva =

Species of juniper

Juniperus recurva, commonly named the Himalayan juniper or drooping juniper, is a juniper native to the Himalaya, from northern Pakistan, through India, Nepal and Bhutan, to western Yunnan in southwestern China. It grows at altitudes of 3,000–4,000 metres (9,800–13,100 feet).

== Description ==
Juniperus recurva is a large shrub or tree reaching 6–20 metres (20–66 feet) tall (rarely 25 m), with a trunk up to 2 m (6 1/2 ft) in diameter and a broadly conical to rounded or irregular crown. The leaves are needle-like, 5–10 millimetres (3/16–3/8 inch) long, arranged in six ranks in alternating whorls of three.

The cones are berry-like, globose to ovoid, 5–10 mm long and 4–7 mm diameter, glossy blue-black, and contain one seed; they are mature in about 18 months. The male cones are 3–4 mm long, and shed their pollen in early spring. It is largely monoecious with pollen and seed cones produced on the same plants.

=== Varieties ===
There are two varieties, treated as distinct species by some botanists:

- Juniperus recurva var. recurva - leaves mostly 5–8 mm. Throughout the range.
- Juniperus recurva var. coxii - leaves mostly 7–10 mm. Confined to the eastern Himalaya on high rainfall sites.

== Cultivation ==
Juniperus recurva is planted as an ornamental tree in western Europe, valued for its drooping foliage, particularly pendulous in the cultivar 'Castlewellan'.
