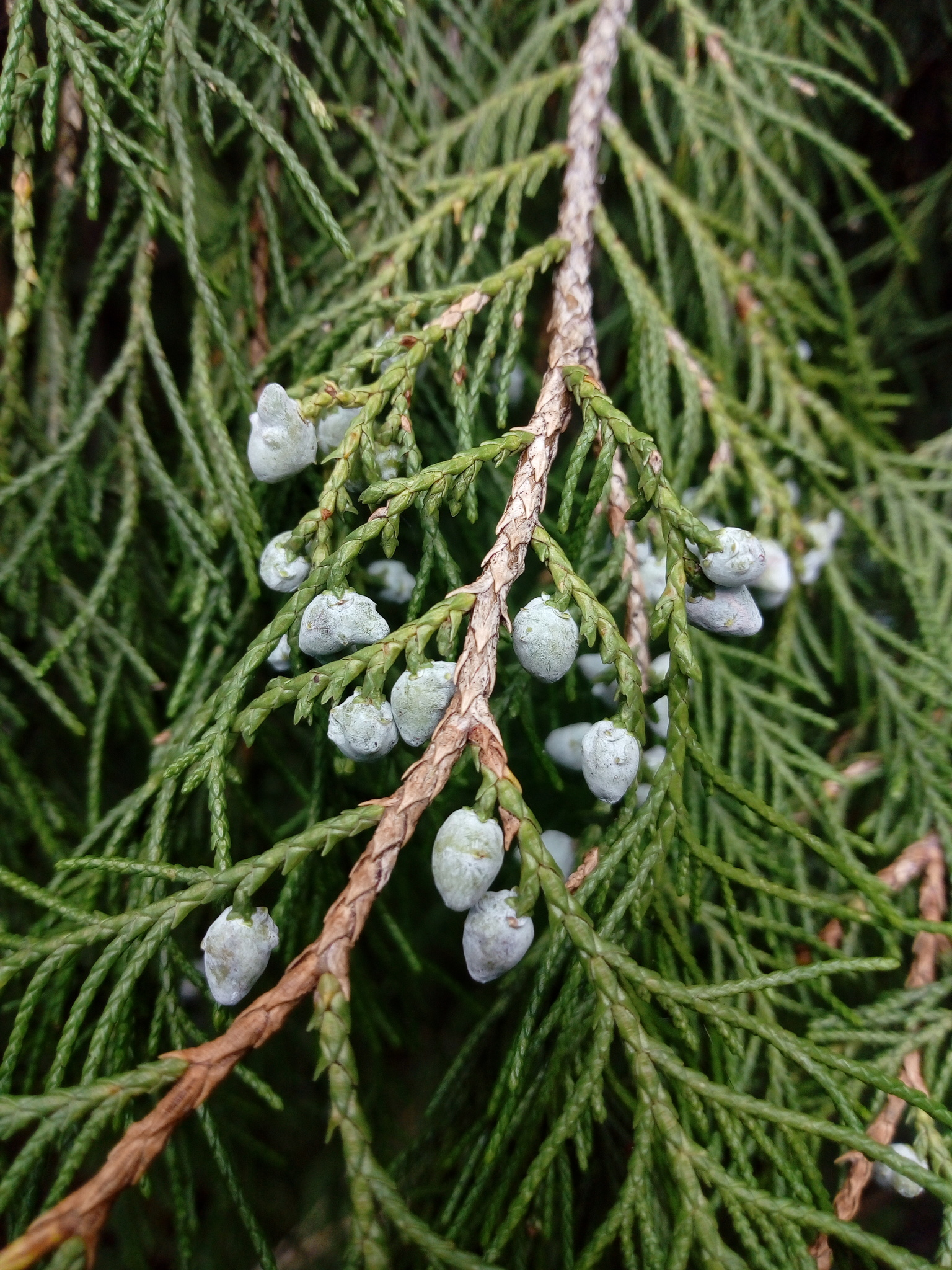

Conservation status
- Near Threatened (IUCN 3.1)

Scientific classification
- Kingdom: Plantae
- Clade: Tracheophytes
- Clade: Gymnospermae
- Division: Pinophyta
- Class: Pinopsida
- Order: Cupressales
- Family: Cupressaceae
- Genus: Juniperus
- Species: J. blancoi

Binomial name
- Juniperus blancoi Martínez

= Juniperus blancoi =

Species of conifer

Juniperus blancoi is a species of conifer in the family Cupressaceae. It is endemic to Mexico.
