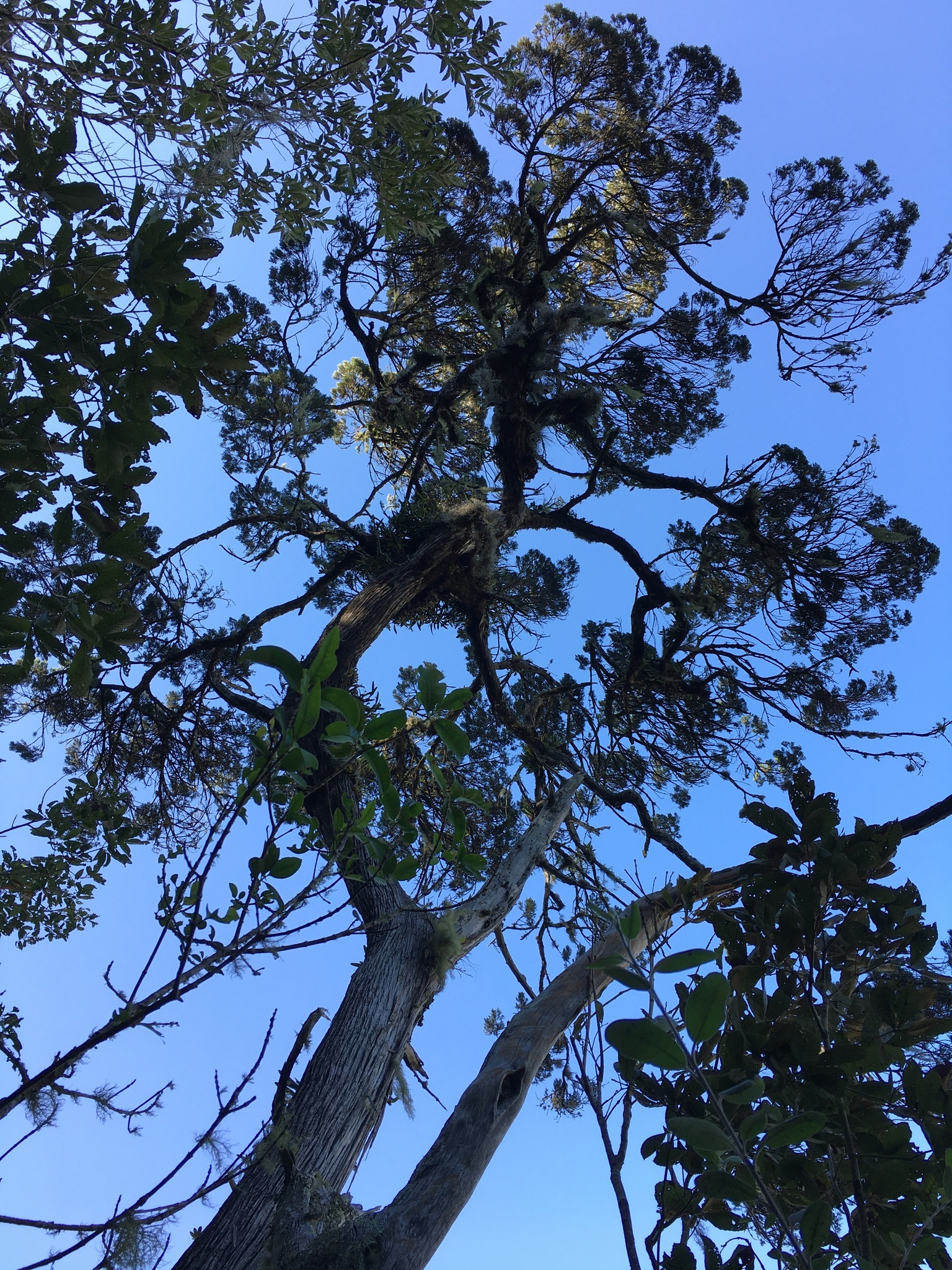

Conservation status
- Endangered (IUCN 3.1)

Scientific classification
- Kingdom: Plantae
- Clade: Embryophytes
- Clade: Tracheophytes
- Clade: Spermatophytes
- Clade: Gymnosperms
- Division: Pinophyta
- Class: Pinopsida
- Order: Cupressales
- Family: Cupressaceae
- Genus: Juniperus
- Species: J. comitana

Binomial name
- Juniperus comitana Martínez (1944)

Synonyms
- Sabina comitana (Martínez) Y.Yang & K.S.Mao

= Juniperus comitana =

Species of conifer

Juniperus comitana is a species of conifer in the family Cupressaceae. It is a tree native to Guatemala and to Chiapas in southern Mexico.
