= Juniperus coahuilensis =

Conservation status
- Least Concern (IUCN 3.1)

Scientific classification
- Kingdom: Plantae
- Clade: Tracheophytes
- Clade: Gymnospermae
- Division: Pinophyta
- Class: Pinopsida
- Order: Cupressales
- Family: Cupressaceae
- Genus: Juniperus
- Species: J. coahuilensis

Binomial name
- Juniperus coahuilensis Martínez Gaussen ex R.P.Adams

Species of conifer

Juniperus coahuilensis, commonly known as redberry juniper, is a species of conifer in the family Cupressaceae.

== Description ==
Juniperus coahuilensis grows as a large shrubby tree up to 8 metres (26 feet) tall. It is usually multi-trunked. The bark is brown to gray, exfoliating in long strips on mature trunks and branches.

The leaves are green to light green, and have glands that can produce a white crystalline exudate.

The cones are a fleshy glaucous yellow-orange to dark red, 6–7 millimetres (1/4–9/32 in) in diameter, and mature in one year.

This species is unusual in that it sprouts from the stump when cut or burned, which has probably allowed it to remain in the grasslands in spite of periodic grass fires that kill all other juniper species.

== Fossil record ==
The species is known to have been present during the Late Wisconsin Glacial Episode of the last glacial period, in North American latitudes defined by fossils from the Waterman Mountains in present-day Arizona.

== Distribution ==
The shrubby tree is found in northern Mexico and areas of the Southwestern United States within central and southeastern Arizona, southwestern New Mexico, and West Texas including Big Bend National Park.

This species occurs in high desert grasslands at elevations of 1,200–2,000 m (3,900–6,600 ft), in Bouteloua spp. grasslands and adjacent rocky areas. In Mexico, it can also occur in canyons or alluvial fans. In the Chihuahuan Desert and Sonoran Desert ecoregions, it often in association with Opuntia spp. and/or Yucca spp.
