= Juniperus komarovii =

Conservation status
- Least Concern (IUCN 3.1)

Scientific classification
- Kingdom: Plantae
- Clade: Tracheophytes
- Clade: Gymnosperms
- Division: Pinophyta
- Class: Pinopsida
- Order: Cupressales
- Family: Cupressaceae
- Genus: Juniperus
- Section: Juniperus sect. Sabina
- Species: J. komarovii

Binomial name
- Juniperus komarovii Florin

Synonyms
- Juniperus glaucescens Florin; Sabina komarovii (Florin) W.C.Cheng & W.T.Wang

Species of conifer

Juniperus komarovii is a species of conifer in the family Cupressaceae. It is found only in China. It is a monoecious tree reaching up to 20 m (66 ft) in height, usually with a single straight trunk, drooping branches and an irregular, open crown. It grows in forests at elevations of 3,000–4,000 m (9,800–13,100 ft).
