= Juniperus saltillensis =

Conservation status
- Endangered (IUCN 3.1)

Scientific classification
- Kingdom: Plantae
- Clade: Tracheophytes
- Clade: Gymnospermae
- Division: Pinophyta
- Class: Pinopsida
- Order: Cupressales
- Family: Cupressaceae
- Genus: Juniperus
- Species: J. saltillensis

Binomial name
- Juniperus saltillensis M. T. Hall

Species of conifer

Juniperus saltillensis is a species of conifer in the family Cupressaceae.

The shrub or bushy tree is endemic to northern Mexico, in the states of Chihuahua, Coahuila, Nuevo León, and Zacatecas.

It is sometimes an understorey shrub in pinyon–juniper woodland, or open Madrean pine-oak woodlands or oak woodlands forests. It is found at elevations of 1,800–2,900 metres (5,900–9,500 feet)

== See also ==
- Sierra Madre Occidental pine-oak forests
