= Juniperus convallium =

Conservation status
- Least Concern (IUCN 3.1)

Scientific classification
- Kingdom: Plantae
- Clade: Embryophytes
- Clade: Tracheophytes
- Clade: Spermatophytes
- Clade: Gymnosperms
- Division: Pinophyta
- Class: Pinopsida
- Order: Cupressales
- Family: Cupressaceae
- Genus: Juniperus
- Section: Juniperus sect. Sabina
- Species: J. convallium

Binomial name
- Juniperus convallium Rehder & E.H.Wilson

Species of conifer

Juniperus convallium is a species of conifer in the family Cupressaceae. It is a tree that is found only in the mountains of the Chinese provinces of Tibet, Qinghai, and Sichuan.
