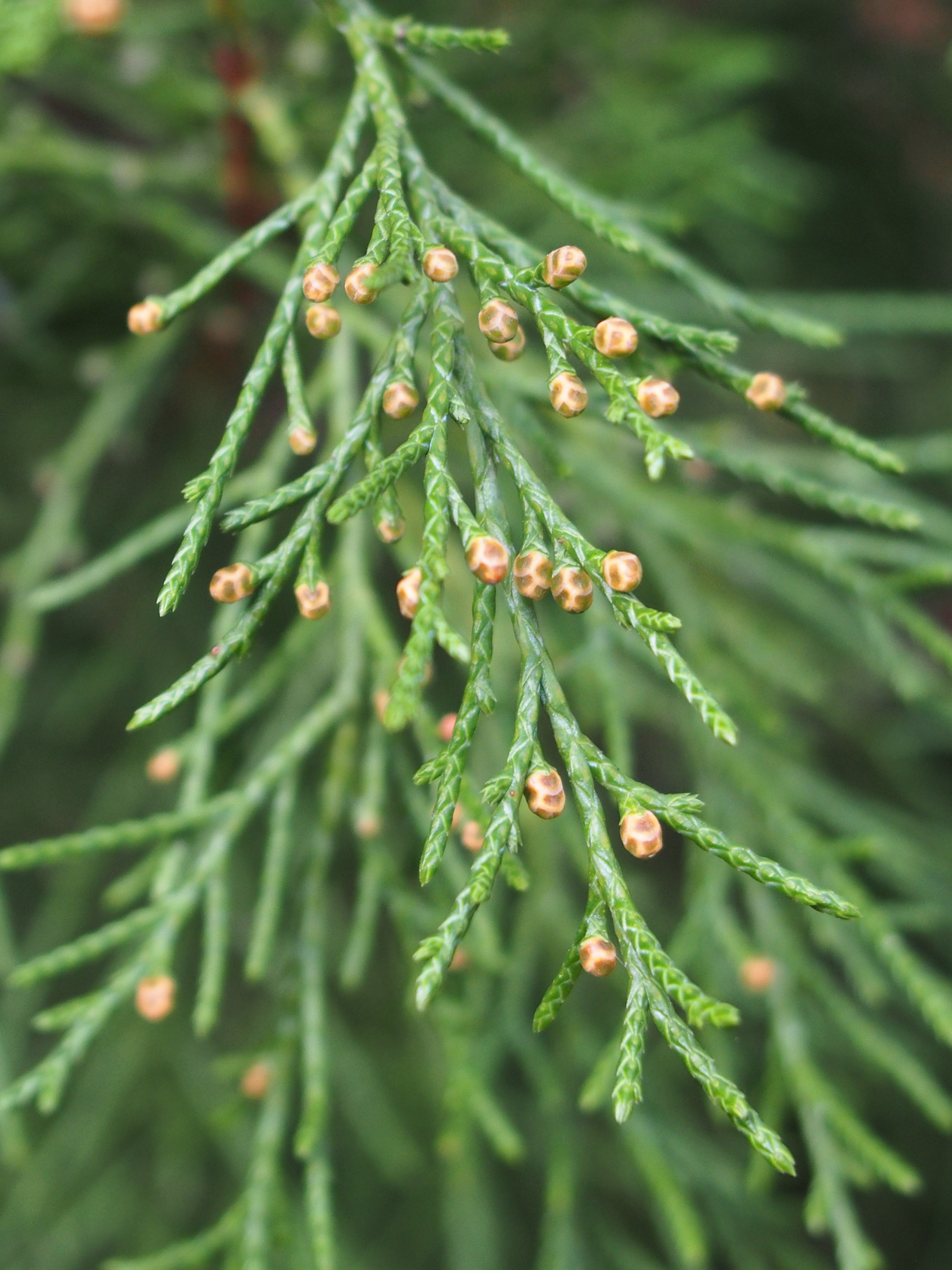

Conservation status
- Least Concern (IUCN 3.1)

Scientific classification
- Kingdom: Plantae
- Clade: Tracheophytes
- Clade: Gymnospermae
- Division: Pinophyta
- Class: Pinopsida
- Order: Cupressales
- Family: Cupressaceae
- Genus: Juniperus
- Section: Juniperus sect. Sabina
- Species: J. pseudosabina

Binomial name
- Juniperus pseudosabina Fisch. & C.A.Mey.

Synonyms
- J. centrasiatica Kom.; J. turkestanica Kom.

= Juniperus pseudosabina =

Species of juniper

Juniperus pseudosabina, the Turkestan juniper or dwarf black juniper is a species of juniper.

== Description ==
Juniperus pseudosabina is variable in shape, growing as a shrub or small tree, reaching 1–10 metres (3 1/2–33 feet) tall. The leaves are of two forms, juvenile needle-like leaves 4–8 millimetres (3/16–5/16 inch) long, and adult scale-leaves 1.3–2 mm long on shoots 1.5–2 mm thick. Juvenile leaves are found mainly on seedlings but mature plants continue to bear some juvenile leaves as well as adult, particularly on shoots damaged by browsing.

It is largely dioecious with separate male and female plants, but some individual plants produce both sexes. The cones are berry-like, 8–14 mm long and 7–10 mm diameter, blue-black with a whitish waxy bloom, and contain a single seed; they are mature in about 18 months. The male cones are 2–3 mm long, and shed their pollen in late winter.

== Distribution ==
The plant is native to the mountains of Central Asia in northern Pakistan, northeastern Afghanistan, Tajikistan, Kyrgyzstan, eastern Kazakhstan, western China, western Mongolia, and south-central Russia.

It typically grows at altitudes of 2,000–4,100 m (6,600–13,500 ft).

== Conservation ==
Although it has a wide distribution and is not currently threatened, increased grazing by domestic livestock in the region could threaten it in the future.
