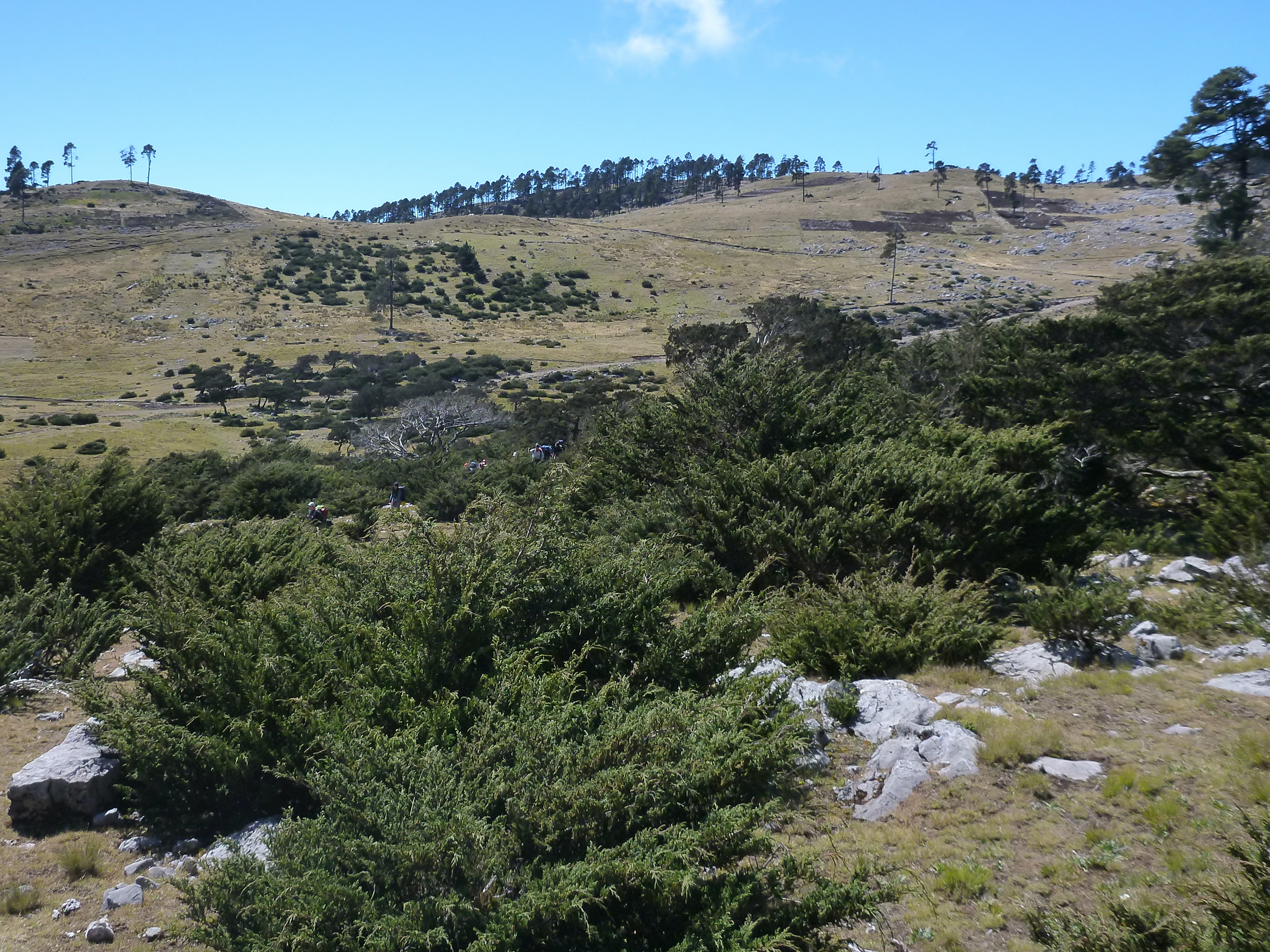

Conservation status
- Endangered (IUCN 3.1)

Scientific classification
- Kingdom: Plantae
- Clade: Tracheophytes
- Clade: Gymnospermae
- Division: Pinophyta
- Class: Pinopsida
- Order: Cupressales
- Family: Cupressaceae
- Genus: Juniperus
- Species: J. standleyi

Binomial name
- Juniperus standleyi Steyerm.

= Juniperus standleyi =

Species of conifer

Juniperus standleyi is a species of juniper native to Guatemala and the adjacent extreme southeast of Mexico (Volcán Tacaná in Chiapas), where it occurs at elevations of 3,000–4,250 metres (9,840–13,940 feet). Its local common names include huitó, ciprés, and huitum.

== Description ==
Juniperus standleyi is an evergreen coniferous shrub or small to medium-sized tree growing to 5–15 metres (16–49 feet), rarely 20 m, in height. The leaves are of two forms, juvenile needle-like leaves 5–7 millimetres long on seedlings and occasionally (as regrowth after browsing damage) on adult plants, and adult scale-leaves 1–1.5 mm long on older plants; they are arranged in decussate opposite pairs or whorls of three.

The cones are globose, berry-like, 6–9 mm in diameter, blue-black with a thin pale waxy coating, and contain three to six seeds; they are mature in about 18 months. The male cones are 1.5–2 mm long, and shed their pollen in spring. It is dioecious with male and female cones on separate plants.

== Conservation ==
Juniperus standleyi is threatened by habitat loss and illegal cutting for fuelwood.
