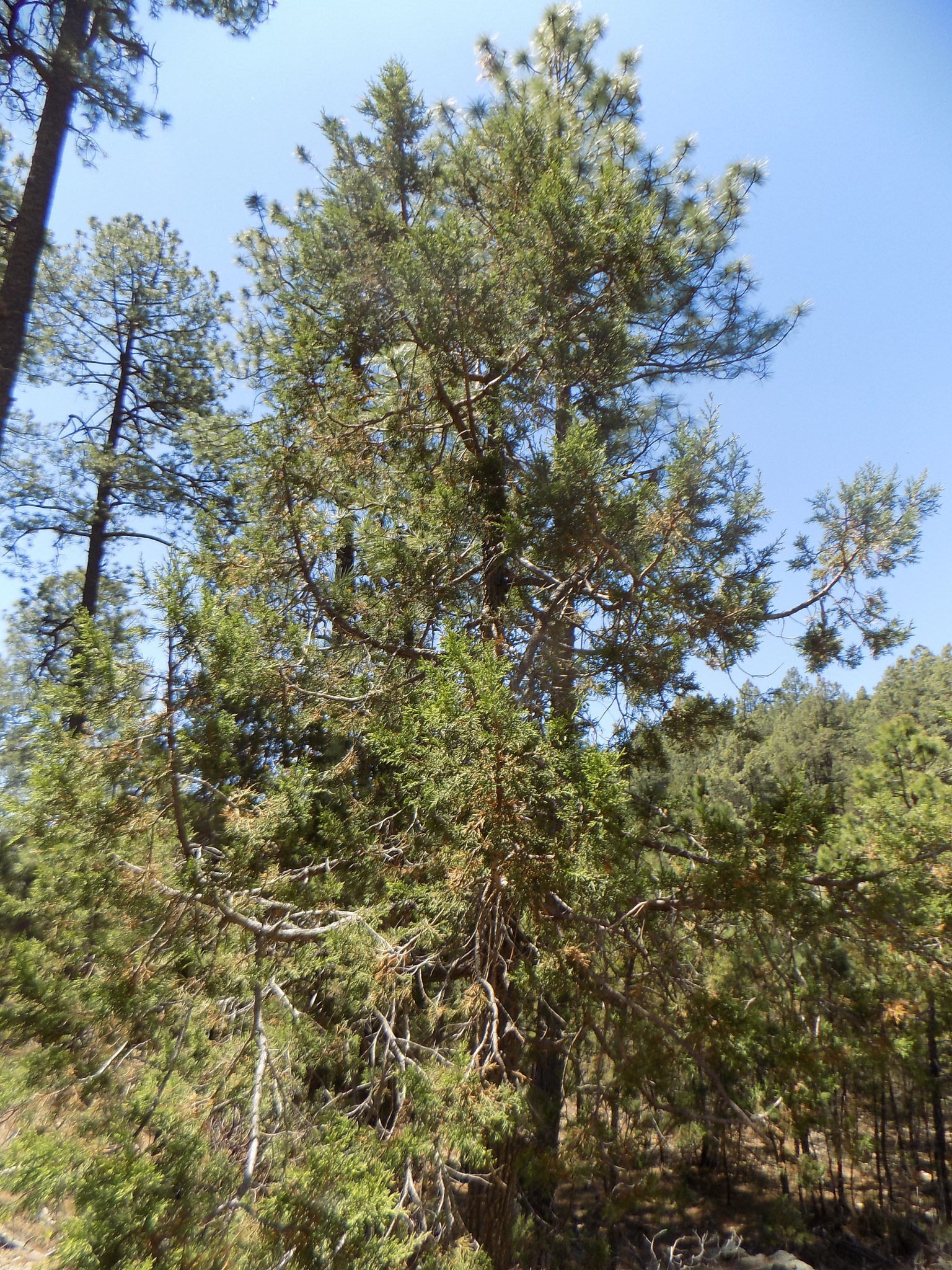

Conservation status
- Least Concern (IUCN 3.1)

Scientific classification
- Kingdom: Plantae
- Clade: Tracheophytes
- Clade: Gymnospermae
- Division: Pinophyta
- Class: Pinopsida
- Order: Cupressales
- Family: Cupressaceae
- Genus: Juniperus
- Species: J. durangensis

Binomial name
- Juniperus durangensis Martínez

= Juniperus durangensis =

Species of conifer

Juniperus durangensis is a species of conifer in the family Cupressaceae.

It is endemic to Mexico, in the states of Aguascalientes, Chihuahua, Durango, Jalisco, Sonora, Zacatecas.
