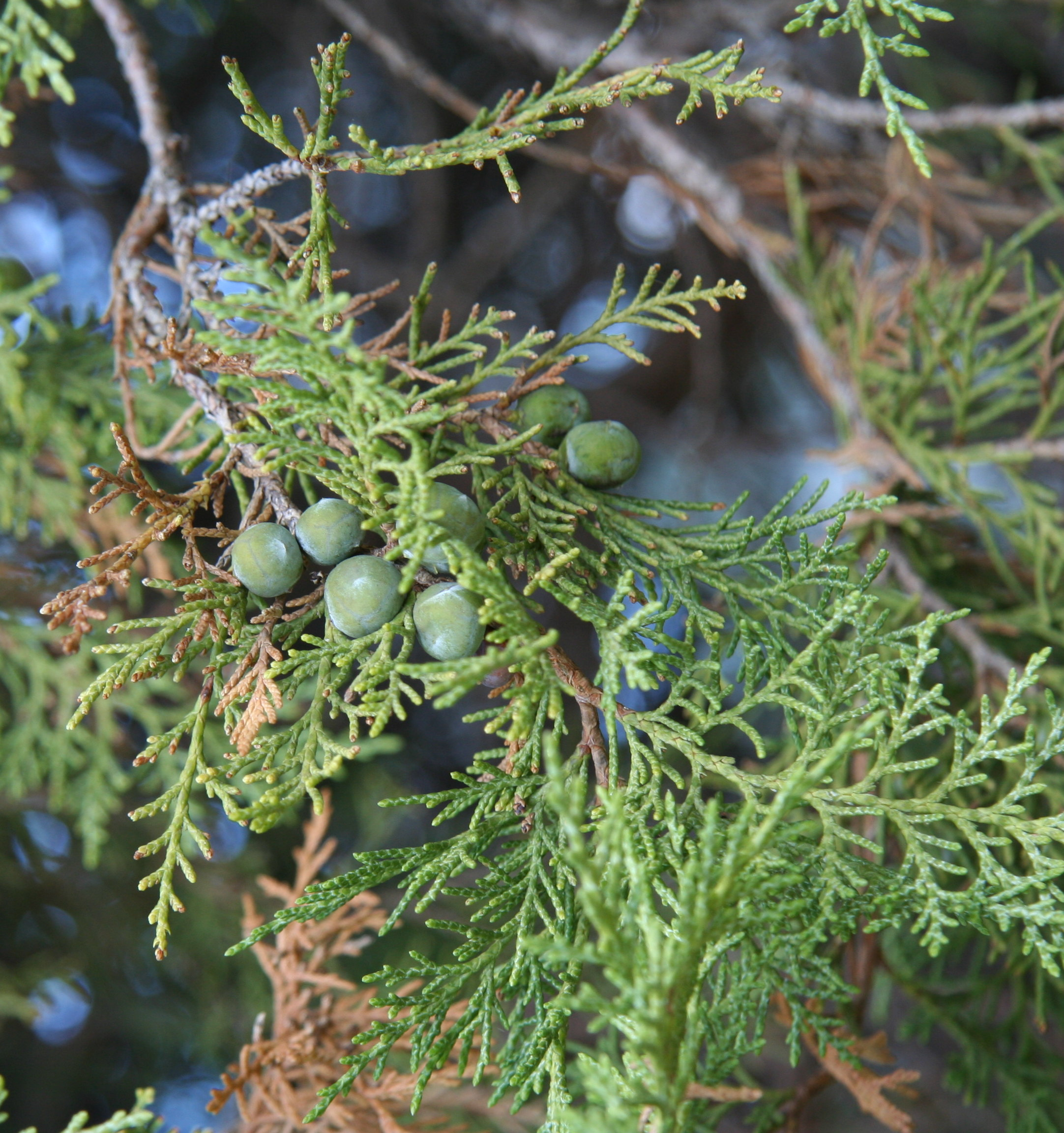

Scientific classification
- Kingdom: Plantae
- Clade: Tracheophytes
- Clade: Gymnospermae
- Division: Pinophyta
- Class: Pinopsida
- Order: Cupressales
- Family: Cupressaceae
- Genus: Juniperus
- Species: J. polycarpos

Binomial name
- Juniperus polycarpos K.Koch
- Distribution of Juniperus excelsa complex

Synonyms
- Juniperus excelsa subsp. polycarpos (K.Koch) Takht.; Juniperus excelsa var. polycarpos (K.Koch) Silba

= Juniperus polycarpos =

Species of plant

Juniperus polycarpos, commonly known as Persian juniper, is species of juniper native to western Asia.

Some authorities classify it as a subspecies or variety of Juniperus excelsa.

There are two recognized varieties. J. polycarpos var. polycarpos ranges from Azerbaijan and Armenia to the Zagros Mountains of western Iran. J. polycarpos var. turcomanica ranges along the eastern Elburz and Kopet Dag mountains of northeastern Iran and southern Turkmenistan. J. seravschanica, which ranges further east into Central Asia and Afghanistan, is sometimes treated as a variety of J. polycarpos.
