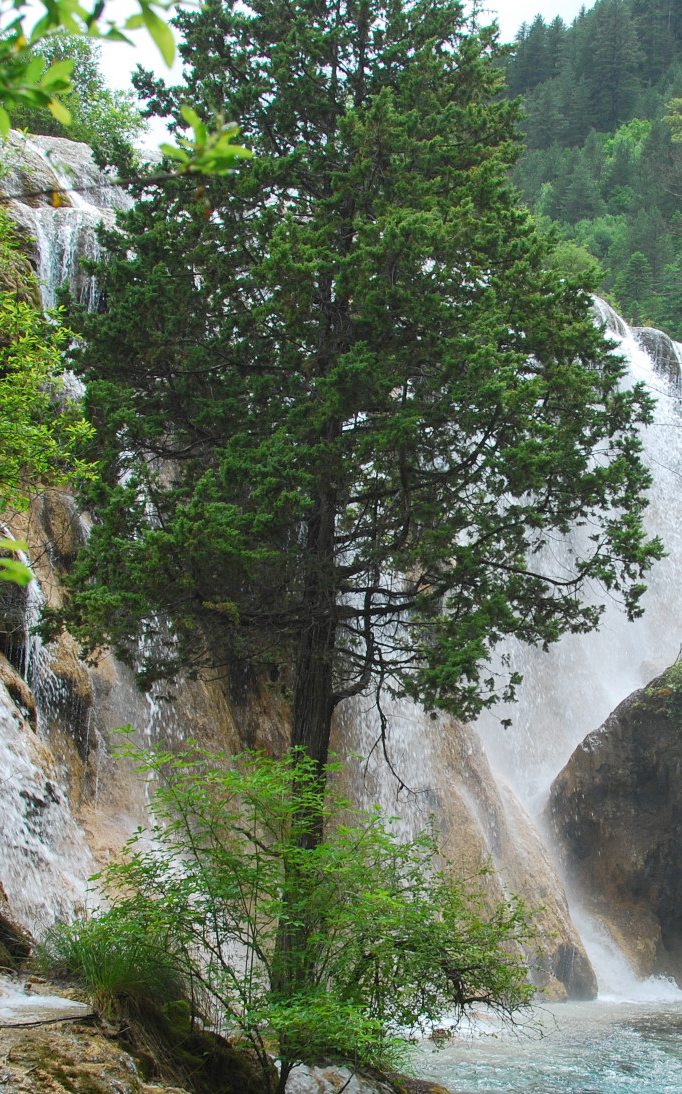

Conservation status
- Least Concern (IUCN 3.1)

Scientific classification
- Kingdom: Plantae
- Clade: Tracheophytes
- Clade: Gymnospermae
- Division: Pinophyta
- Class: Pinopsida
- Order: Cupressales
- Family: Cupressaceae
- Genus: Juniperus
- Section: Juniperus sect. Sabina
- Species: J. saltuaria

Binomial name
- Juniperus saltuaria Rehder & E.H.Wilson

Synonyms
- Sabina saltuaria (Rehder & E.H.Wilson) W.C.Cheng & W.T.Wang

= Juniperus saltuaria =

Species of conifer

Juniperus saltuaria is a species of conifer in the family Cupressaceae. It is endemic to southern China and Tibet. The trees grow up to 20 metres (66 feet) tall.
