= Juniperus gamboana =

Conservation status
- Endangered (IUCN 3.1)

Scientific classification
- Kingdom: Plantae
- Clade: Embryophytes
- Clade: Tracheophytes
- Clade: Spermatophytes
- Clade: Gymnosperms
- Division: Pinophyta
- Class: Pinopsida
- Order: Cupressales
- Family: Cupressaceae
- Genus: Juniperus
- Species: J. gamboana

Binomial name
- Juniperus gamboana Martínez

Species of conifer

Juniperus gamboana is a species of conifer in the family Cupressaceae. It is found in Guatemala and Mexico, where it is threatened by habitat loss.
