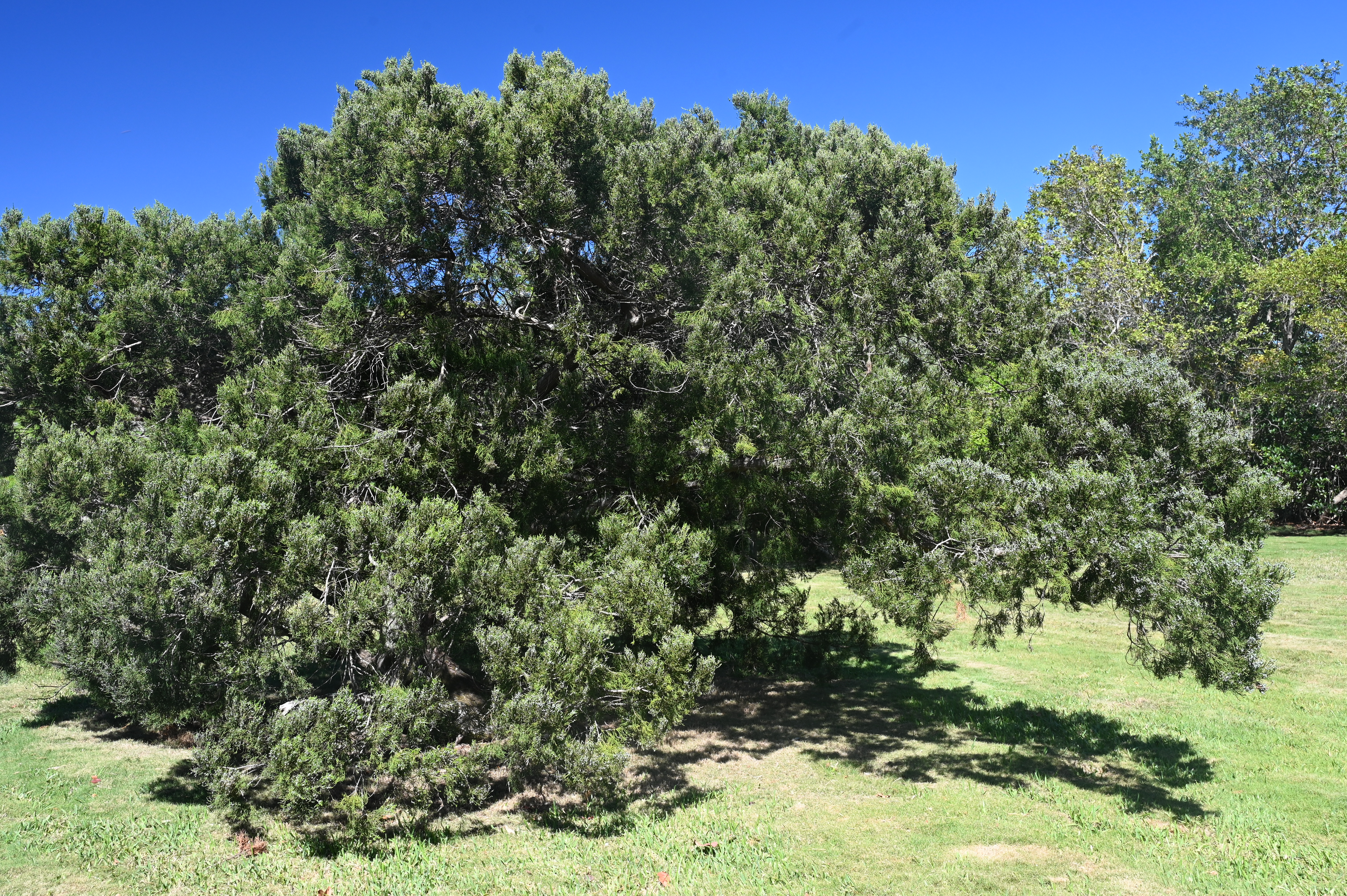
- At Fairchild Tropical Botanic Garden, Florida

Conservation status
- Vulnerable (IUCN 3.1)

Scientific classification
- Kingdom: Plantae
- Clade: Embryophytes
- Clade: Tracheophytes
- Clade: Gymnosperms
- Division: Pinophyta
- Class: Pinopsida
- Order: Cupressales
- Family: Cupressaceae
- Genus: Juniperus
- Species: J. barbadensis

Binomial name
- Juniperus barbadensis L.

Synonyms
- Sabina barbadensis (L.) Small

= Juniperus barbadensis =

Species of conifer

Juniperus barbadensis, also known as West Indian juniper, is a species of conifer in the family Cupressaceae endemic to the West Indies.

== Distribution and habitat ==
It is native to the Bahamas, Cuba, Jamaica, and Saint Lucia; the latter two countries have only a single population remaining. It was formerly found on Barbados and Hispaniola (in Haiti), but is now extirpated from both locales.
