= Juniperus pingii =

Conservation status
- Near Threatened (IUCN 3.1)

Scientific classification
- Kingdom: Plantae
- Clade: Tracheophytes
- Clade: Gymnospermae
- Division: Pinophyta
- Class: Pinopsida
- Order: Cupressales
- Family: Cupressaceae
- Genus: Juniperus
- Species: J. pingii

Binomial name
- Juniperus pingii W.C.Cheng

Synonyms
- Juniperus baimashanensis Y.F.Yu & L.K.Fu; Juniperus carinata (Y.F.Yu & L.K.Fu) R.P.Adams; Juniperus chengii L.K.Fu & Y.F.Yu; Sabina pingii (W.C.Cheng ex Ferré) W.C.Cheng & W.T.Wang

Species of conifer

Juniperus pingii is a species of conifer in the family Cupressaceae. Commonly used in bonsai, it can produce a correct proportional miniature version of the full size tree. It is native only to China. It is named after the Chinese botanist Wan Chun Cheng.
