= Wan-Chun Cheng =

Chinese botanist (1908–1987)

Wan Chun Cheng
- 郑万钧
- Born: June 24, 1908; Xuan'en County, Hubei, China
- Died: July 25, 1987 (aged 79); Beijing, China
- Known for: Identification of the Dawn Redwood (Metasequoia glyptostroboides)
- Scientific career
- Fields: Botany, Taxonomy
- Workplaces: National Central University (Nanjing); Chinese Academy of Forestry
- Author abbrev. (botany): W.C.Cheng

Wan Chun Cheng or Zheng Wanjun (simplified Chinese: 郑万钧; traditional Chinese: 鄭萬鈞; pinyin: Zhèng Wànjūn; Wade–Giles: Wan Chung Cheng, 24 June 1908 – 25 July 1987) was a Chinese botanist. Initially one of the Chinese plant collectors who followed in the wake of the Europeans after 1920, he became one of the world's leading authorities on the taxonomy of gymnosperms. Working at the National Central University in Nanjing, he was instrumental, along with H.H.Hu, in the identification in 1944 of the dawn redwood, Metasequoia glyptostroboides, previously known only from fossils and was long thought extinct. The plant Juniperus chengii is named in his honour, as well as the plant genus Chengiopanax.
