= Bucculatrix inusitata =

Scientific classification
- Kingdom: Animalia
- Phylum: Arthropoda
- Clade: Pancrustacea
- Class: Insecta
- Order: Lepidoptera
- Family: Bucculatricidae
- Genus: Bucculatrix
- Species: B. inusitata

Binomial name
- Bucculatrix inusitata Braun, 1963

Species of moth

Bucculatrix inusitata is a species of moth in the family Bucculatricidae. It is found in North America, where it has been recorded from Quebec, Ontario, Indiana, Maine, Massachusetts, New York and New Jersey. It was described in 1963 by Annette Frances Braun.

The wingspan is 9.5–10 mm.

The larvae possibly feed on Juniperus communis.
