= Remington, Ohio =

- Census-designated place
- Location in Hamilton County and the state of Ohio
- Coordinates: 39°13′44″N 84°19′20″W
- Country: United States
- State: Ohio
- County: Hamilton

Area
  - Total: 0.23 sq mi (0.60 km^{2})
  - Land: 0.23 sq mi (0.59 km^{2})
  - Water: 0.0039 sq mi (0.01 km^{2})
- Elevation: 581 ft (177 m)

Population (2020)
  - Total: 368
  - Density: 1,614.0/sq mi (623.16/km^{2})
- Time zone: UTC-5 (Eastern (EST))
  - Summer (DST): UTC-4 (EDT)
- FIPS code: 39-66180
- GNIS feature ID: 2585523

Remington is a small hamlet and census-designated place (CDP) in Symmes Township, Hamilton County, Ohio, United States. It is adjacent to Loveland, Indian Hill, and Camp Dennison and is considered part of the Greater Cincinnati area. It is included in the Indian Hill Exempted Village School District. The population of Remington was 368 at the 2020 census.

== Geography ==
Remington is located in the valley of the Little Miami River. It is 16 miles (26 km) northeast of downtown Cincinnati.

According to the United States Census Bureau, the CDP has a total area of 0.19 square miles (0.5 km^{2}), all land.

== Demographics ==
Historical population
Census	Pop.	Note	%±
2020	368		—
U.S. Decennial Census

As of the census of 2020, there were 368 people living in the CDP, for a population density of 1,614.04 people per square mile (623.16/km^{2}). There were 148 housing units. The racial makeup of the CDP was 80.4% White, 0.8% Black or African American, 0.0% Native American, 9.5% Asian, 0.0% Pacific Islander, 0.5% from some other race, and 8.7% from two or more races. 4.3% of the population were Hispanic or Latino of any race.

There were 227 households, out of which 36.6% had children under the age of 18 living with them, 48.0% were married couples living together, 10.6% had a male householder with no spouse present, and 11.9% had a female householder with no spouse present. 5.7% of all households were made up of individuals, and 0.0% were someone living alone who was 65 years of age or older. The average household size was 2.76, and the average family size was 3.33.

27.0% of the CDP's population were under the age of 18, 71.2% were 18 to 64, and 1.8% were 65 years of age or older. The median age was 36.3. For every 100 females, there were 80.2 males.

According to the U.S. Census American Community Survey, for the period 2016-2020 the estimated median annual income for a household in the CDP was $173,984, and the median income for a family was $174,922. About 4.3% of the population were living below the poverty line, including 0.0% of those under age 18 and 0.0% of those age 65 or over. About 72.6% of the population were employed, and 68.7% had a bachelor's degree or higher.
