= Washington Heights School =

- U.S. National Register of Historic Places
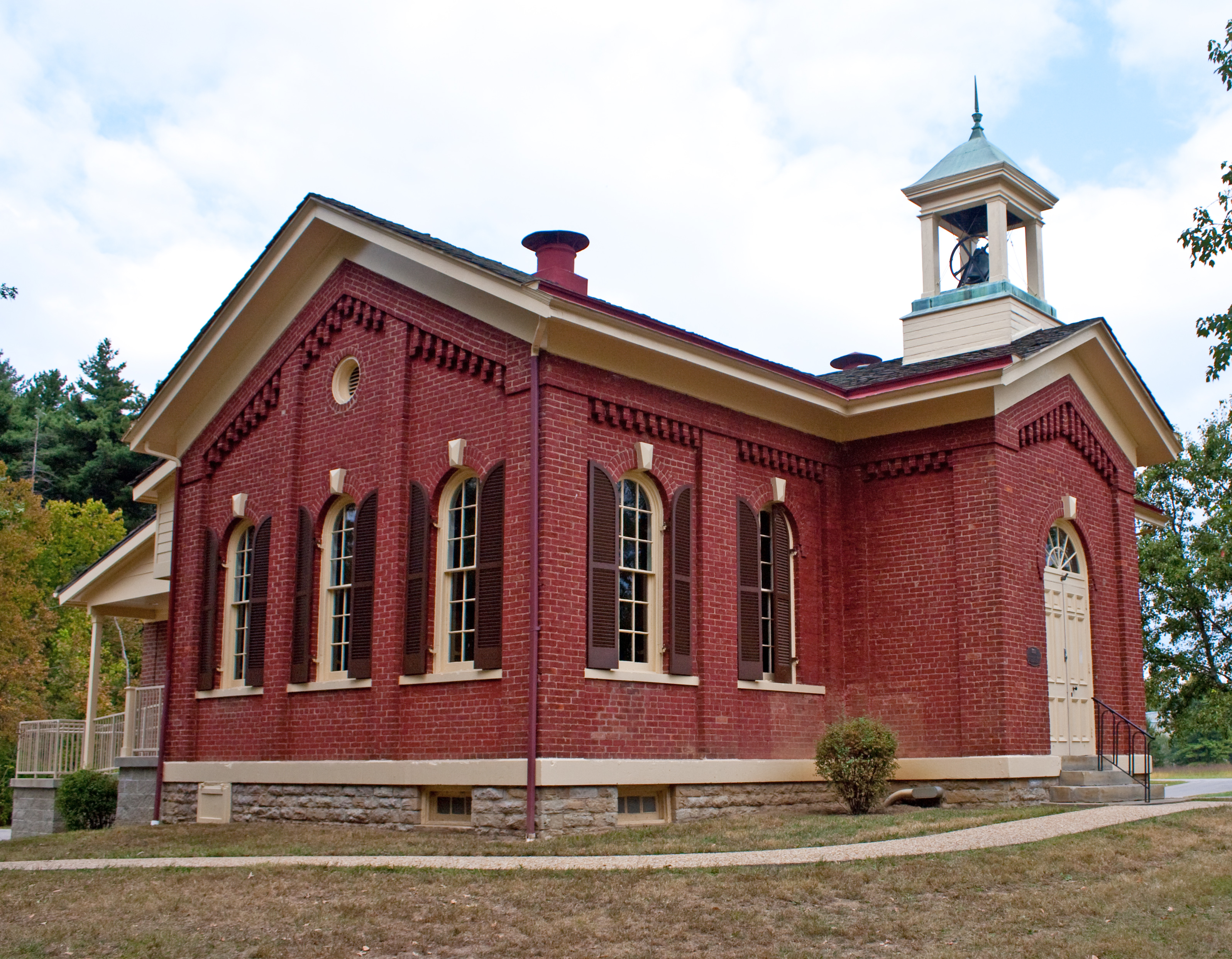

- Location within Ohio Location within the United States
- Location: Indian Hill, Ohio
- Coordinates: 39°12′15.65″N 84°19′27.80″W
- NRHP reference No.: 75001430
- Added to NRHP: July 30, 1975

Washington Heights School is a registered historic building in Indian Hill, Ohio, listed in the National Register on July 30, 1975.

The Washington Heights School is one of five sites in Indian Hill that is listed on the National Register, along with the Elliott House, the Jefferson Schoolhouse, the Gordon E. Pape House, and the Methodist church.

== Historic uses ==
- The Washington Heights School, also known as "The Little Red Schoolhouse", was built in 1873 in what is now the Village of Indian Hill, Ohio (a suburb northeast of Cincinnati). It replaced a log building diagonally opposite today's site at the northeast corner of Given Road and Camargo Road. The building was operated as a rural one-room schoolhouse until 1940. It was one of three schools in today's Village boundaries (the others being the Jefferson School and the Franklin School).
- The Village of Indian Hill used it as Administrative Offices from approximately 1941 until 1956.
- The Board of Education of Indian Hill Schools utilized the building from 1961 to 1972.
- The Indian Hill Historical Society was formed in 1973 and restored the schoolhouse. A kitchen, restrooms, and handicap accessibility ramp were part of the renovations.
- Today the building is available for rent for weddings, parties, meetings, etc. Additionally, the Indian Hill Historical Society uses it for various educational programs including a one-room schoolhouse experience for local schools' 4th graders.
