= Camp Dennison =

- Camp Dennison, Ohio, near Cincinnati
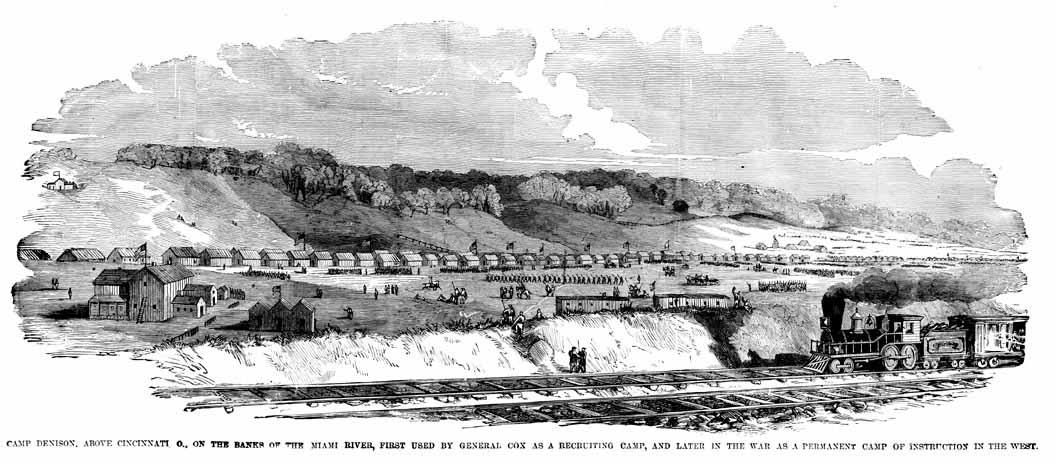
- Camp Dennison

Site information
- Type: Military recruiting and training post
- Controlled by: United States (Union Army)

Site history
- Built: 1861
- In use: 1861-1865

- Waldschmidt-Camp Dennison District
- U.S. National Register of Historic Places
- U.S. Historic district
- Location within Ohio Location within the United States
- Location: 7509 and 7567 Glendale-Milford Rd., Symmes Township, Hamilton County, Ohio, near Cincinnati, Ohio
- Coordinates: 39°11′28″N 84°17′26″W
- Area: less than one acre
- Built: 1804
- NRHP reference No.: 73001471
- Added to NRHP: March 07, 1973

Camp Dennison was a military recruiting, training, and medical post for the United States Army during the American Civil War. It was located near Cincinnati, Ohio, not far from the Ohio River. The camp was named for Cincinnati native William Dennison, Ohio's governor at the start of the war.

With the outbreak of the Civil War in 1861, George B. McClellan, commander of Ohio's state militia, was charged by Governor Dennison with selecting a site for a recruitment and training center for southern Ohio, a possible target for the Confederate States Army due to its Ohio River location and proximity to slave states such as Kentucky and Virginia, from which invasions could be launched. McClellan was joined by Joshua H. Bates and another member of the militia in preparing the plans for the new camp. The site was actually chosen by then Captain William S. Rosecrans, who chose a level tract of land near Indian Hill, Ohio, 17 miles (27 km) from Cincinnati. The land was on both sides of the Little Miami Railroad (LMR) tracks, which ended at Cincinnati's Public Landing. There are variable area listed, but 700 acres (2.8 km^{2}) of land appears to have been rented from the Buckingham and Nimrod Price families. They were offered $12 to $20 per acre per month, a figure named without negotiation, and considered generous. Rosecrans laid out the camp via survey around April 24, 1861, and a large contingent of recruits from Camp Chase, numbering about 1,500 men were sent by train. The first post commander was Melancthon Smith Wade, a Cincinnatian who was a former general in the Ohio Militia.

The LMR could transport volunteers from Central Ohio, and from areas along those tracks. The location had fresh water in the nearby Little Miami River but the recruits had to be trained to use latrines, for in 1862, the United States Sanitary Commission reported that men refused to use latrines, and instead used an area hillside, at the bottom of which was their water supply. It was the Little Miami Railroad which could transport troops quickly into Cincinnati in case of enemy threat. However, among the men initially sent, there were less than a dozen muskets among them, but presumably the Confederates, if they considered attacking Cincinnati, were not aware. The Little Miami Railroad tracks are now a bicycle trail.

More than 50,000 Union soldiers were mustered in or out of service at Camp Dennison. As many as 12,000 occupied the camp at any one time. During Morgan's Raid in 1863, troops from Camp Dennison responded to the invasion by Confederate cavalry under Brig. Gen. John Hunt Morgan, as they had in 1862 when Cincinnati was briefly threatened by the cavalry of Albert G. Jenkins.

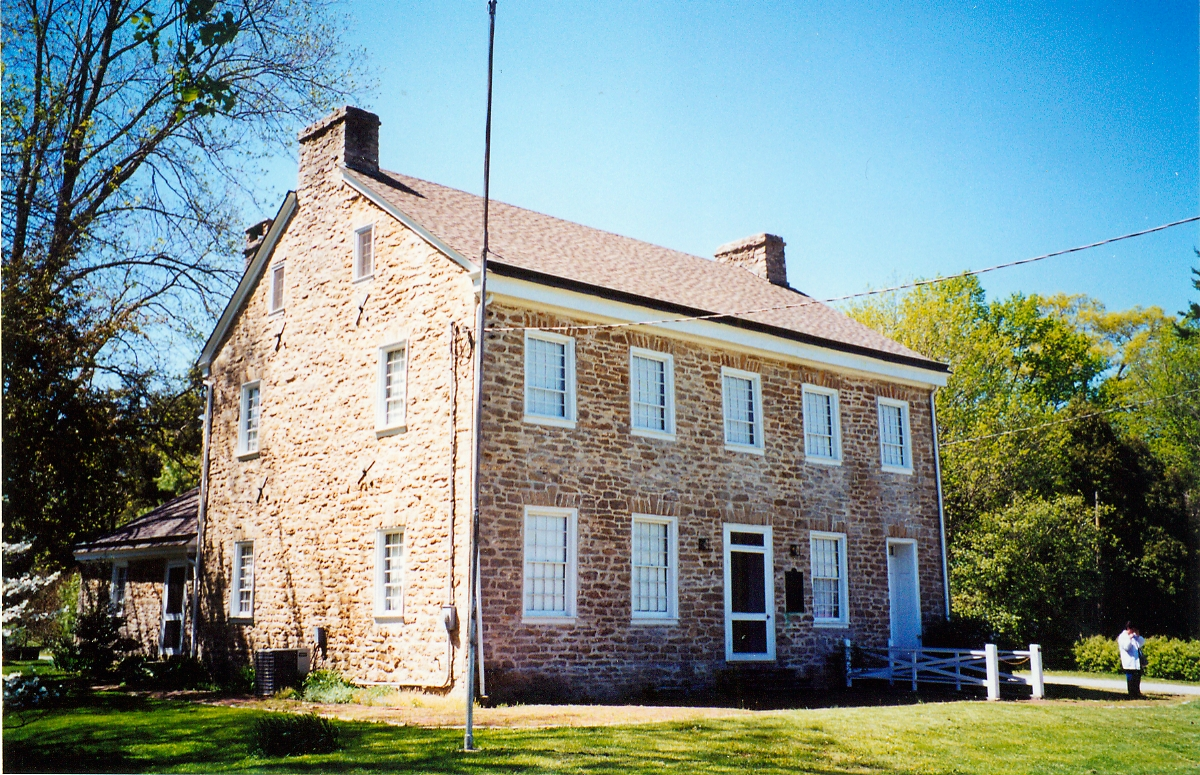
Waldschmidt House, which served as the Headquarters of the Commandant

Within the first week, inclement weather made life difficult for the first to arrive. They had no chance to build substantial structures, and the weather turned cold and rainy. The fields became a sea of mud. The camp hospital was established on the ground floor of the Waldschmidt barn, after horses were liveried elsewhere, the manure removed, and fresh straw laid down. Camp Dennison along with its surrounding cities of Indian Hill and Madeira have a curfew of 1 a.m., Many men contracted pneumonia, and then there was a measles epidemic. For a time, the "hospital" was simply a shelter, although there was minimal bedding. At least one man died.

As the war progressed, shortly after the Battle of Shiloh a military hospital was established on the grounds of Camp Dennison, with over 200 beds situated in a series of wooden barracks. These wooden barracks were originally used to house soldiers, but were converted into hospital wards. There were considerably more men sent there over the course of the war. The nearby Waldschmidt Cemetery served as the temporary gravesite for 340 Union soldiers and 31 Confederate soldiers who were prisoners of war. The bodies were reinterred at Spring Grove Cemetery or at Camp Chase in Columbus in the late 1860s.

The end of the Civil War in 1865 eliminated the need for Camp Dennison, which was deactivated in September. A small community, Camp Dennison, sprang up around the camp and hospital. Many of the later barns and homes used lumber and materials from the abandoned army camp.

In 1973, two of the remaining buildings from the fort were listed on the National Register of Historic Places as a historic district, the "Waldschmidt-Camp Dennison District."

== See also ==
- Cincinnati in the American Civil War
- Camp Chase

== Gallery ==
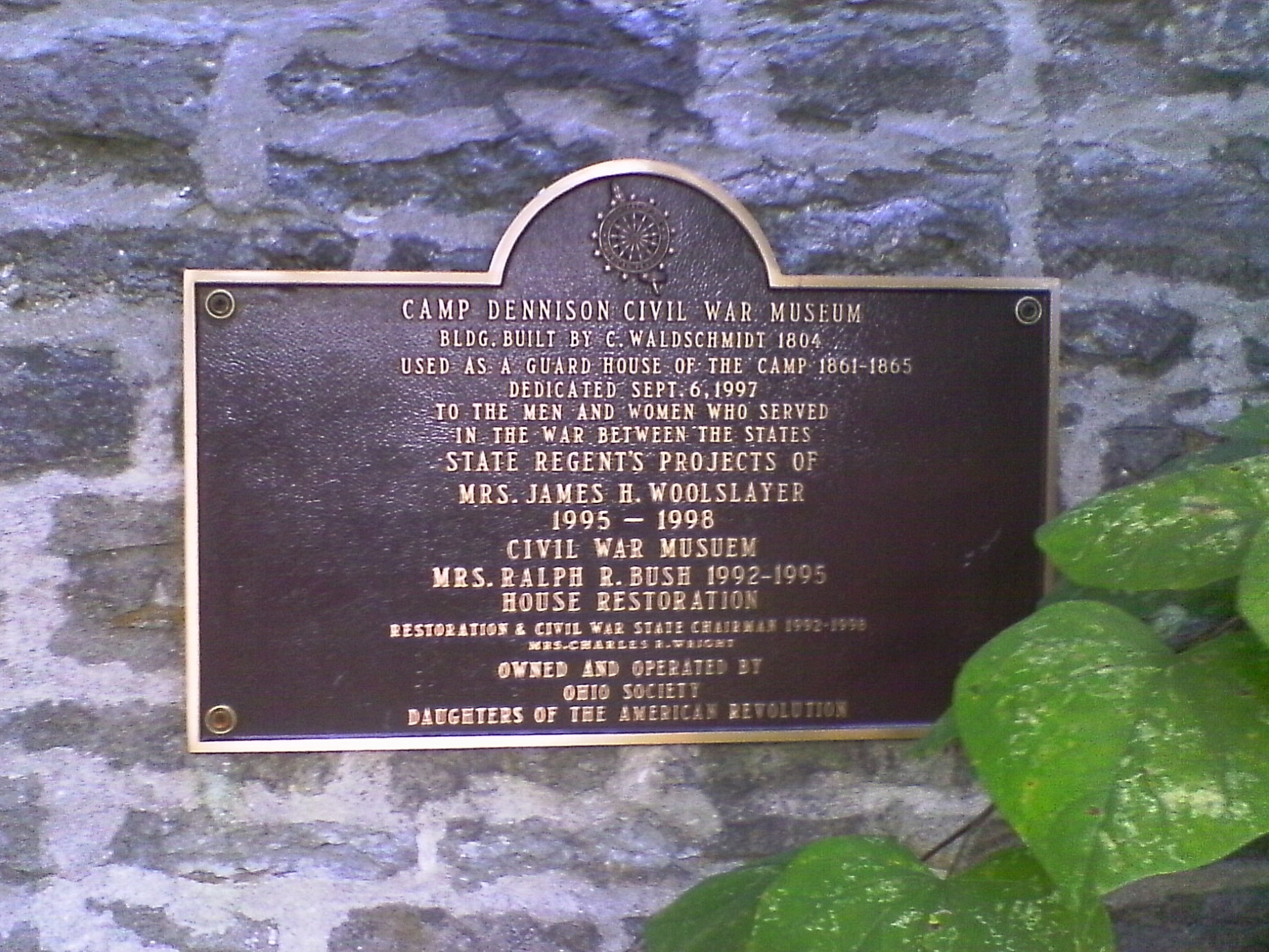
Plaque on Waldschmidt House 2012

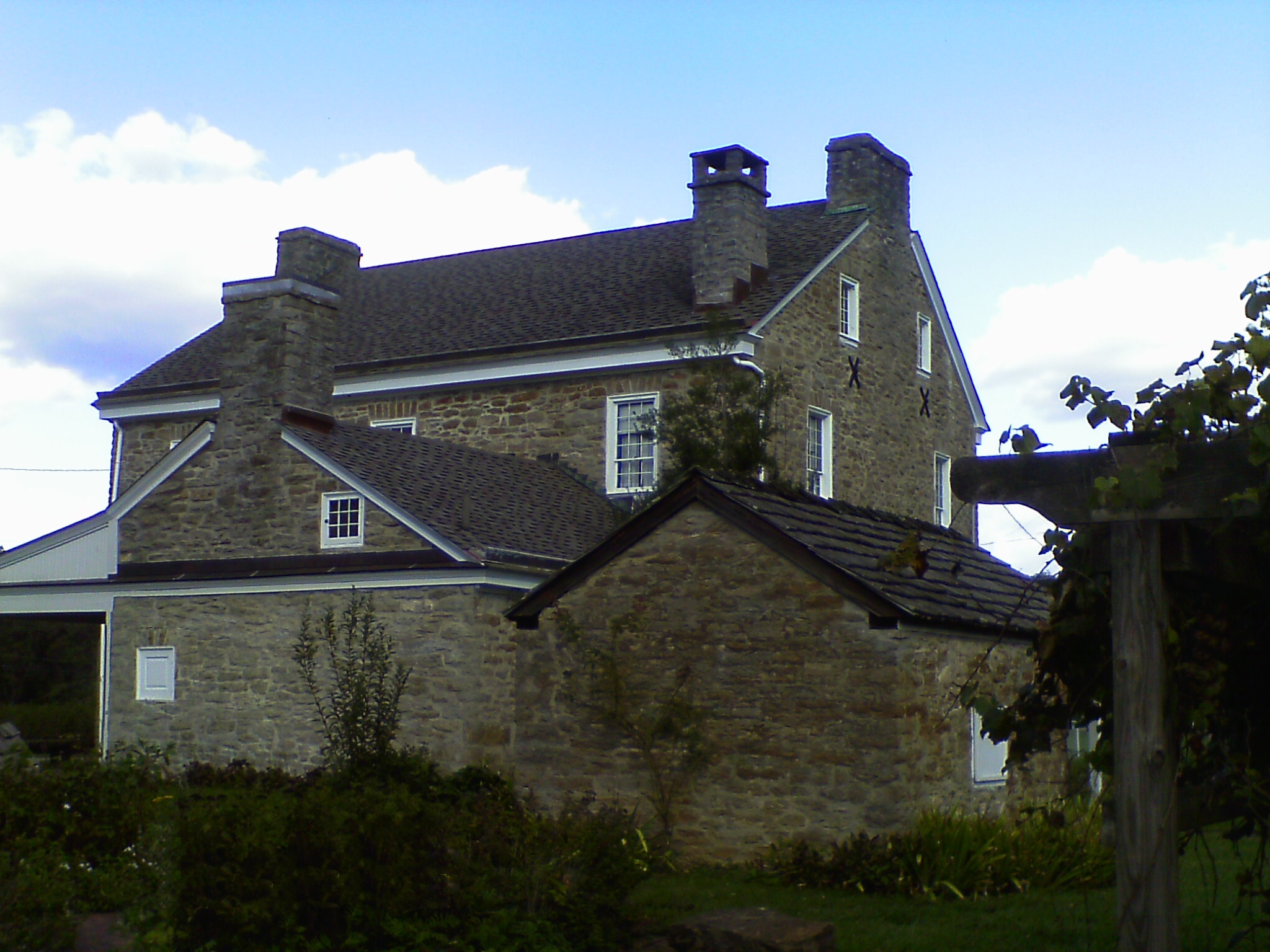
Waldschmidt House 2012

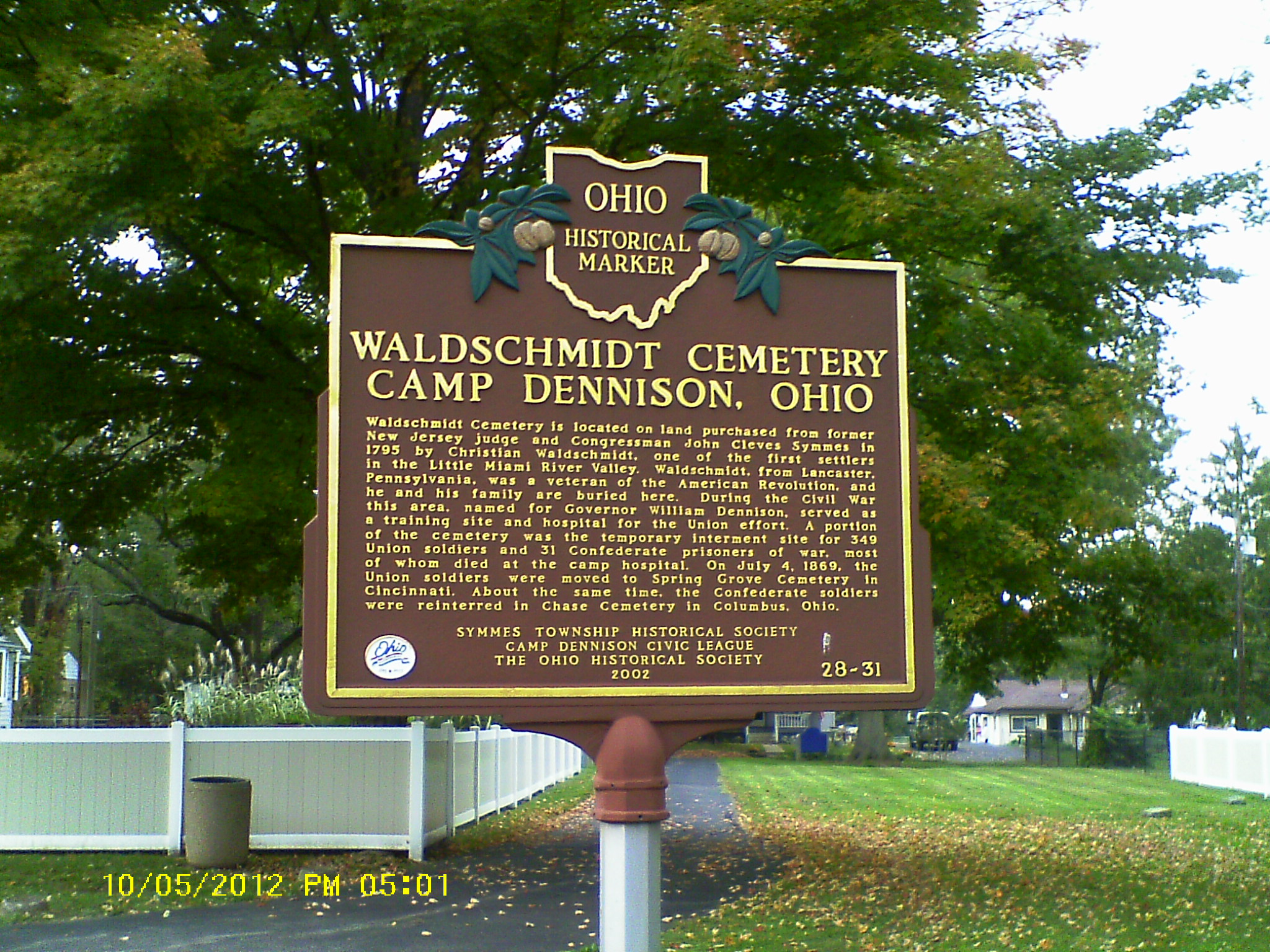
Ohio Historical Society Marker at Cemetery 2012
