= Gordon E. Pape House =

Historic house in Ohio, United States

- Gordon E. Pape House-Sunny Knolls
- U.S. National Register of Historic Places
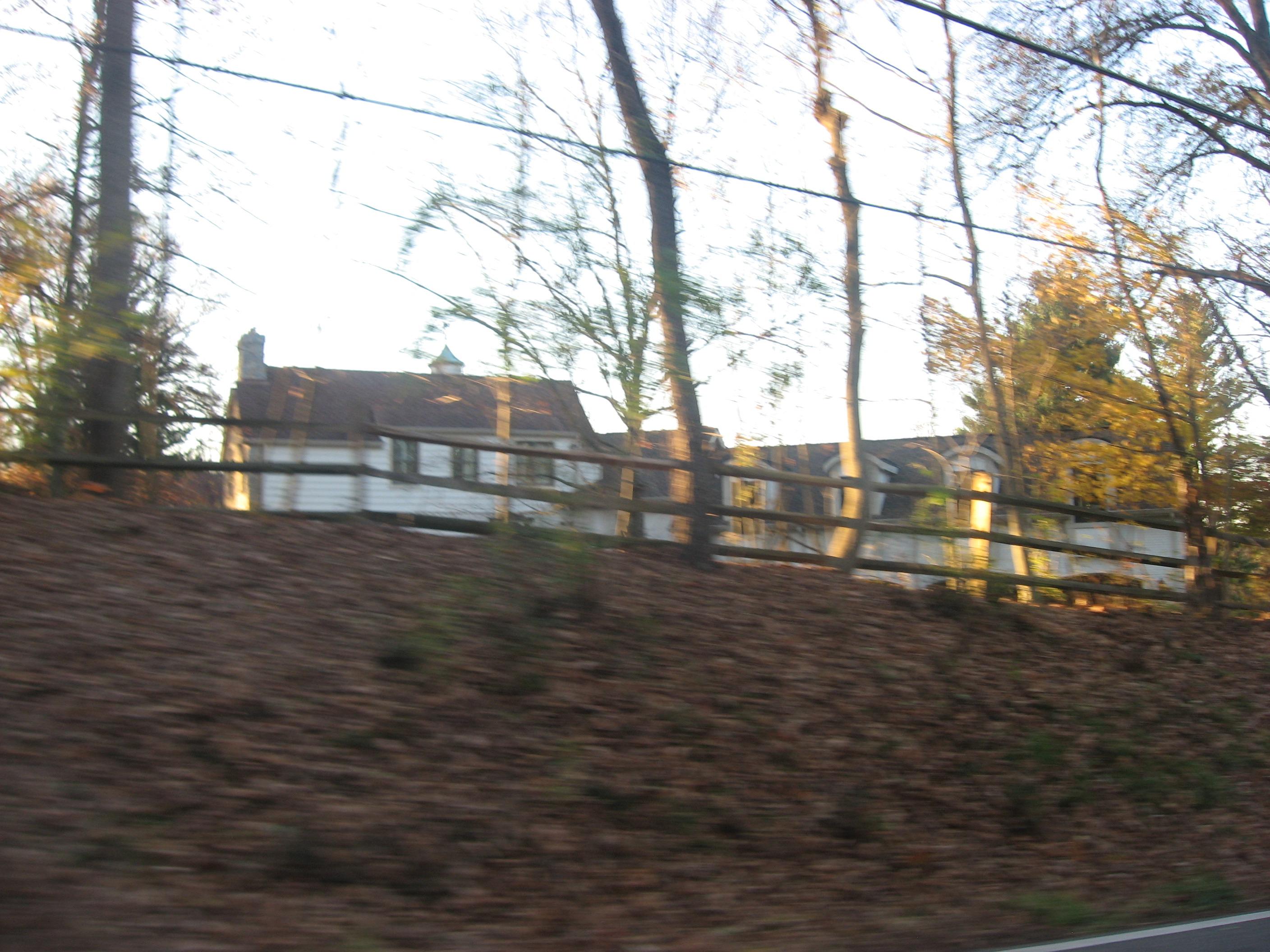
- Roadside view

- Location within Ohio
- Location: 8725 Blome Rd., Indian Hill, Ohio
- Coordinates: 39°12′58.64″N 84°20′40.11″W
- Architect: John Henri Deeken
- NRHP reference No.: 06000484
- Added to NRHP: June 9, 2006

The Gordon E. Pape House, also known as Sunny Knolls, is a historic building in Indian Hill, Ohio. It was listed in the National Register of Historic Places on June 9, 2006.

The Gordon E. Pape House is one of five sites in Indian Hill that is listed on the National Register, along with the Elliott House, the Jefferson Schoolhouse, the Methodist church, and the Washington Heights School.
