= General Wade (disambiguation) =

General Wade refers to George Wade (1673–1748), a British Army general. General Wade may also refer to:

- Ashton Wade (1898–1996), British Army major general
- David Wade (Louisiana general) (1911–1990), U.S. Air Force lieutenant general
- Horace M. Wade (1916–2001), U.S. Air Force general
- James F. Wade (1843–1921), U.S. Army major general
- Melancthon S. Wade (1801–1868), Union Army brigadier general
- Sidney S. Wade (1909–2002), U.S. Marine Corps major general

== See also ==
- Attorney General Wade (disambiguation)
