= Armstrong Chapel United Methodist Church =

Historic church in Ohio, United States

- United Methodist Church
- U.S. National Register of Historic Places
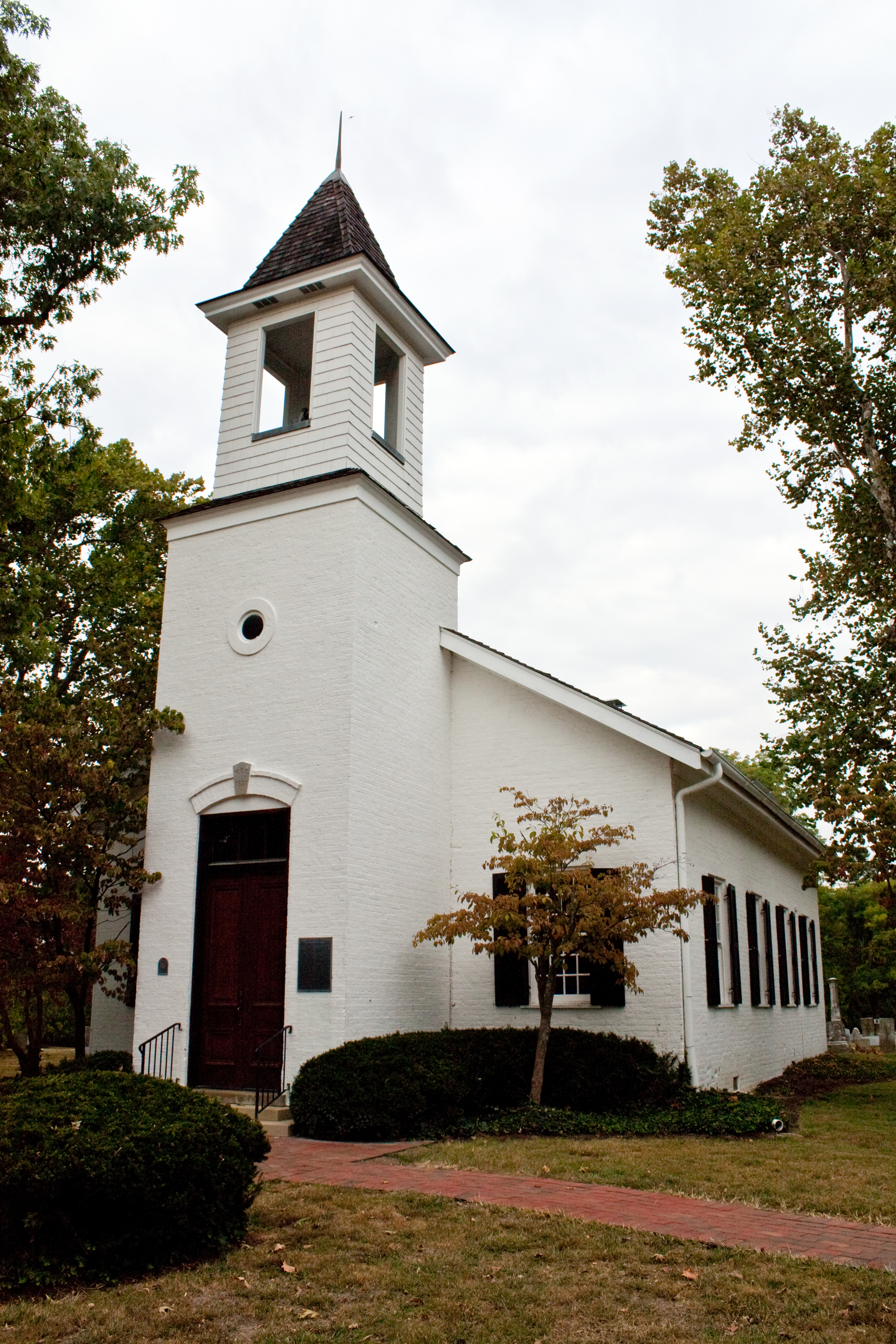
- Front of the church

- Location within Ohio Location within the United States
- Location: 5125 Drake Rd.
- Nearest city: Indian Hill, Ohio
- Coordinates: 39°9′37″N 84°20′49″W
- Area: Less than 1 acre (0.40 ha)
- Built: 1831
- Architect: Samuel Earhart
- NRHP reference No.: 75001432
- Added to NRHP: December 4, 1975

Armstrong Chapel United Methodist Church is a historic church in the city of Indian Hill, Ohio, United States. Built in 1831, it is a small rectangular building with a prominent front tower. It was designated a historic site in 1975.

Nathanial and Hannah Armstrong, formerly residents of Virginia, arrived in southwestern Ohio in 1800; they soon built a log cabin and gristmill on their land and began farming. By this time, occasional circuit-riding ministers of the Methodist Church were visiting the area, but the settlers worshipped in each others' homes because there were no church buildings nearby. As this situation continued for decades, in 1830 Armstrong donated one of the best pieces of his land for the construction of a church and cemetery.

The church was erected in the summer of 1831 under the leadership of Samuel Earhart; its walls, built of brick, were constructed from locally made bricks whose clay originated on Earhart's property. The adjacent cemetery had already been founded; its first burial was Hannah Armstrong, who had died four years before the church's completion in the fall of 1831. Nathanial Armstrong provided that the church be made available for the use of whichever denomination had the greatest number of members in the vicinity. Both at that time and at all times since, the church has been used by Methodists. Relatively few changes have been made to the building since its construction; a tower was added in 1890, but only minor repairs have been carried out otherwise. Although the foundation was built of fieldstones and held together by soil rather than mortar, it has moved only slightly; a restoration performed in the 1970s demonstrated that the building had settled just 2 inches (51 mm) in 140 years.

In late 1975, Armstrong Chapel was listed on the National Register of Historic Places by the name of "United Methodist Church." It is one of five sites in Indian Hill that is listed on the National Register, along with the Elliott House, the Jefferson Schoolhouse, the Gordon E. Pape House, and the Washington Heights School. Armstrong qualified for inclusion on the Register because of its place in local history, because of its connection to locally prominent individual Nathanial Armstrong, and because of its well-preserved historic architecture. The historic site designation encompassed the Armstrong cemetery, as well as the church building. Today, Armstrong Chapel continues as an active congregation of the United Methodist Church. As the congregation grew in the early twenty-first century, a new building was deemed necessary; a groundbreaking ceremony was held at the end of August 2009, and the new structure was substantially completed in October of the following year.
