= Juniperus mairei =

Scientific classification
- Kingdom: Plantae
- Clade: Tracheophytes
- Clade: Gymnospermae
- Division: Pinophyta
- Class: Pinopsida
- Order: Cupressales
- Family: Cupressaceae
- Genus: Juniperus
- Species: J. mairei

Binomial name
- Juniperus mairei Lemée & H.Lév.

Synonyms
- Juniperus formosana subsp. mairei (Lemée & H.Lév.) Silba; Juniperus formosana var. mairei (Lemée & H.Lév.) R.P.Adams & C.F.Hsieh

Genus of conifer

Juniperus mairei is a species of conifer native to China. It is a tree which ranges across parts of southern and north-central China to Qinghai and Tibet.

The species was first described by Albert Marie Victor Lemée and Augustin Abel Hector Léveillé in 1914. Some authorities consider it a synonym of Juniperus formosana.
