= Elliott House (Indian Hill, Ohio) =

Historic house in Ohio, United States

- U.S. National Register of Historic Places
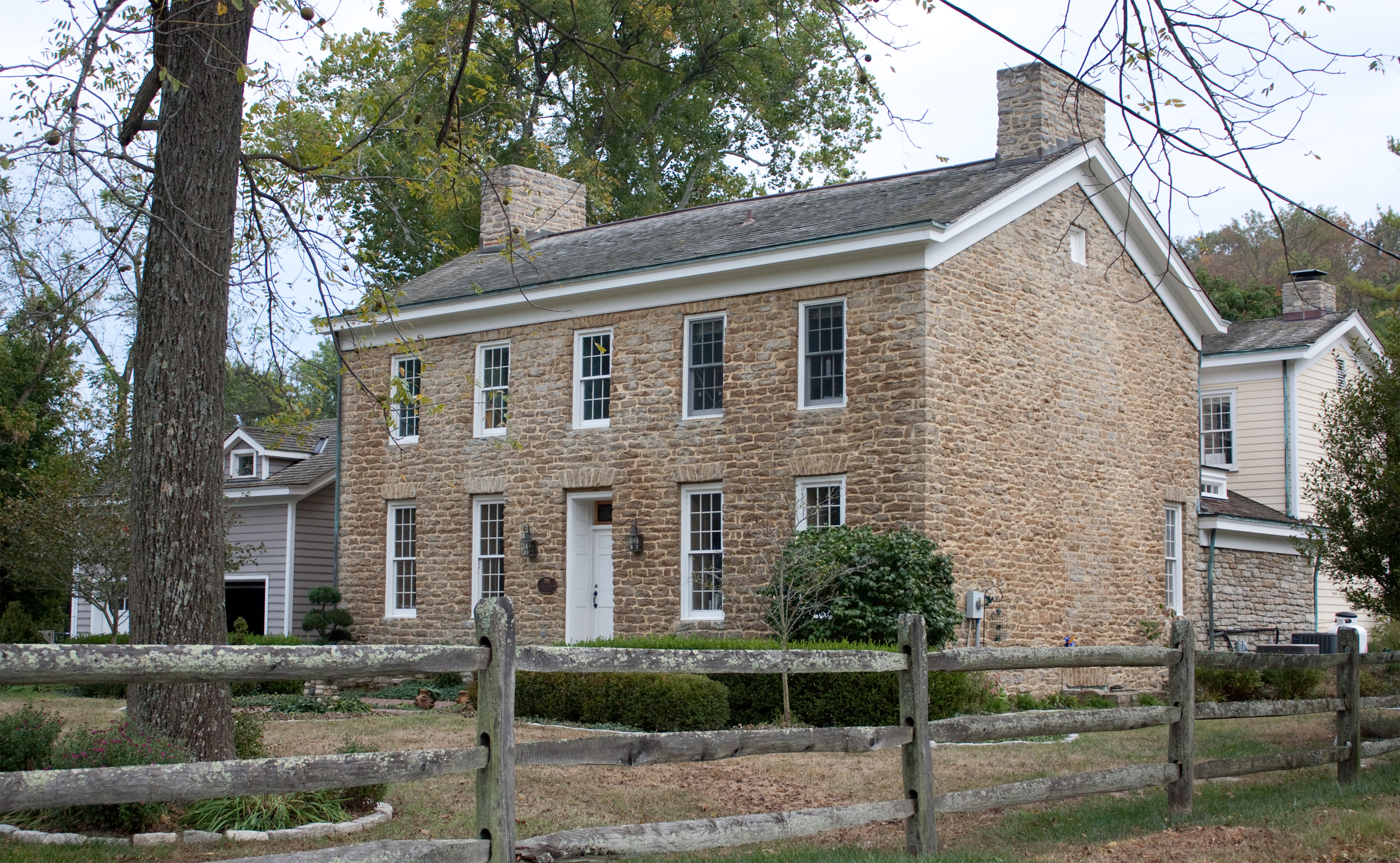
- Front and side of the house

- Location within Ohio Location within the United States
- Location: 9352 Given Rd., Indian Hill, Ohio
- Coordinates: 39°13′23″N 84°19′16″W
- Area: 0 acres (0 ha)
- Built: 1802
- NRHP reference No.: 76001451
- Added to NRHP: October 29, 1976

The Elliott House is a historic residence in the city of Indian Hill in northeastern Hamilton County, Ohio, United States. Constructed in 1802, this farmhouse once served as the hub of an industrial operation, and since that time it has been named a historic site.

Native of Ireland, John Elliott left Derry for the United States in 1784. He married Mary Miller in Pennsylvania, in 1786. They soon settled along the Little Miami River in present-day northeastern Hamilton County, Nearly twenty years later, they built the core of the present structure as a farmhouse; built of stone, it consisted of a simple rectangular floor plan with chimneys on each end. Soon after the original portion was completed, the Elliotts added a wing to the southwestern corner of the original house. Later modifications included enclosure of the rear porch, replacement of the tiny original front porch with a far larger structure, and construction of a hallway to serve the rear addition.

Having completed his house, Elliott proceeded to construct an industrial complex on his property. Following the placement of a dam on the Little Miami, he established a gristmill, a distillery, a carding mill for wool, and a sawmill on the property. Using these facilities, Elliott began to engage in business at great distances; many of his products were sold in New Orleans after transportation down the Ohio and Mississippi Rivers.

In 1898, the property was bought by a family named Sterrett, who occupied it for more than twenty years; after they sold it to Henry Livingston in 1920, he donated it to a Jewish social agency, which maintained a summer camp around the house into the 1960s. In 1967, the village of Indian Hill purchased the land; for many years, it was used as an educational center for schoolchildren, and in 1976, the Elliott House was listed on the National Register of Historic Places. It qualified for inclusion on the Register because of its place in local history, for it is one of the oldest houses in the Miami Purchase, and also because of its well-preserved historic architecture. Soon afterward, a widescale restoration effort took place: all recent additions were removed, the original elements were restored, and the surrounding property was archaeologically investigated. Finances proved insufficient for more extensive renovations, but the house was in a condition sufficient for occupation, and Indian Hill sold it to private owners in 1985.

The Elliott House is one of five sites in Indian Hill that is listed on the National Register, along with the Jefferson Schoolhouse, the Gordon E. Pape House, the Methodist church, and the Washington Heights School.
