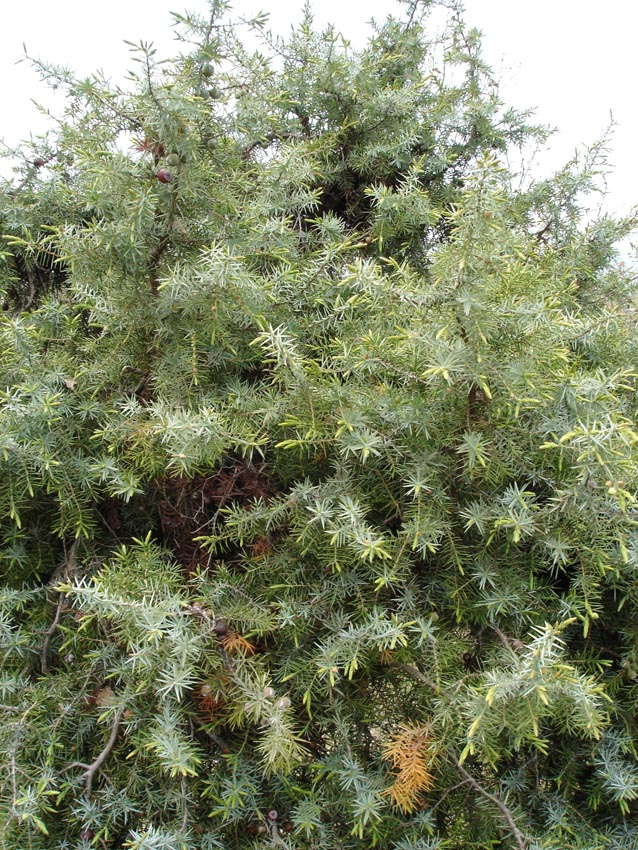
- Cade in southern France

Conservation status
- Least Concern (IUCN 3.1)

Scientific classification
- Kingdom: Plantae
- Clade: Embryophytes
- Clade: Tracheophytes
- Clade: Gymnosperms
- Division: Pinophyta
- Class: Pinopsida
- Order: Cupressales
- Family: Cupressaceae
- Genus: Juniperus
- Section: Juniperus sect. Juniperus
- Species: J. oxycedrus

Binomial name
- Juniperus oxycedrus L.
- Natural range

Synonyms
- Juniperus glauca Salisb. nom. illeg.; Juniperus heterocarpa Timb.-Lagr. ex Loret & Barrandon; Juniperus heterocarpa Timb.-Lagr. ex Nyman; Juniperus oxycedrina St.-Lag.; Juniperus rufescens Link nom. illeg.; Juniperus souliei Sennen; Juniperus tenella Antoine; Juniperus tremolsii Pau; Juniperus wittmanniana Fisch. ex Lindl. nom. inval.; Oxycedrus echinoformis Carrière; Oxycedrus ericoides Pandiani; Oxycedrus withmanniana Carrière

= Juniperus oxycedrus =

Species of plant

Juniperus oxycedrus, vernacularly called Cade, cade juniper, prickly juniper, prickly cedar, or sharp cedar, is a species of juniper, native across the Mediterranean region, growing on a variety of rocky sites from sea level. The specific epithet oxycedrus means "sharp cedar" and this species may have been the original cedar or cedrus of the ancient Greeks.

== Description ==
Juniperus oxycedrus is very variable in shape, forming a spreading shrub 2–3 metres (6 1/2–10 feet) tall to a small erect tree 10–15 m (33–49 ft) tall. It has needle-like leaves in whorls of three; the leaves are green, 5–20 millimetres (1/4–3/4 inch) long and 1–2 mm (1/32–3/32 in) broad, with a double white stomatal band (split by a green midrib) on the inner surface. It is usually dioecious, with separate male and female plants. The seed cones are berry-like, green ripening in 18 months to orange-red with a variable pink waxy coating; they are spherical, 7–12 mm (1/4–1/2 in) diameter, and have three or six fused scales in 1–2 whorls, three of the scales with a single seed. The seeds are dispersed when birds eat the cones, digesting the fleshy scales and passing the hard seeds in their droppings. The pollen cones are yellow, 2–3 mm (1/16–1/8 in) long, and fall soon after shedding their pollen in late winter or early spring.

=== Subspecies ===
As to be expected from the wide range, J. oxycedrus is very variable, and multiple subspecies have been recognised. However, multiple studies have found the subspecies not to be closely related to one another, resulting in the recognition of multiple species:

- Juniperus oxycedrus L. – Western prickly juniper. Southwest Europe, in eastern Portugal and Spain east to southern France, northwest Italy, Corsica, and Sardinia, and northwest Africa from Morocco east to Tunisia. Leaves long (10–20 mm or 3/8–13/16 in), narrow-based; cones smooth.
- Juniperus navicularis Gand. (syn. J. oxycedrus subsp. transtagana) – Portuguese prickly juniper. Coastal southwest Spain and Portugal. Leaves short (5–12 mm or 3/16–1/2 in); cones smooth.
- Juniperus deltoides R.P.Adams – Eastern prickly juniper. Central Italy east to Iran and Israel. Leaves long (10–20 mm or 3/8–13/16 in), broad-based; cones with raised scale edges.
- Juniperus macrocarpa (syn. J. oxycedrus subsp. macrocarpa) – large-fruited juniper. Mediterranean coastal sands. Broader leaves (2–3 mm or 1/16–1/8 in wide), and larger cones (12–18 mm or 1/2–11/16 in wide).

An additional variety or subspecies J. oxycedrus var. badia H.Gay (syn. J. oxycedrus subsp. badia (H.Gay) Debeaux) is distinguished on the basis of larger cones (10–13 mm or 3/8–1/2 in diameter), tinged purple when mature; it is described from northern Algeria, and also reported from Portugal and Spain.

Other close relatives of J. oxycedrus include Juniperus brevifolia on the Azores, Juniperus cedrus on the Canary Islands and Juniperus formosana in eastern Asia.

== Uses ==
Cade oil is the essential oil obtained through destructive distillation of the wood of this shrub. It is a dark, aromatic oil with a strong smoky smell which is used in some cosmetics and (traditional) skin treatment drugs, as well as incense. Cade oil has, on rare occasions, caused severe allergic reactions in infants.

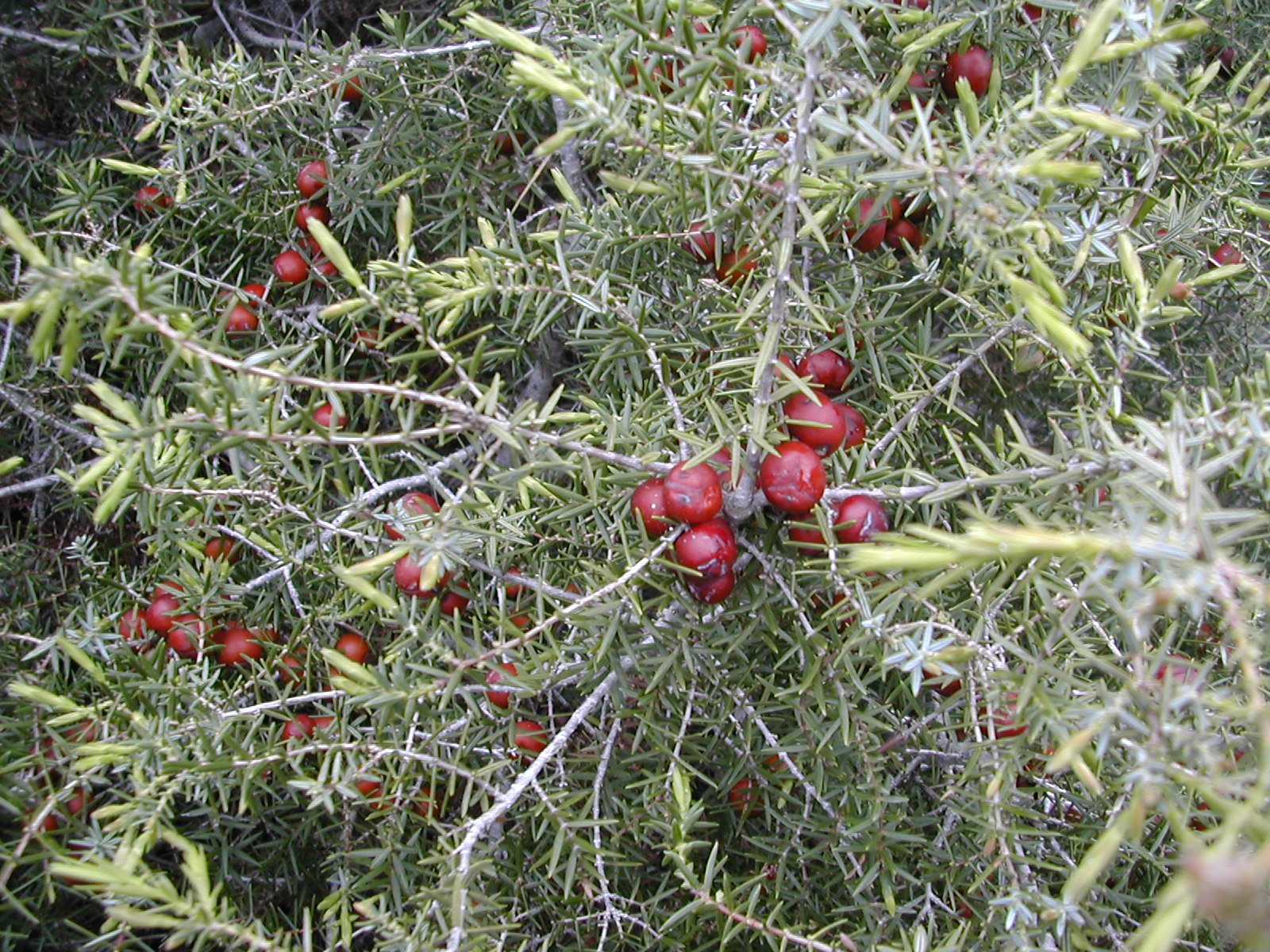
Leaves and mature cones, Spain

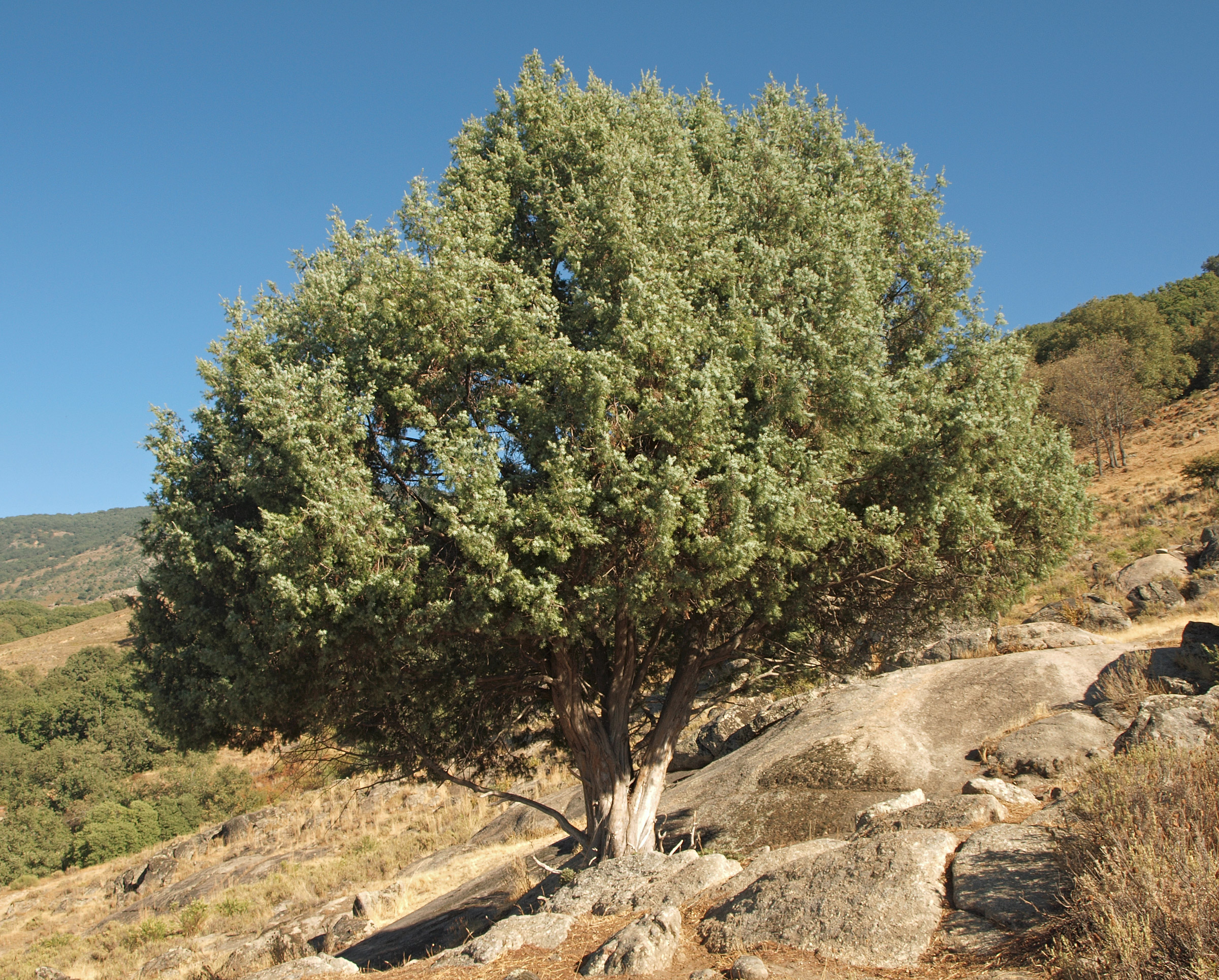
Central Spain

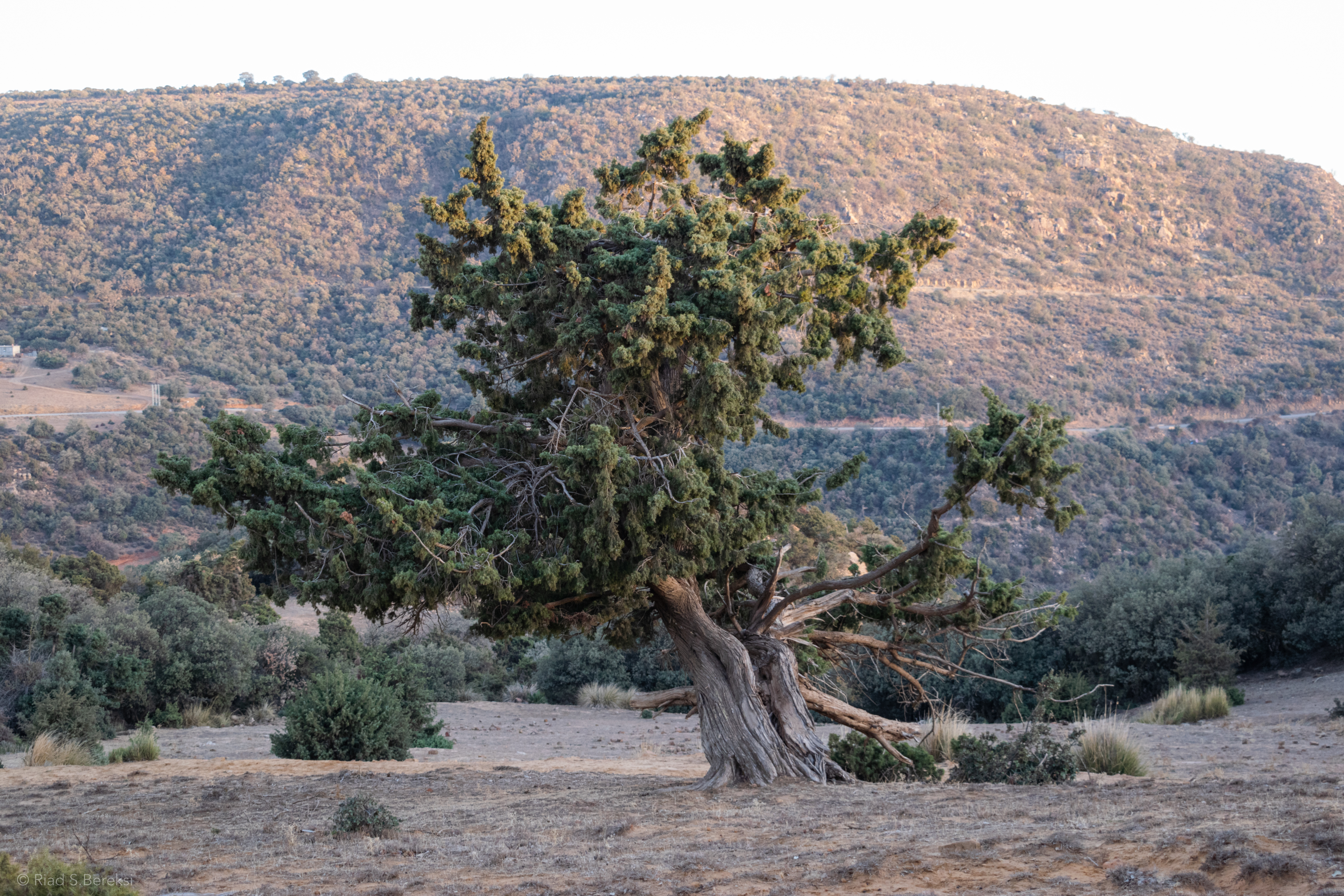
Tlemcen, Algeria

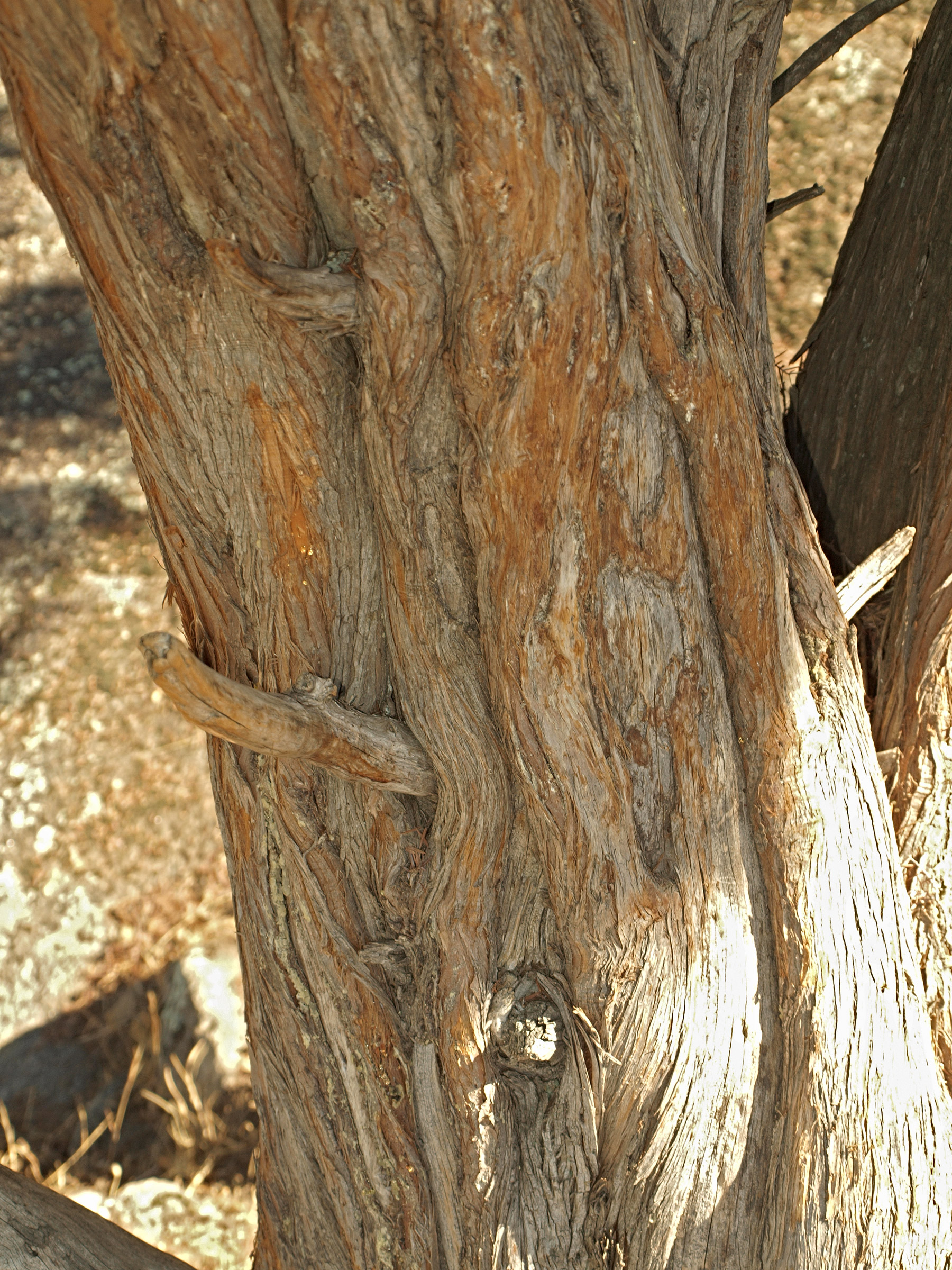
Bark, Central Spain

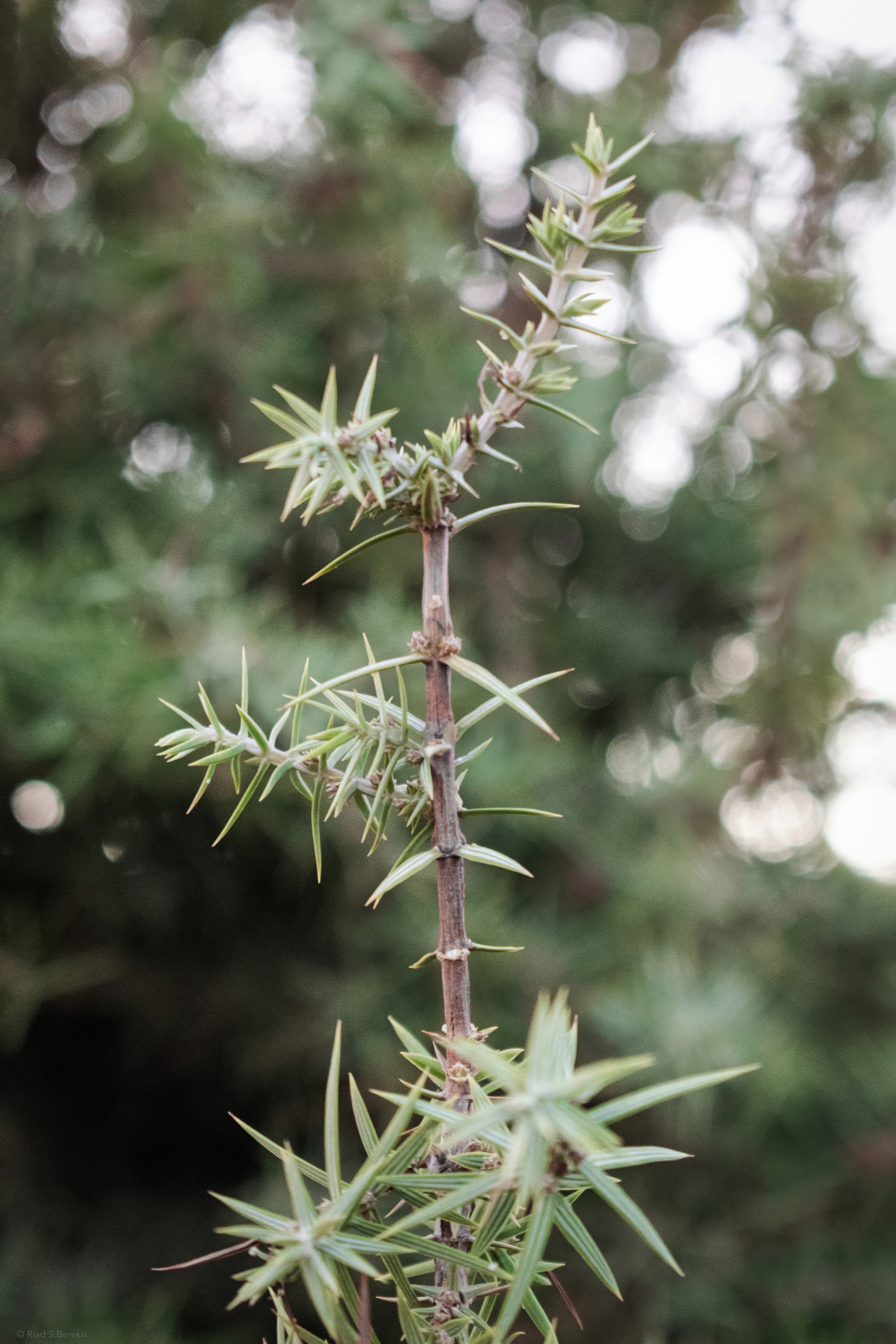
Leaves, Tlemcen, Algeria

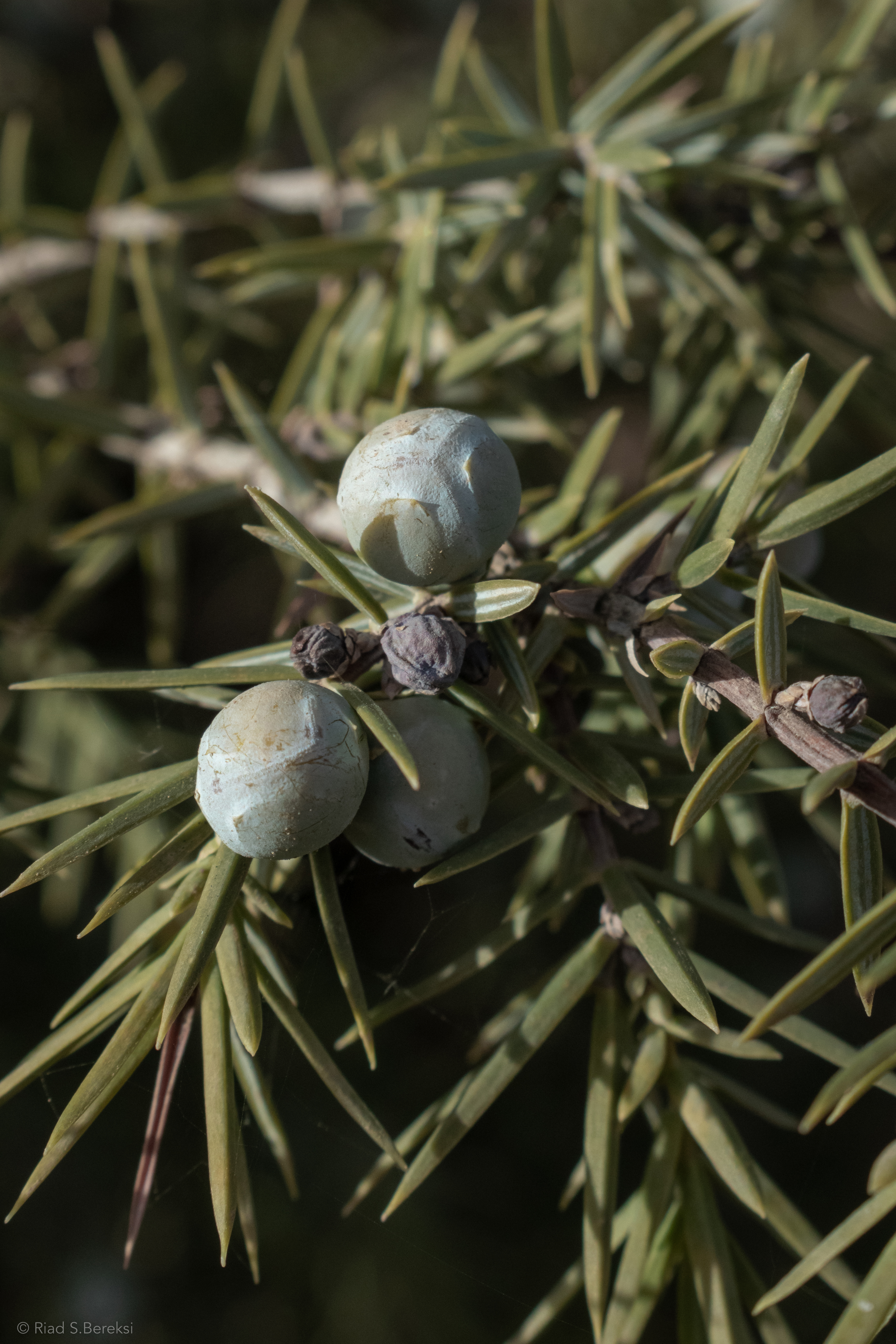
Leaves and immature cones, Tlemcen, Algeria

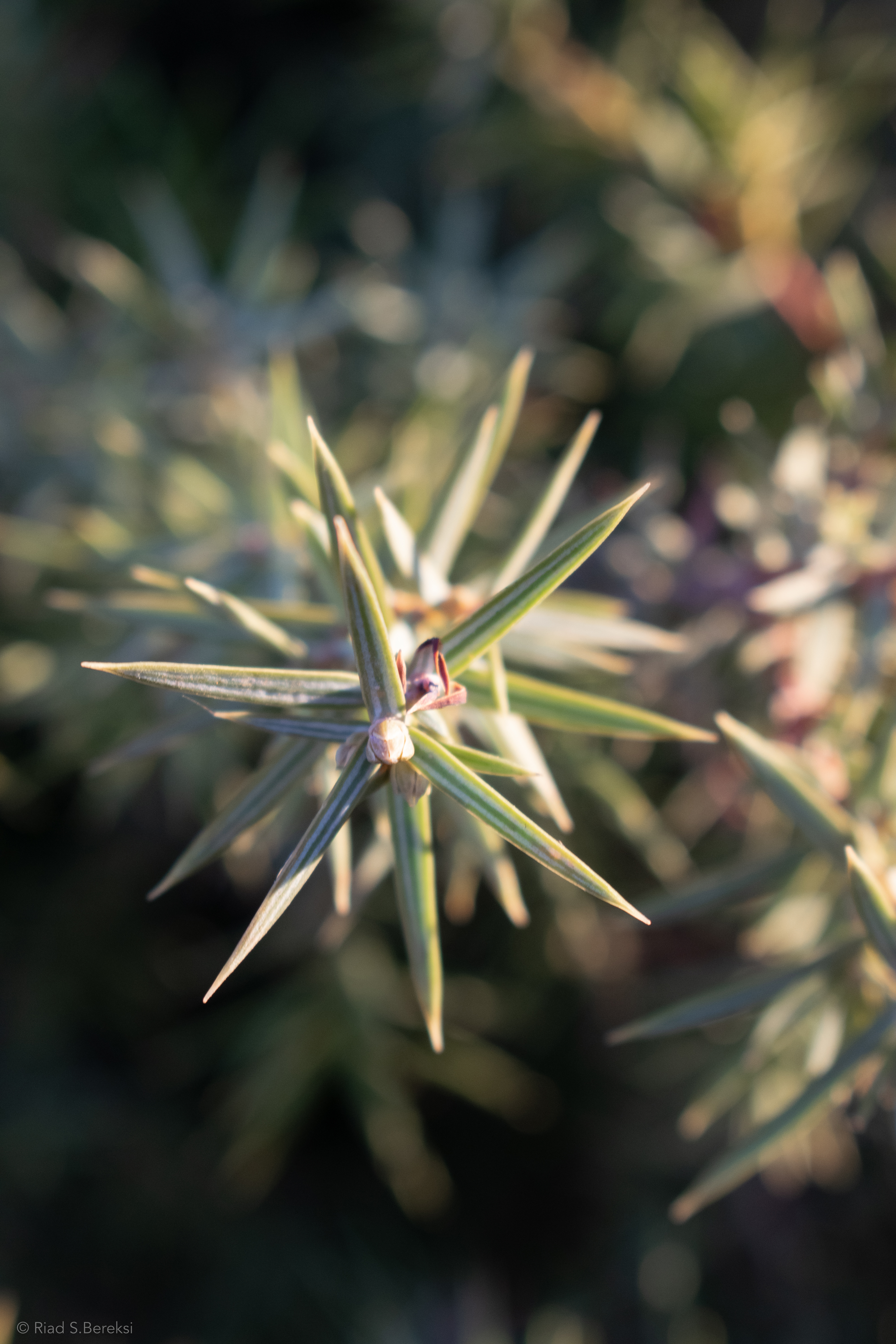
Leaves, Tlemcen. Algeria

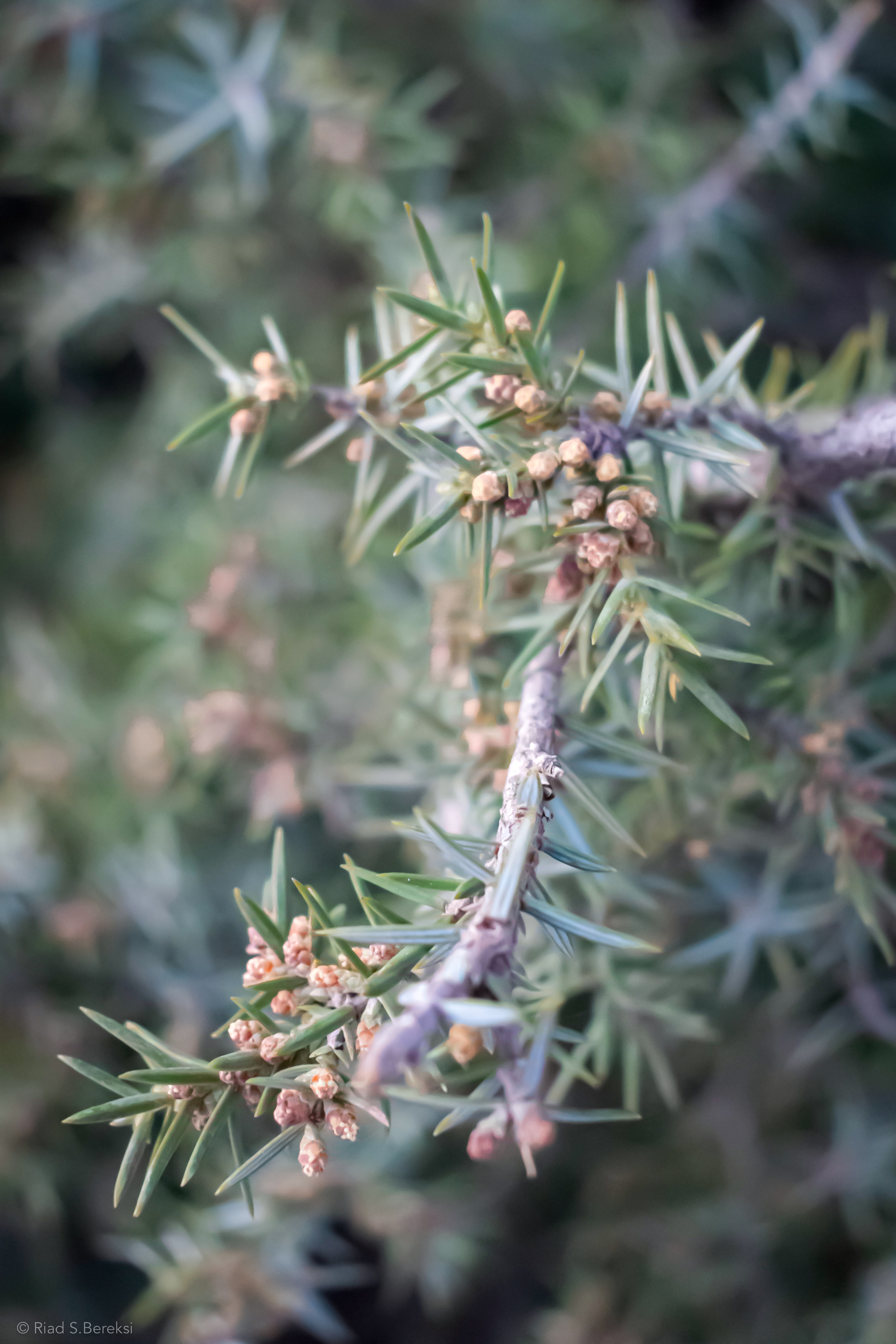
Juniperus oxycedrus, Lalla Setti
