= Symmes Township, Hamilton County, Ohio =

Township in Ohio, US

- Township
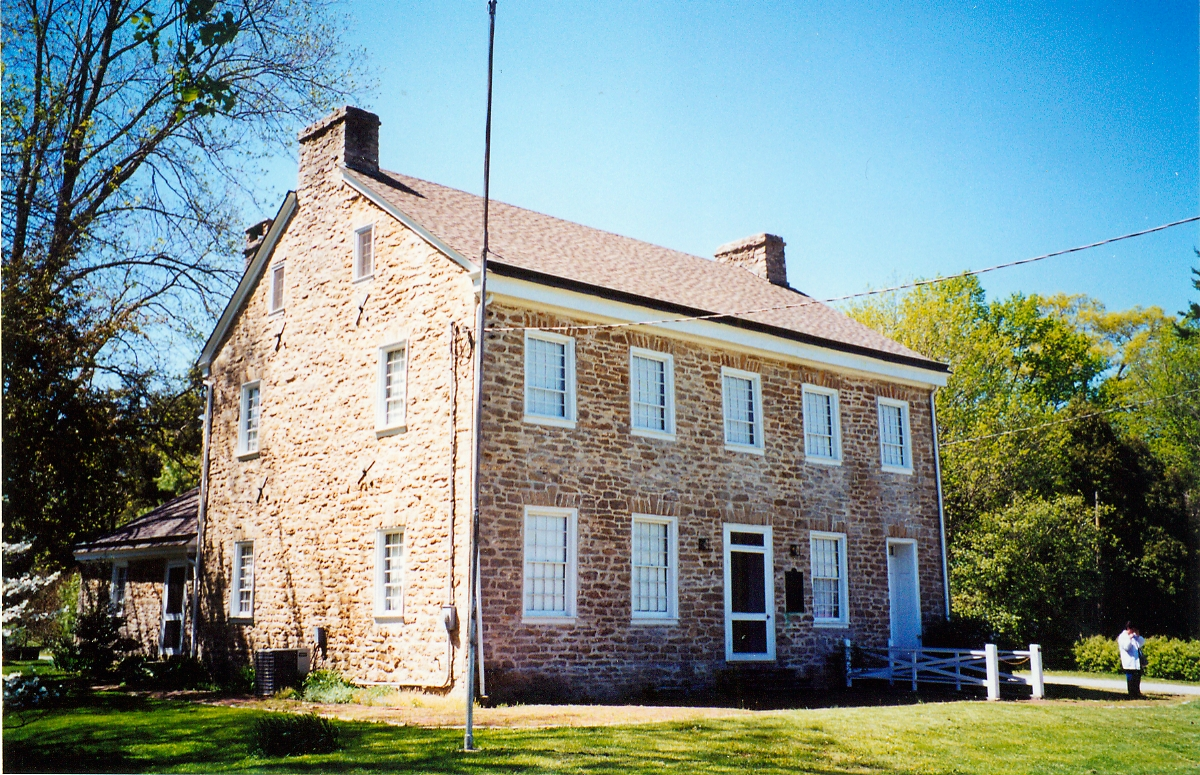
- Waldschmidt House at Camp Dennison

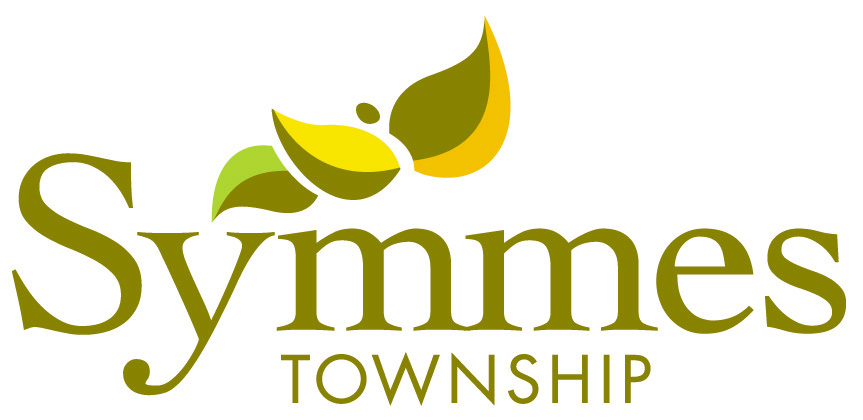

- Location in Hamilton County and the state of Ohio.
- Coordinates: 39°15′18″N 84°18′5″W
- Country: United States
- State: Ohio
- County: Hamilton
- Incorporated: January 19, 1822
- ?: 1824

Area
  - Total: 8.6 sq mi (22.4 km^{2})
  - Land: 8.4 sq mi (21.8 km^{2})
  - Water: 0.23 sq mi (0.6 km^{2})
- Elevation: 735 ft (224 m)

Population (2020)
  - Total: 15,642
  - Density: 1,858.4/sq mi (717.52/km^{2})
- Time zone: UTC-5 (Eastern (EST))
  - Summer (DST): UTC-4 (EDT)
- ZIP code: 45249
- Area code: 513
- FIPS code: 39-76028
- GNIS feature ID: 1086232
- Website: www.symmestownship.org

Symmes Township (/ˈsɪmz/ SIMZ) is one of the twelve townships of Hamilton County, Ohio, United States. The population was 15,642 as of the 2020 census.

== History ==
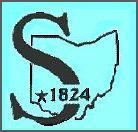
Former Symmes Township logo

Symmes Township is located in what was originally the Symmes Purchase. The township was incorporated by an act of the General Assembly on January 19, 1822. However, its year of establishment is usually given as 1824, as seen in the township's previous logo. In 1853, the Little Miami Railroad was completed, connecting the township to Cincinnati. Symmes Township survived a 1994 attempt to merge with Loveland, as well as efforts the following year to incorporate most of Symmes and Deerfield Townships as the City of Heritage.

=== Name ===
Named for John Cleves Symmes, it is one of two Symmes Townships statewide; the other Symmes Township is located in Lawrence County.

== Geography ==
Located in the northeastern corner of the county, the township has been cut into two "islands" due to annexations by surrounding cities. They have the following borders:

=== The northern island ===
- Deerfield Township, Warren County – north
- Hamilton Township, Warren County – northeast
- Loveland – east
- Miami Township, Clermont County – southeast
- Indian Hill – south
- Montgomery – southwest
- Sycamore Township – west

=== The southern island ===
- Miami Township, Clermont County – north and east
- Columbia Township – south
- Indian Hill – west

=== Unincorporated communities ===
The cities of Indian Hill, Loveland, and Montgomery have annexed large portions of Symmes Township, especially Indian Hill. The following census-designated places (unincorporated communities) are in the township:

- Camp Dennison, in the southern part of the township
- Loveland Park, in the northeastern corner, extending north into Warren County
- Remington, in the southern tip of the northern "island"
- Sixteen Mile Stand, in the western portion of the northern "island"

== Demographics ==
Historical population
Census	Pop.	Note	%±
1850	1,115		—
1860	1,107		−0.7%
1870	1,377		24.4%
1880	1,626		18.1%
1890	1,649		1.4%
1900	1,547		−6.2%
1910	1,789		15.6%
1920	1,519		−15.1%
1930	2,142		41.0%
1940	2,689		25.5%
1950	3,202		19.1%
1960	7,621		138.0%
1970	9,697		27.2%
1980	7,566		−22.0%
1990	11,769		55.6%
2000	14,771		25.5%
2010	14,683		−0.6%
2020	15,642		6.5%

=== 2020 census ===
As of the census of 2020, there were 15,642 people living in the township, for a population density of 1,858.4 people per square mile (717.5/km^{2}). There were 6,001 housing units. The racial makeup of the township was 72.4% White, 4.8% Black or African American, 0.1% Native American, 14.1% Asian, 0.0% Pacific Islander, 1.0% from some other race, and 7.5% from two or more races. 4.5% of the population were Hispanic or Latino of any race.

There were 5,663 households, out of which 38.2% had children under the age of 18 living with them, 68.7% were married couples living together, 11.7% had a male householder with no spouse present, and 14.6% had a female householder with no spouse present. 18.9% of all households were made up of individuals, and 6.8% were someone living alone who was 65 years of age or older. The average household size was 2.73, and the average family size was 3.19.

28.3% of the township's population were under the age of 18, 55.4% were 18 to 64, and 16.3% were 65 years of age or older. The median age was 39.8. For every 100 females, there were 98.9 males.

According to the U.S. Census American Community Survey, for the period 2016-2020 the estimated median annual income for a household in the township was $133,344, and the median income for a family was $168,254. About 2.8% of the population were living below the poverty line, including 1.7% of those under age 18 and 1.9% of those age 65 or over. About 68.1% of the population were employed, and 71.6% had a bachelor's degree or higher.

== Government ==
The township is governed by a three-member board of trustees, who are elected in November of odd-numbered years to a four-year term beginning on the following January 1. Two are elected in the year after the presidential election and one is elected in the year before it. There is also an elected township fiscal officer, who serves a four-year term beginning on April 1 of the year after the election, which is held in November of the year before the presidential election. Vacancies in the fiscal officership or on the board of trustees are filled by the remaining trustees.

Police and fire protection in Symmes Township are the responsibility of the Hamilton County Sheriff and the Loveland-Symmes Fire Department respectively.

== Parks ==
Symmes Township has 10 parks: Symmes Park, Home of the Brave Park, Hopewell Meadows Park, Stonebridge Park, Shore Drive Park, Seven Gables Park, Meade Historic Preserve, Little Miami Scenic Trail, Camp Dennison Nature Trail, and Blong Memorial Park.

== Education ==
Three different school districts include parts of the township:

- The Indian Hill Exempted Village School District serves the southern part of the township.
- The Loveland City School District serves the northeastern part of the township
- The Sycamore Community School District serves the western part of the township.

Many private schools are located near Symmes Township as well, including Cincinnati Country Day School, Cincinnati Hills Christian Academy, Archbishop Moeller High School, Ursuline Academy, St. Margaret of York Elementary School, and St. Columban School.

The township is also served by a branch of the Public Library of Cincinnati and Hamilton County.
