= Indian Hill High School =

Location
- 6865 Drake Road; Indian Hill, (Hamilton County), Ohio 45243; United States; 39°11′11″N 84°20′50″W

Information
- Type: Public high school
- Established: 1936
- School district: Indian Hill Exempted Village School District
- Superintendent: Melissa Stewart
- School code: 361020
- Principal: Andy Gruber
- Teaching staff: 48.97 (FTE)
- Grades: 9-12
- Student to teacher ratio: 13.46
- Campus: Suburban
- Colors: Red and White
- Athletics conference: Cincinnati Hills League
- Mascot: Braves
- Team name: Braves
- Rival: Wyoming High School
- Accreditation: North Central Association of Colleges and Schools
- USNWR ranking: 175th in National Ranking, 8th in Ohio (2017)
- Newspaper: The Hill
- Yearbook: The Legend
- Website: indianhillschools.org/hs.aspx

Indian Hill High School is a public high school near Cincinnati, Ohio. It is the only public high school in the Indian Hill Exempted Village School District.

== Athletics ==
=== Ohio High School Athletic Association State Championships ===
- Boys Soccer – 2024
- Boys Swimming - 2020
- Girls Track - 2019
- Girls Soccer - 2017, 2018, 2026
- Girls Lacrosse - 2017

== Notable alumni ==
- Michael Gruber, Broadway actor
- Paul Hackett, Democratic politician, Iraqi War Veteran
- Julie Hagerty, actress and former model
- Chris Kempczinski, CEO of McDonald's
- Tom Tsuchiya, artist
