= Attorney General Wade =

Attorney General Wade may refer to:

- Charles Wade (1863–1922), Attorney General of New South Wales
- Jan Wade (born 1937), Attorney-General of Victoria

== See also ==
- General Wade (disambiguation)
