= Jefferson Schoolhouse =

- U.S. National Register of Historic Places
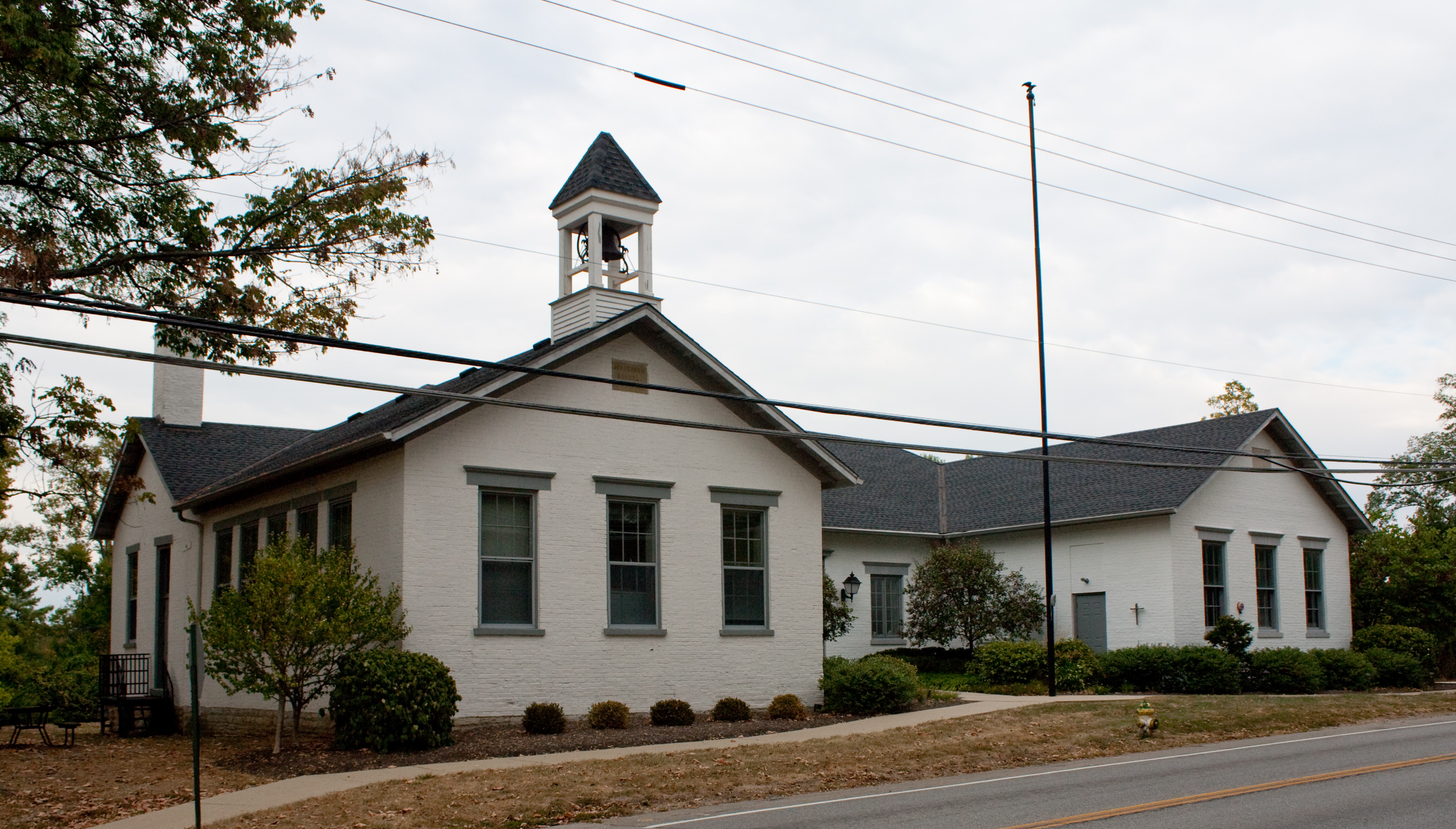
- Front of the school

- Location within Ohio Location within the United States
- Location: Indian Hill and Drake Rds., Indian Hill, Ohio
- Coordinates: 39°9′40″N 84°20′49″W
- Area: Less than 1 acre (0.40 ha)
- Built: 1851
- NRHP reference No.: 76001450
- Added to NRHP: March 17, 1976

The Jefferson Schoolhouse is a historic one-room school in the Village of Indian Hill, Ohio, United States. Built along Drake Road in 1851, it is Indian Hill's oldest extant school. Three early schools, known as the Franklin, Jefferson, and Washington Schools, were established within the bounds of the modern community, but only the Jefferson School remains to the present day.

Built of brick on a stone foundation, the Jefferson Schoolhouse is a single-story building that was built in rectangular shape and covered with a shallow gabled roof. It was expanded circa 1900 by the addition of an ell with an additional room. Having become a two-room school, it was no longer used by all eight grades of students together: grades one through four met in one room, and grades five through eight in the other. As the area continued to grow, the two rooms again became too small, and another addition was constructed in 1926 that again doubled the building's size. Despite this expansion, the 1940s saw the old Jefferson Schoolhouse become superfluous for educational purposes; as a result, it was closed and converted into a community center for the area.

After some years as the Armstrong Community Building, the former Jefferson Schoolhouse was purchased by the Armstrong Chapel United Methodist Church, whose original church building lies across Drake Road from the school. In 1976, the old school was listed on the National Register of Historic Places, one year after Armstrong Chapel received a similar distinction. It qualified for inclusion on the Register both because of its significant place in local history and because of its well-preserved historic architecture. The school is one of five Indian Hill locations on the Register, along with Armstrong Chapel, the Elliott House, the Gordon E. Pape House, and the Washington Heights School.
