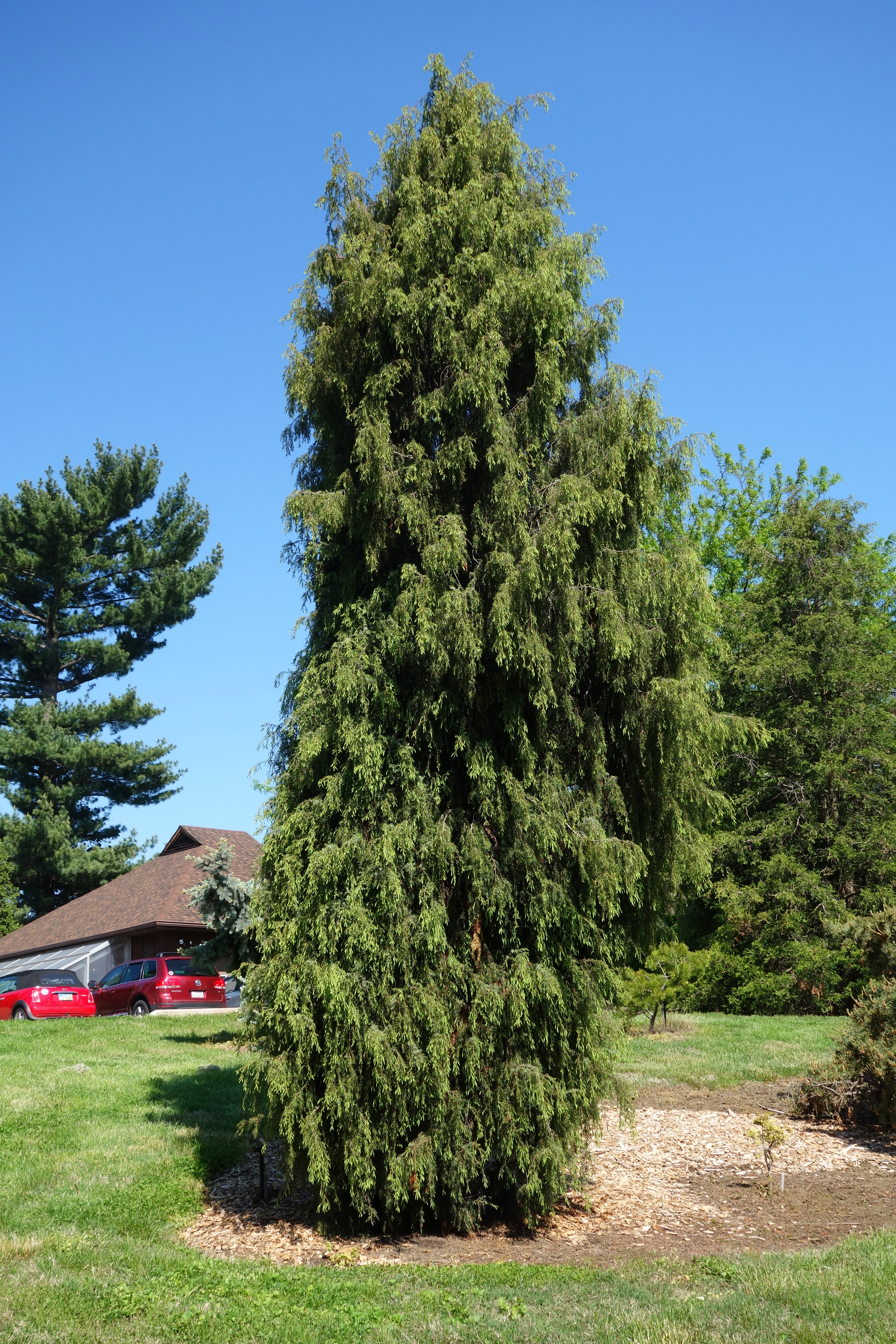
- Specimen in the Stanley M. Rowe Arboretum

Conservation status
- Least Concern (IUCN 3.1)

Scientific classification
- Kingdom: Plantae
- Clade: Tracheophytes
- Clade: Gymnospermae
- Division: Pinophyta
- Class: Pinopsida
- Order: Cupressales
- Family: Cupressaceae
- Genus: Juniperus
- Section: Juniperus sect. Juniperus
- Species: J. formosana

Binomial name
- Juniperus formosana Hayata

Synonyms
- Juniperus chekiangensis Nakai, pro syn.; Juniperus formosana var. concolor Hayata; Juniperus formosana var. sinica Nakai; Juniperus formosana f. tenella Hand.-Mazz.

= Juniperus formosana =

Species of conifer

Juniperus formosana, the Formosan juniper, is a species of conifer in the family Cupressaceae. It is a shrub or tree to 15 metres (49 feet) tall. It is native to Fujian and Taiwan. Some authorities consider Juniperus mairei a synonym, which ranges across southern and north-central China to Tibet and Qinghai.
