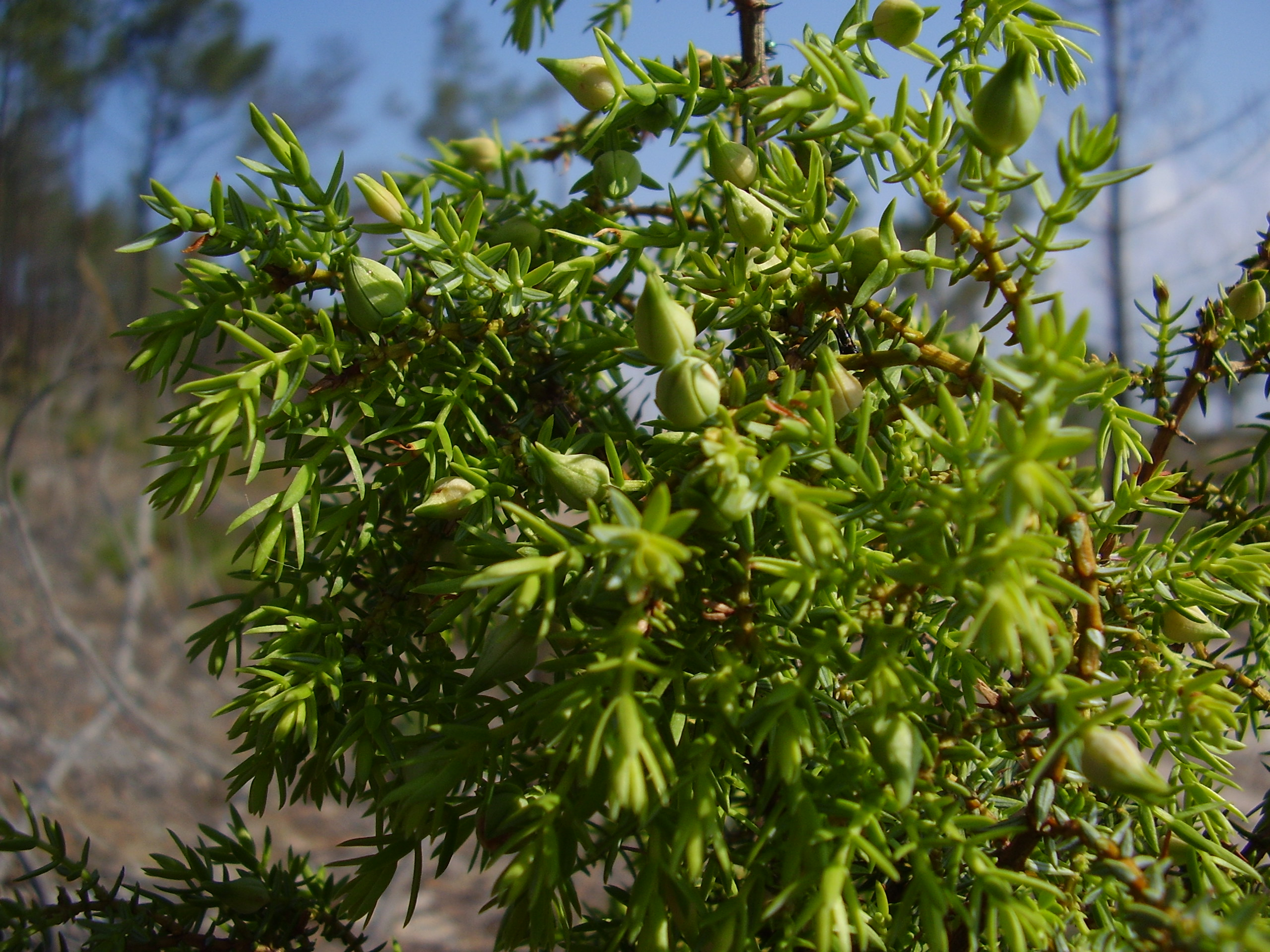
- in Melides, Portugal

Conservation status
- Near Threatened (IUCN 3.1)

Scientific classification
- Kingdom: Plantae
- Clade: Tracheophytes
- Clade: Gymnospermae
- Division: Pinophyta
- Class: Pinopsida
- Order: Cupressales
- Family: Cupressaceae
- Genus: Juniperus
- Section: Juniperus sect. Juniperus
- Species: J. navicularis

Binomial name
- Juniperus navicularis Gand.

Synonyms
- Juniperus oxycedrus subsp. transtagana Franco; Juniperus oxycedrus var. transtagna (Franco) Silba orth. error; Juniperus oxycedrus var. transtagana (Franco) Silba

= Juniperus navicularis =

Species of plant

Juniperus navicularis (syn. Juniperus oxycedrus subsp. transtagana), the Portuguese prickly juniper, is a species of juniper endemic to the southwestern Iberian Peninsula. Although it is sometimes considered a subspecies of the Mediterranean Juniperus oxycedrus, phylogenetic studies have found the two are not closely related.
