= Sixteen Mile Stand, Ohio =

- Census-designated place
- Location in Hamilton County and the state of Ohio
- Coordinates: 39°16′30″N 84°19′36″W
- Country: United States
- State: Ohio
- County: Hamilton

Area
  - Total: 1.12 sq mi (2.89 km^{2})
  - Land: 1.11 sq mi (2.88 km^{2})
  - Water: 0 sq mi (0.00 km^{2})
- Elevation: 801 ft (244 m)

Population (2020)
  - Total: 3,091
  - Density: 2,776.1/sq mi (1,071.86/km^{2})
- Time zone: UTC-5 (Eastern (EST))
  - Summer (DST): UTC-4 (EDT)
- FIPS code: 39-72620
- GNIS feature ID: 2585527

Sixteen Mile Stand is a census-designated place (CDP) in Symmes Township, Hamilton County, Ohio, United States, 19 miles (31 km) northeast of downtown Cincinnati. The population of Sixteen Mile Stand was 3,091 at the 2020 census.

== History ==
Sixteen Mile Stand takes its name from the distance to Cincinnati via the Montgomery Pike.

== Geography ==
Sixteen Mile Stand is located along U.S. Route 22 (Montgomery Road). The city of Montgomery is directly to the south.

According to the United States Census Bureau, the CDP has a total area of 1.1 square miles (2.9 km^{2}), all land.

== Demographics ==
Historical population
Census	Pop.	Note	%±
2020	3,091		—
U.S. Decennial Census

=== 2020 census ===
As of the 2020 census, Sixteen Mile Stand had a population of 3,091. The median age was 37.8 years. 24.1% of residents were under the age of 18 and 15.5% of residents were 65 years of age or older. For every 100 females there were 100.3 males, and for every 100 females age 18 and over there were 101.9 males age 18 and over.

The population density was 2,777.18 inhabitants per square mile (1,071.86/km^{2}).

100.0% of residents lived in urban areas, while 0.0% lived in rural areas.

There were 1,252 households in Sixteen Mile Stand, of which 31.9% had children under the age of 18 living in them. Of all households, 56.8% were married-couple households, 18.1% were households with a male householder and no spouse or partner present, and 20.6% were households with a female householder and no spouse or partner present. About 25.2% of all households were made up of individuals and 7.5% had someone living alone who was 65 years of age or older. The average household size was 2.52, and the average family size was 3.06.

There were 1,385 housing units, of which 9.6% were vacant. The homeowner vacancy rate was 1.3% and the rental vacancy rate was 15.3%.

Racial composition as of the 2020 census
Race	Number	Percent
White	2,040	66.0%
Black or African American	165	5.3%
American Indian and Alaska Native	2	0.1%
Asian	642	20.8%
Native Hawaiian and Other Pacific Islander	0	0.0%
Some other race	39	1.3%
Two or more races	203	6.6%
Hispanic or Latino (of any race)	145	4.7%

=== Income and poverty ===
According to the U.S. Census American Community Survey, for the period 2016-2020 the estimated median annual income for a household in the CDP was $109,142, and the median income for a family was $168,484. About 3.8% of the population were living below the poverty line, including 2.1% of those under age 18 and 2.2% of those age 65 or over. About 73.6% of the population were employed, and 83.9% had a bachelor's degree or higher.
