= Albert Marie Victor Lemée =

French naturalist (1872–1961)

- Born: August 22, 1872; Châteauneuf-d'Ille-et-Vilaine
- Died: May 21, 1961 (aged 88); Rennes
- Citizenship: France
- Scientific career
- Author abbrev. (botany): Lemée
- Author abbrev. (zoology): Lemée

Albert Marie Victor Lemée (1872 – 1961) was a French law graduate, zoologist, botanist and naturalist. He carried out important botanical explorations in French Guiana and present-day Vietnam. He worked for the French Ministry of the Colonies. A presidential decree appointing him an assistant inspector of colonies effective April 1, 1903 was not issued until April 4, 1903.

He died on May 22, 1961, in Rennes.

== Books ==
- Albert Marie Victor Lemée. 1955. Flore de la Guyane française: Dilléniacées à Composées. Volume 3 of Flore de la Guyane française. Published by Imprimerie commerciale et administrative, Brest
  - Listed in a different source as: Lemée, A. 1954. Flore de la Guyane Française. Tome III: Dilléniacées à Composées. XX+655 pp. Editions Paul Lechevalier, Paris. Reference page.
- Albert Marie Victor Lemée. W. H. T. Tams. 1950. Contribution à l'étude des Lépidoptères du Haut-Tonkin (Nord Vietnam) et de Saïgon. Issues 1-10 of Contribution: Avec le concours pour diverses familles d'Hétérocères. Editor Libraries Lechevalier, 82 pp.
- Albert Marie Victor Lemée. 1941. Dictionnaire descriptif et synonymique des genres de plantes phanérogames. Volume 8. Published by Imprimerie commerciale et administrative, Brest

== Eponymy ==
- (Xanthorrhoeaceae) Lemeea P.V.Heath

== Bibliography used ==
- Walter Erhardt, Erich Götz, Allen J. Coombes, Nils Bödeker. 2009. The Timber Press dictionary of plant names. Illustrated Timber Press edition, 920 pp. ISBN 1604691158

== Honors and Awards ==
Officer of the Order of Legion of Honour
