= Melancthon S. Wade =

United States Army general during American Civil War

Melancthon Smith Wade
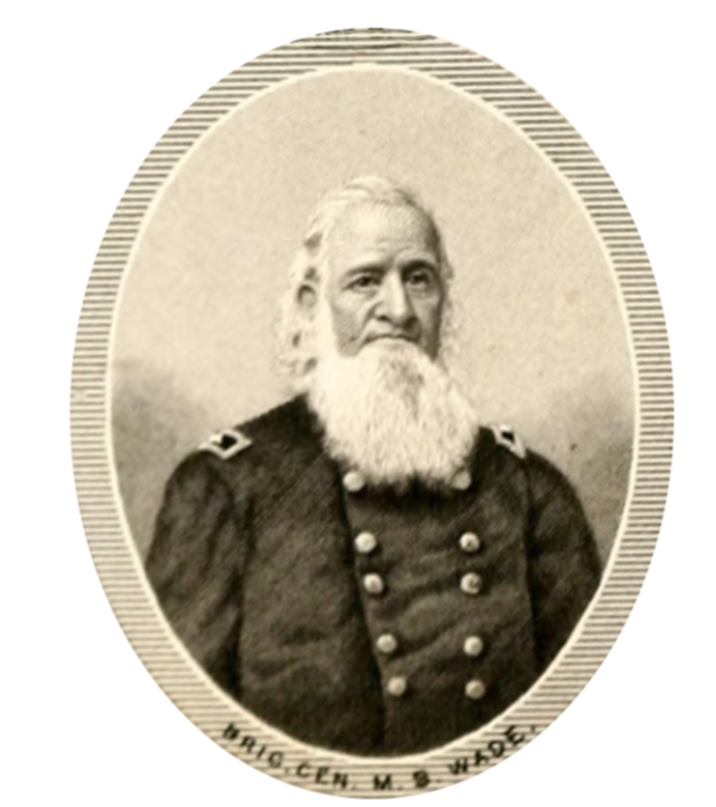
- Born: December 2, 1802; Cincinnati, Ohio, US
- Died: August 11, 1868 (aged 65); Avondale, Ohio, US
- Military career
- Allegiance: United States of America; Union
- Branch: United States Army; Union Army
- Service years: 1861–1862
- Rank: Brigadier general
- Commands: Camp Dennison
- Conflicts: American Civil War

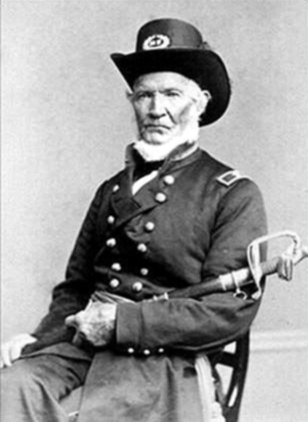
Wade in the Civil war, by Frederick Gutekunst.

Melancthon Smith Wade (December 2, 1801 – August 11, 1868) was a businessman, horticulturist, and soldier from the state of Ohio who served as a general in the Union Army during the early part of the American Civil War.

== Biography ==
Melancthon Wade, the son of an American Revolutionary War officer and prisoner-of-war, Daniel Everett Wade, was born in Cincinnati, Ohio. He was educated in the local schools and then opened a dry goods business that proved so successful that Wade was able to retire in 1840 at the age of 38. Concurrently with his business endeavors, he served with the Ohio Militia from 1825 until 1849, rising through the ranks from sergeant to brigadier general.

Wade married Eliza Armstrong on 27 Aug 1823. They had five or six children.

When the Civil War erupted in 1861, Wade was 58 years old. He volunteered his services to the Union Army and received a commission as a brigadier general on October 1 at the recommendation of Ormsby Mitchel. However, his appointment was never formally confirmed by the U.S. Senate. Wade's wife died on October 27.

He was assigned command of the newly constructed Camp Dennison near Cincinnati. Wade was given a full regiment of infantry to maintain and guard the training camp, as well as to assist in drilling and training the volunteer recruits that came in large numbers to the facility during the early months of the war.

On March 18, 1862, because of poor health and his advancing age, Wade resigned his commission and retired from the service. He returned to his estate in Avondale to engage in work as a fruit farmer and to pursue other horticultural interests with his oldest son, Melancthon Armstrong Wade.

== See also ==
- List of American Civil War generals (Union)
