= Camp Dennison, Ohio =

- Census-designated place
- Location in Hamilton County and the state of Ohio.
- Coordinates: 39°11′36″N 84°17′24″W
- Country: United States
- State: Ohio
- County: Hamilton

Area
  - Total: 0.55 sq mi (1.43 km^{2})
  - Land: 0.54 sq mi (1.39 km^{2})
  - Water: 0.015 sq mi (0.04 km^{2})
- Elevation: 541 ft (165 m)

Population (2020)
  - Total: 384
  - Density: 716.9/sq mi (276.78/km^{2})
- Time zone: UTC-5 (Eastern (EST))
  - Summer (DST): UTC-4 (EDT)
- ZIP code: 45111
- FIPS code: 39-11150
- GNIS feature ID: 2627941

Camp Dennison is a census-designated place (CDP) just outside Indian Hill in southern Symmes Township, Hamilton County, Ohio, United States. It has a post office with the ZIP code 45111. The population was 384 at the 2020 census.

== History ==
The community was settled in 1796 by German immigrants. During the American Civil War, Camp Dennison served as a military recruiting and training post for the United States Army (see Camp Dennison). It is named for William Dennison, the 24th governor of Ohio and U.S. Postmaster General under President Abraham Lincoln.

== Geography ==
Camp Dennison is located in the valley of the Little Miami River, 17 miles (27 km) northeast of downtown Cincinnati. Ohio State Route 126, Glendale Milford Road, runs north-south through the center of the community.

According to the United States Census Bureau, the CDP has a total area of 0.39 square miles (1.0 km^{2}), all land.

== Demographics ==
As of the census of 2020, there were 384 people living in the CDP, for a population density of 716.42 people per square mile (276.78/km^{2}). There were 174 housing units. The racial makeup of the CDP was 77.1% White, 15.1% Black or African American, 0.0% Native American, 0.8% Asian, 0.5% Pacific Islander, 0.3% from some other race, and 6.3% from two or more races. 1.6% of the population were Hispanic or Latino of any race.

There were 143 households, out of which 18.9% had children under the age of 18 living with them, 49.7% were married couples living together, 21.0% had a male householder with no spouse present, and 22.4% had a female householder with no spouse present. 24.5% of all households were made up of individuals, and 14.0% were someone living alone who was 65 years of age or older. The average household size was 2.35, and the average family size was 2.79.

15.5% of the CDP's population were under the age of 18, 57.3% were 18 to 64, and 27.2% were 65 years of age or older. The median age was 54.8. For every 100 females, there were 82.6 males.

According to the U.S. Census American Community Survey, for the period 2016-2020 the estimated median annual income for a household in the CDP was $82,054, and the median income for a family was $86,250. About 10.4% of the population were living below the poverty line, including 0.0% of those under age 18 and 30.1% of those age 65 or over. About 57.3% of the population were employed, and 36.3% had a bachelor's degree or higher.

== Education ==
Residents of Camp Dennison have access to Indian Hill Exempted Village School District.
