= Indian Hill Exempted Village School District =

School district in Ohio

The Indian Hill Exempted Village School District is a public school district in Indian Hill, Ohio, a suburb of Cincinnati, Ohio. It is divided into four schools: Indian Hill High School, which is the ninth through twelfth grades; Middle School, which has sixth through eighth grades; Elementary School, which has third through fifth grades; and Primary School, which has Kindergarten, first, and second grades. The school district encompasses the suburbs of Kenwood, Camp Dennison, Indian Hill, and Madeira, and parts of Symmes and Sycamore townships. District-wide enrollment is approximately 1,900 students (2015). All schools in the district are rated "Excellent" by the Ohio Department of Education and the High School was named one of the top 100 in the country by both Newsweek and U.S. News & World Report magazines. In 2008, Indian Hill Elementary was rated "Excellence with Distinction" by the state of Ohio. School Match, an educational research data base that ranks K-12 schools, continually ranks Indian Hill High School in the 99th percentile in national averages for SAT and ACT scores.
