= Stanley M. Rowe Arboretum =

Arboretum in Indian Hill, Ohio, United States

Coordinates: 39°11′57″N 84°20′23″W

Rowe Arboretum
- Stanley M. Rowe Arboretum
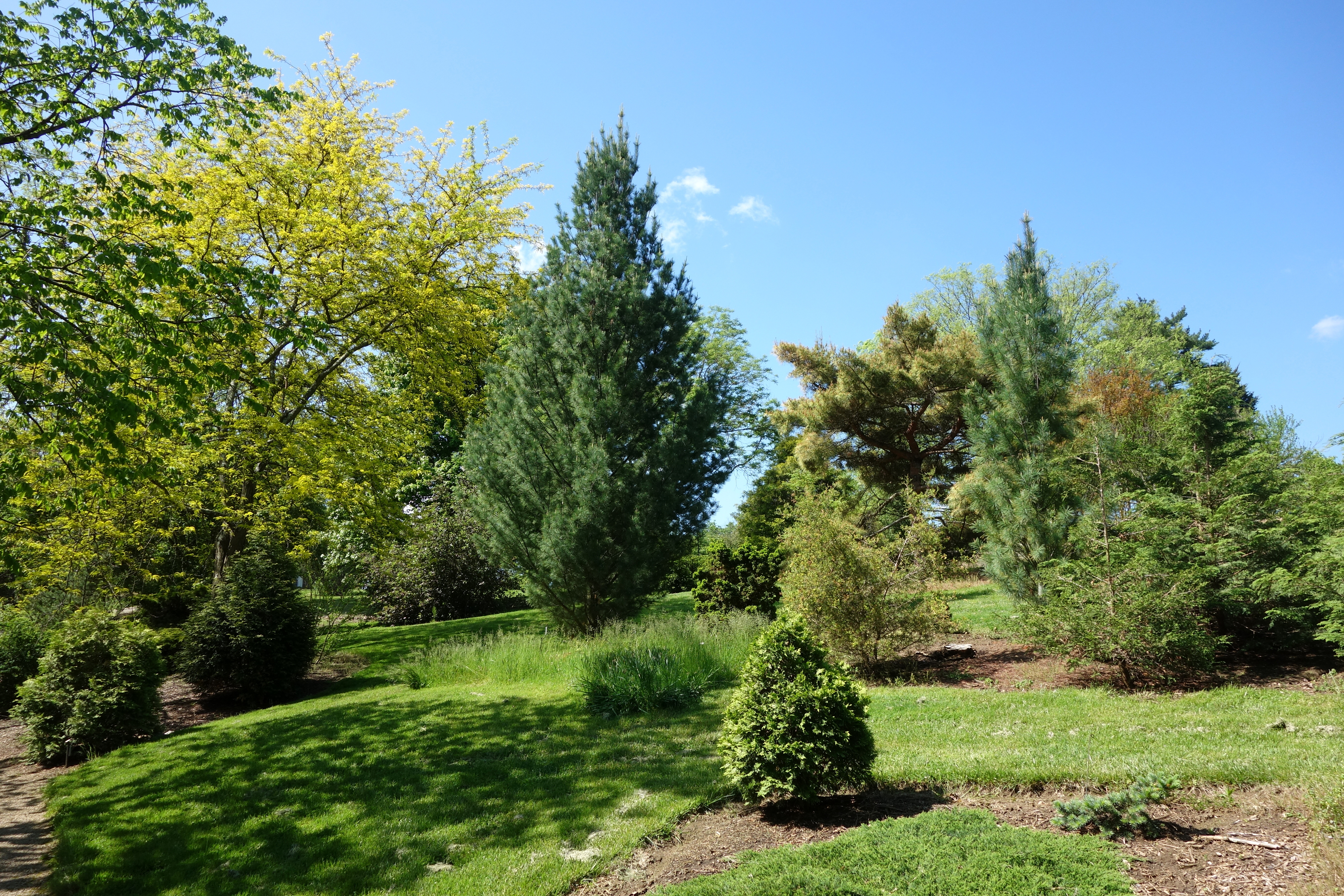
- Interactive map of Rowe Arboretum
- Type: Arboretum
- Location: Indian Hill, Ohio
- Founder: Stanley M. Rowe, Sr.; Dorothy Snowden Rowe
- Website: Official website

The Stanley M. Rowe Arboretum is a public arboretum covering 3.6 hectares (8.9 acres) in Indian Hill, Ohio. It is owned by the Indian Hill city government and operated by a non-profit organization.

The arboretum was founded in 1926 by Stanley M. Rowe Sr. and his wife Dorothy Snowden Rowe. Their first trees were Northern Red Oaks, European Larch, Eastern White Pine, and Scots Pine. The Rowe property eventually expanded to 68 hectares (170 acres) containing some 1,800 different species of trees and shrubs, with a focus on conifers. As most of the finest trees were in one area, it was given to the village as a parkland.

The American Horticultural Society, honoring Rowe in 1982 with an amateur citation for the arboretum, commended its "remarkable collection of conifers, crabapples, magnolias, oaks and beeches". It has been designated as a Conifer Reference Garden by the American Conifer Society.

== See also ==
- List of botanical gardens in the United States
