= Indian Hill, Ohio =

- City
- The City of The Village of Indian Hill
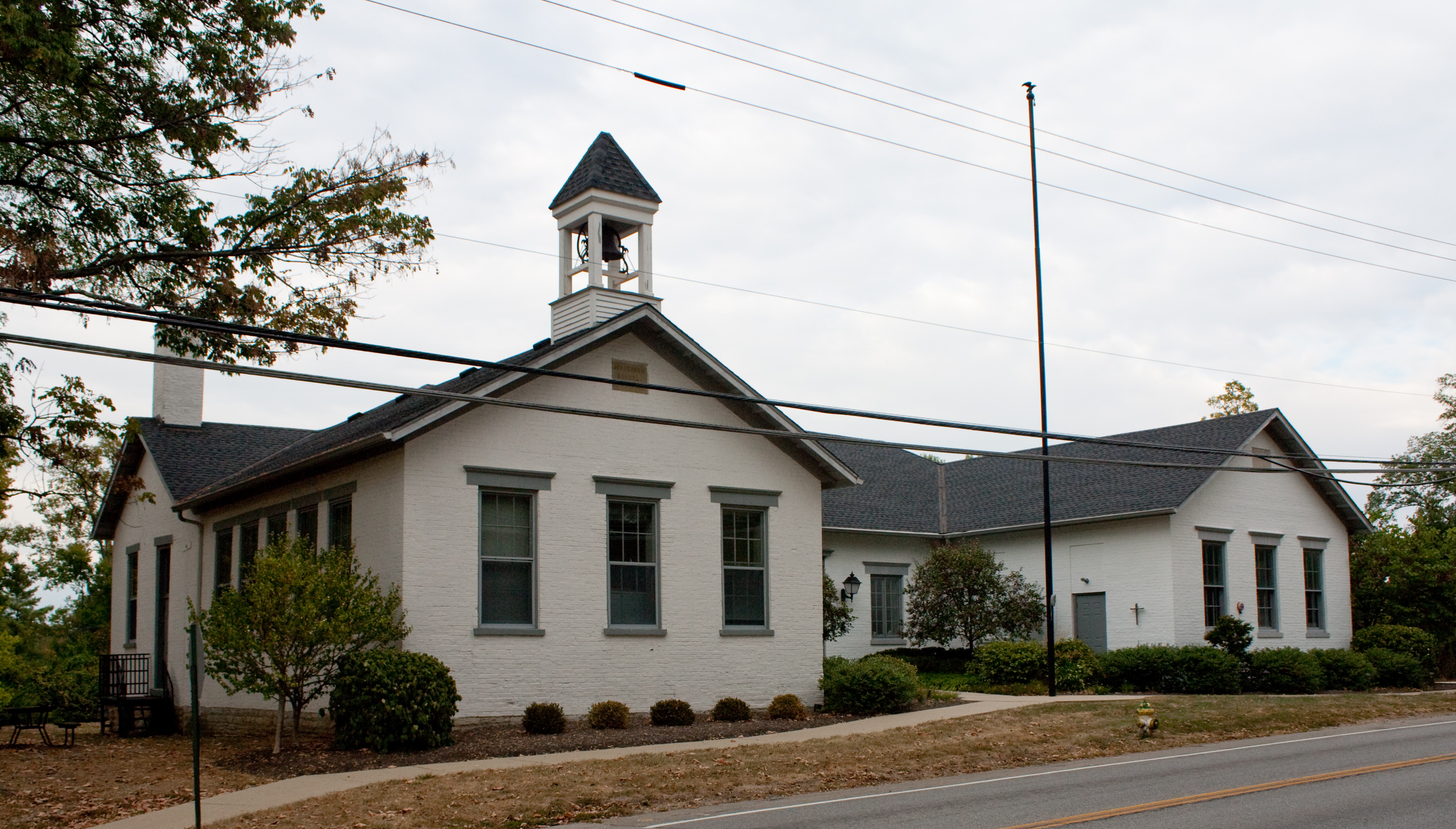
- Jefferson Schoolhouse

- Flag Seal Logo
- Interactive map of Indian Hill, Ohio
- Location within Ohio Location within the United States
- Coordinates: 39°11′57″N 84°20′23″W
- Country: United States
- State: Ohio
- County: Hamilton

Government
  - Mayor: Steve Krehbiel

Area
  - Total: 18.76 sq mi (48.59 km^{2})
  - Land: 18.67 sq mi (48.35 km^{2})
  - Water: 0.097 sq mi (0.25 km^{2})
- Elevation: 883 ft (269 m)

Population (2020)
  - Total: 6,087
  - Estimate (2022): 6,015
  - Density: 326/sq mi (125.9/km^{2})
- Time zone: UTC-5 (Eastern (EST))
  - Summer (DST): UTC-4 (EDT)
- FIPS code: 39-76582
- GNIS feature ID: 1086234
- Website: indianhill.gov

The Village of Indian Hill is a city in Hamilton County, Ohio, United States, and a suburb of the Greater Cincinnati area. The population was 6,087 at the 2020 census. Prior to 1970, Indian Hill was incorporated as a village, but under Ohio law became designated as a city once its population was verified as exceeding 5,000. The municipality then changed its name to add "Village", and legally it is known as "The City of The Village of Indian Hill". The Village of Indian Hill is served by the Indian Hill Exempted Village School District (public school district).

According to Forbes, which authored a list of the wealthiest zip codes in Ohio in 2023, Indian Hill was in third place, directly behind the villages of Coldstream, another suburb within Greater Cincinnati, and Hunting Valley, just outside of Cleveland. The neighborhood's median household income, according to the United States Census Bureau and Forbes, was $194,643 as of 2021, while the median home value was listed at $918,000.

== History ==
"Indian Hill" in Ohio is rooted in Native American history. The area was originally inhabited by Native American tribes, including the Shawnee, Miami, and Delaware, who used the region for hunting and fishing. The name "Indian Hill" emerged in the early 1800s, reflecting the area's Native American heritage. Many of the village's roads follow the paths of early Native American trails, preserving the historical significance of the region.

Later on, the Village of Indian Hill became a farming community which prospered as the nearby Little Miami Railroad provided cost effective shipping to Cincinnati. From about 1904, Cincinnatians bought up its farmhouses as rural weekend destinations. They reached Indian Hill on the Swing Line, a train running between downtown Cincinnati and Ramona Station; the site is now the location of Indian Hill's administration building at Drake and Shawnee Run roads.

The rolling country appealed to a group of four Cincinnati businessmen who had built homes there in the early 1920s and envisioned a more ambitious rural settlement, persuading friends to join them in forming the Camargo Realty Company in 1924. Camargo assembled 12,000 acres (49 km^{2}) of farmland and divided some into 25-acre (100,000 m^{2}) plots, sold for $75 to $150 per acre, and a district of grand mansions with stables and outbuildings grew up, with kennels that housed the Camargo Hunt. Some were authentic estates, such as the 1,200-acre (4.9 km^{2}) "Peterloon" of John J. Emery, which has since been subdivided into lots as small as 1 acre (4,000 m^{2}).

One hundred percent of Indian Hill is zoned as single-family residential or agricultural.

== Geography ==
According to the United States Census Bureau, the city has a total area of 18.65 square miles (48.30 km^{2}), of which 18.55 square miles (48.04 km^{2}) is land and 0.10 square miles (0.26 km^{2}) is water. Its physical characteristics run the gamut from flat, open, grassy fields to heavily wooded, steeply sloped, mature canopy forest. There are meandering streams, dark pine stands, and intriguing geological formations with a plethora of fossils.

== Demographics ==
Historical population
Census	Pop.	Note	%±
1950	2,090		—
1960	4,526		116.6%
1970	5,651		24.9%
1980	5,521		−2.3%
1990	5,383		−2.5%
2000	5,907		9.7%
2010	5,785		−2.1%
2020	6,087		5.2%
2022 (est.)	6,015		−1.2%

=== 2020 census ===
As of the census of 2020, there were 6,087 people living in the city, for a population density of 326.08 people per square mile (125.90/km^{2}). There were 2,228 housing units. The racial makeup of the city was 86.9% White, 0.6% Black or African American, 0.1% Native American, 7.1% Asian, 0.0% Pacific Islander, 0.7% from some other race, and 4.8% from two or more races. 2.2% of the population were Hispanic or Latino of any race.

There were 2,364 households, out of which 29.9% had children under the age of 18 living with them, 84.8% were married couples living together, 5.1% had a male householder with no spouse present, and 9.1% had a female householder with no spouse present. 10.0% of all households were made up of individuals, and 5.8% were someone living alone who was 65 years of age or older. The average household size was 2.54, and the average family size was 2.69.

23.1% of the city's population were under the age of 18, 51.3% were 18 to 64, and 25.6% were 65 years of age or older. The median age was 54.4. For every 100 females, there were 98.6 males.

According to the U.S. Census American Community Survey, for the period 2016-2020 the estimated median annual income for a household in the city was $194,643, and the median income for a family was $214,180. About 0.6% of the population were living below the poverty line, including 0.0% of those under age 18 and 1.7% of those age 65 or over. About 52.5% of the population were employed, and 79.4% had a bachelor's degree or higher.

=== 2010 census ===
At the 2010 census there were 5,785 people in 2,061 households, including 1,768 families, in the city. The population density was 311.9 inhabitants per square mile (120.4/km^{2}). There were 2,236 housing units at an average density of 120.5 per square mile (46.5/km^{2}). The racial makeup of the city was 92.2% White, 0.7% African American, 0.1% Native American, 5.7% Asian, 0.2% from other races, and 1.1% from two or more races. Hispanic or Latino of any race were 1.6%.

Of the 2,061 households, 37.0% had children under the age of 18 living with them, 80.2% were married couples living together, 4.0% had a female householder with no husband present, 1.6% had a male householder with no wife present, and 14.2% were non-families. 12.4% of households were one person, and 7% were one person aged 65 or older. The average household size was 2.81 and the average family size was 3.06.

The median age was 48.4 years. 27% of residents were under the age of 18; 4.9% were between the ages of 18 and 24; 12.1% were from 25 to 44; 38.5% were from 45 to 64; and 17.5% were 65 or older. The gender makeup of the city was 48.4% male and 51.6% female.

=== 2000 census ===
At the 2000 census there were 5,907 people in 2,066 households, including 1,751 families, in the city. The population density was 318.7 inhabitants per square mile (123.1/km^{2}). There were 2,155 housing units at an average density of 116.3 per square mile (44.9/km^{2}). The racial makeup of the city was 94.41% White, 0.54% African American, 0.08% Native American, 3.88% Asian, 0.15% from other races, and 0.93% from two or more races. Hispanic or Latino of any race were 0.59%.

Of the 2,066 households, 40.9% had children under the age of 18 living with them, 80.3% were married couples living together, 2.8% had a female householder with no husband present, and 15.2% were non-families. 14.4% of households were one person, and 8.5% were one person aged 65 or older. The average household size was 2.86 and the average family size was 3.16.

In the city, the population was spread out, with 30.3% under the age of 18, 4.3% from 18 to 24, 16.1% from 25 to 44, 34.6% from 45 to 64, and 14.8% 65 or older. The median age was 45 years. For every 100 females, there were 96.8 males. For every 100 females age 18 and over, there were 95.9 males.

The median household income was $158,742 and the median family income was $179,356. Males had a median income of $100,000 versus $66,875 for females. The per capita income for the city was $96,872. About 1.6% of families and 2.4% of the population were below the poverty line, including 4.5% of those under age 18 and none of those age 65 or over.

== Education ==
The educational needs of Indian Hill residents are served by the Indian Hill Exempted Village School District (public) and Cincinnati Country Day School (private). The Indian Hill Exempted Village School District comprises Indian Hill Primary School (K-2), Indian Hill Elementary School (3–5), Indian Hill Middle School (6–8), and Indian Hill High School (9–12). The Indian Hill Exempted Village School District also serves residents residing in parts of Symmes Township (Camp Dennison, Remington, Loveland) and Sycamore Township (Kenwood). Cincinnati Country Day School serves residents across the Greater Cincinnati area, as well as Indian Hill residents.

== Notable people ==
- Neil Armstrong, American astronaut and first person to walk on the Moon
- William DeWitt Jr., Managing Partner and Chairman of the St. Louis Cardinals
- Peter Frampton, English-American rock musician
- Paul Hackett, attorney, congressional candidate
- Mat Latos, pitcher for Miami Marlins
- Marvin Lewis, former head coach of the Cincinnati Bengals
- Carl Lindner Jr., businessman
- Carson Palmer, American football quarterback
- Mercer Reynolds, businessman
- Marge Schott, president and CEO of the Cincinnati Reds
- Rick Steiner, Broadway producer
- Potter Stewart, associate justice of the United States Supreme Court
- Robert A. Taft, conservative American politician
- Victory Van Tuyl, professional actress
- J. J. Wolf, tennis player
- Victoria Wells Wulsin, congressional candidate

== See also ==
- Stanley M. Rowe Arboretum
