= Étang d'Urbino =

Lagoon in Corsica

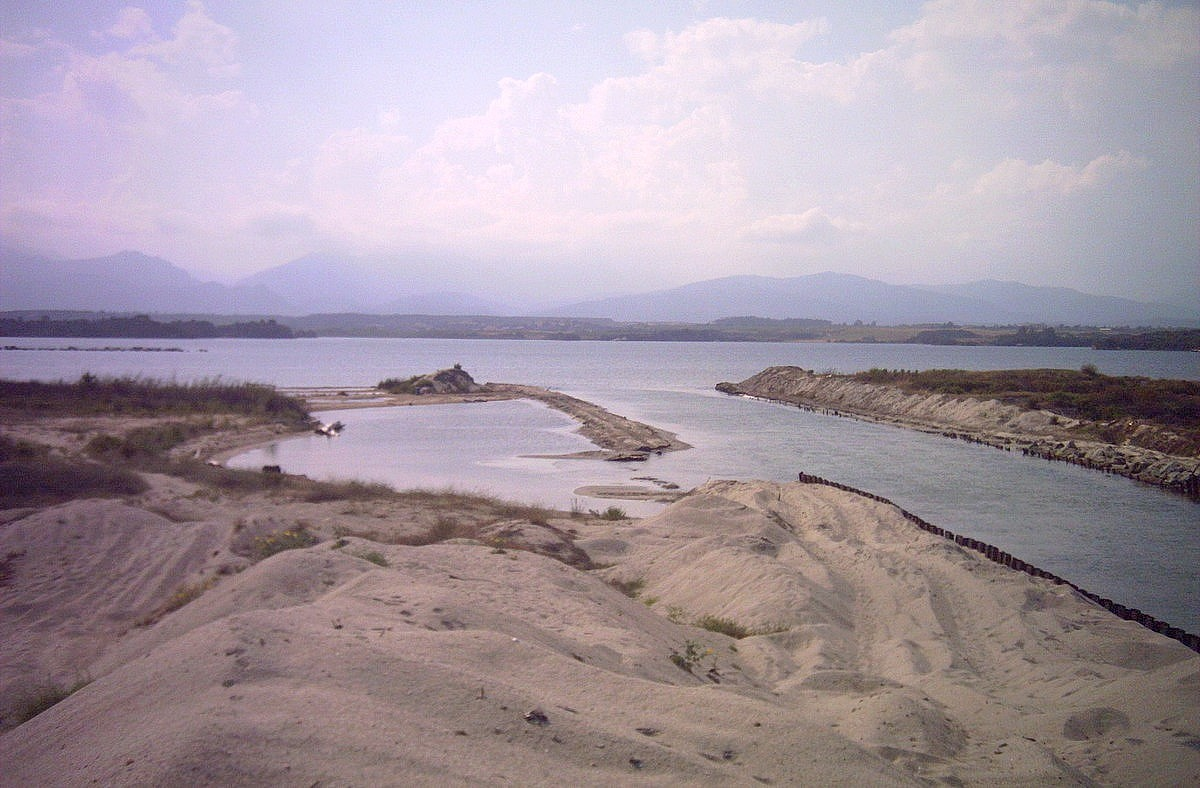
- Étang d'Urbino seen from its outlet to the sea.

- Location within Corsica Location within France
- Coordinates: 42°02′53″N 9°28′22″E
- Type: Lagoon
- Max. width: 7.9 square kilometres (3.1 sq mi)

The Étang d'Urbino (Note: Étang may be translated as "pond" or "lagoon".) (or Étang d'Urbinu) is a coastal lagoon beside the Tyrrhenian Sea in the Haute-Corse department on the French island of Corsica.

== Location ==
The Étang d'Urbino is in the commune of Ghisonaccia between the T10 coastal highway and the sea, to the northeast of the village of Ghisonaccia. The northeast shore is in the commune of Aléria. It is the second largest lagoon in Corsica with an area of 790 hectares (2,000 acres). (Note: The Étang de Biguglia to the north is the largest lagoon in Corsica.)

== Physical ==
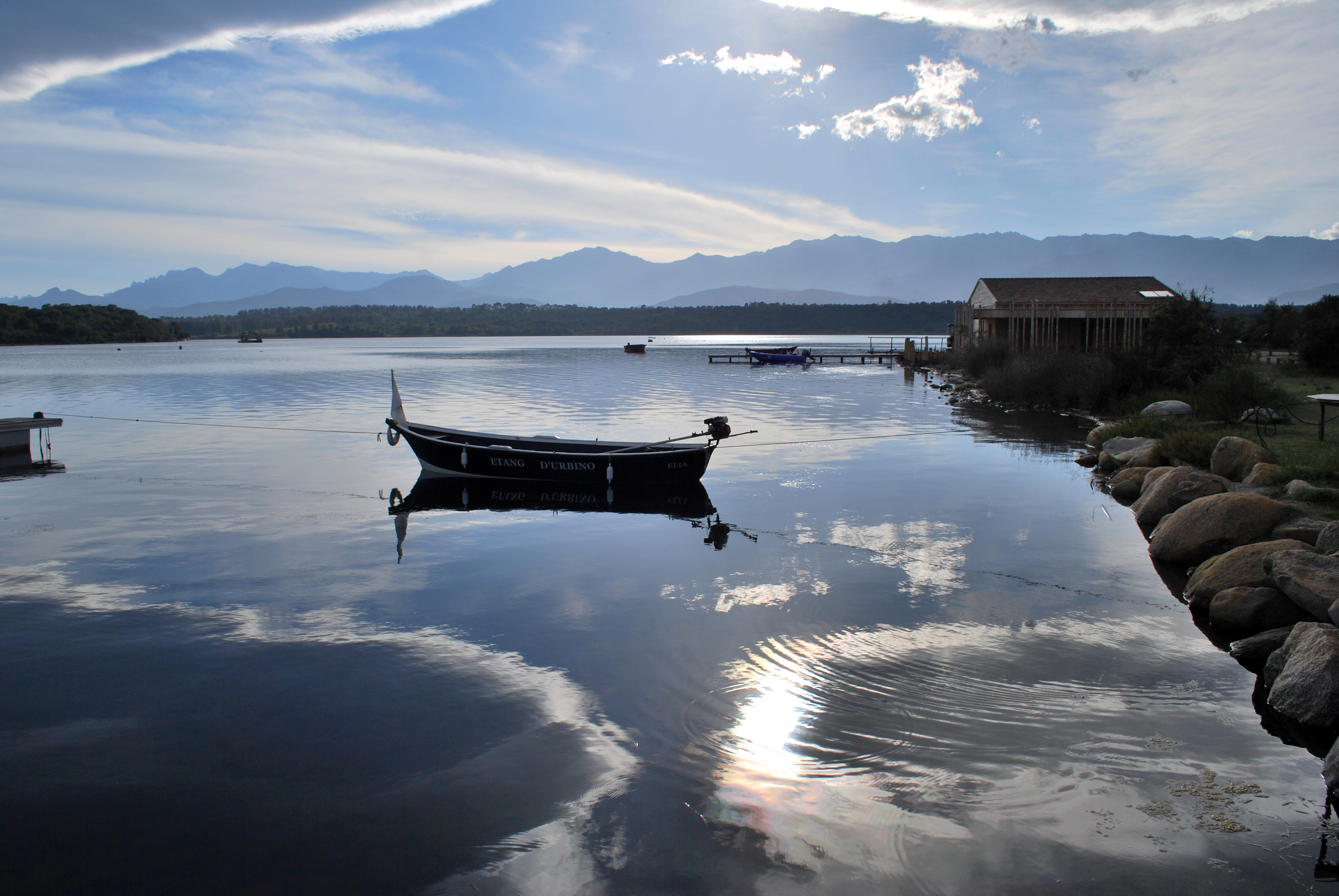
Boat anchored in the lagoon

The lagoon was formed by tectonic activity. It is part of a string of lagoons on the 12 kilometres (7.5 mi) section of the east coast of Corsica between the Fiumorbu and Travo rivers. It is roughly circular, divided into two parts by the Isola Longa, a large peninsula extending from the west shore. There is an island in the southwest of the lagoon. The northeast and east shores are flat and sandy, while the peninsula, island and northwest shores have small cliffs. The cliffs fall straight into the sea on the north coast of the peninsula, but elsewhere are bordered by narrow sandy beaches. The bottom of the lagoon consists of mud, sand, terrigenous sediments and shell sediments. The greatest depth is 9 metres (30 ft).

A lido (sandbar) separates the lagoon from the sea, populated by a coastal forest of junipers and a dune forest with maritime pine. The salinity of the lagoon does not vary much, allowing greater diversity of species than in other lagoons in the area. A channel links the lagoon to the sea. This was originally located in the south of the sandbar, but in the 1970s was artificially developed to the north to let larger quantities of seawater in and thus ensure better oxygenation of the water to improve the ecological quality. Maintenance of the channel, provided by the Collectivité de Corse, is critical in maintaining the health of the lagoon.

== Human activities ==
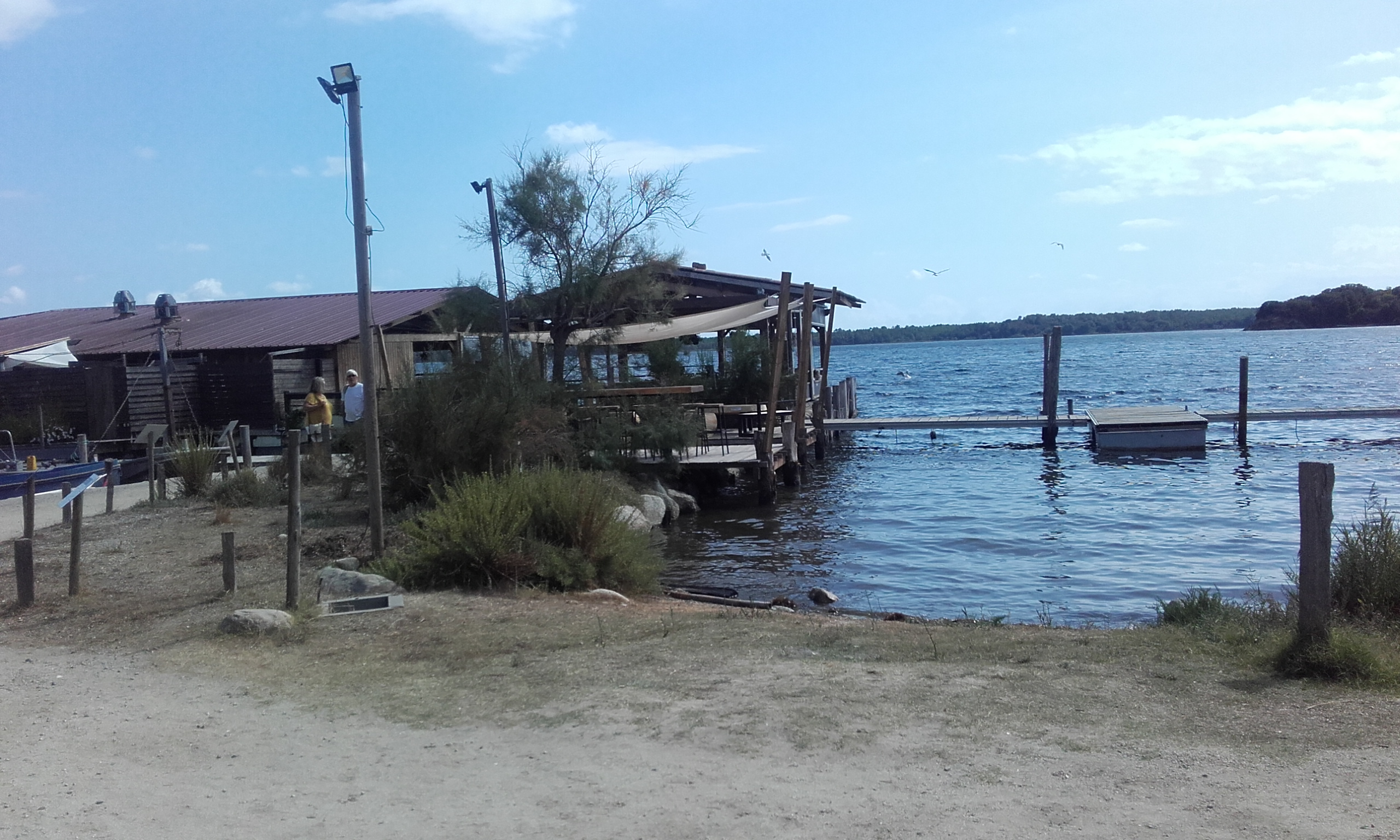
Seafood restaurant on the lagoon

The lagoon is well preserved, with very little urbanization. It has long been used for traditional fishing and for oyster farming, although the shellfish farming was suspended in 2016 due to infection with ostreid herpesvirus 1. It is not used for recreational boating, but visitors fish or swim from the beach, and drive all-terrain vehicles on the dunes despite the extreme damage they cause to the environment. There is a busy restaurant on the south of the peninsula. The watershed has some agriculture with cultivation of grapes, citrus and olives, and extensive livestock farming. Most urbanization is along the National 197 road. The lagoon is used as a water source for aerial firefighting when there is a forest fire in the region.

== Ecology ==
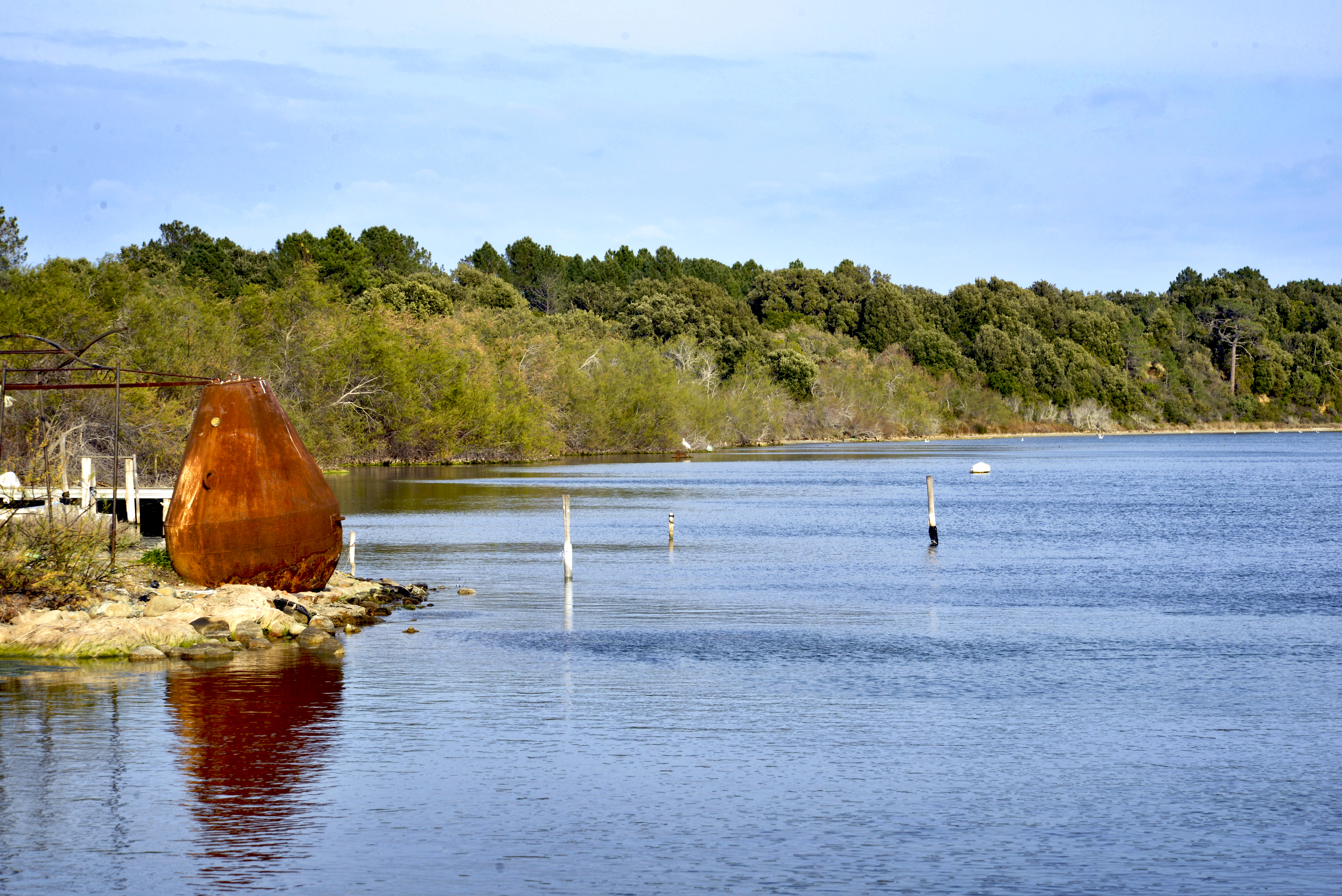
The wooded Isola longa peninsula

In 2004 the Étang d’Urbino became a Natura 2000 site managed by the Collectivity of Corsica. It became the property of the Conservatoire du littoral in 2007. In 2009 it was designated a Ramsar site.

Juniperus macrocarpa, Juniperus phoenicea and Pinus pinaster grow on the coastal dunes. The Coastal Mallow (Kosteletzkya pentacarpos), a protected, vulnerable and rare plant species is present at the site. The bottom of the lagoon supports dense meadows of aquatic phanerogams, dominated by Cymodocea nodosa. At the mouths of the streams there are freshwater reed beds. Salt marshes and salt-tolerant canes and tamarix are valued by the birds. The lagoon is rich in fish including protected species such as Mediterranean killifish (Aphanius fasciatus) and eel.

The lagoon is used as a resting point for many birds migrating to the south, and is home to many birds during the resproduction and breeding season. 113 species of bird have been reported. 37 species breed around the lagoon including red-crested pochard (Netta rufina) and common shelduck (Tadorna tadorna), which are no longer common elsewhere in Corsica. The freshwater entering to the north of the peninsula is regularly frequented by birds such as mallard, shoveler, Eurasian teal and coot. The small marches and mudflats are all colonized by shorebirds and waders. The most common species are great cormorant (Phalacrocorax carbo), Eurasian coot (Fulica atra) and great crested grebe (Podiceps cristatus). Recently there has been an increase in numbers of flamingo (Phoenicopterus roseus) and great egret (Ardea alba).

Colonial shorebirds such as terns and gulls are finding fewer and fewer places to nest as the Mediterranean shoreline is built up. In March 2016 a 200 square metres (2,200 sq ft) nesting raft, the largest in Europe, was set up on the lagoon as part of the "Mediterranean Community Life + Envoll" program. It is designed to be suitable for nesting by protected heritage species that have poor reproduction rates. Common terns and black-headed gulls have used the raft and a healthy number of fledgling chicks have been observed.

== Sources ==
- Biguglia Pond Natural Reserve, Bastia office de tourisma intercommunal
- "Étang d'Urbino", Pôle-relais lagunes méditerranéennes (in French)
- "Etang d'Urbino", Service d’information sur les Sites Ramsar
- Nicole Mari (29 March 2016), "Etang d'Urbinu : Le plus grand radeau d'Europe pour la nidification des oiseaux marins protégés", Corse Net Infos (in French)
- "Relation: Étang d´Urbino (4676292)", OpejStreetMap
