= Étang de Diane =

- Stagnu di Diana (Corsican)
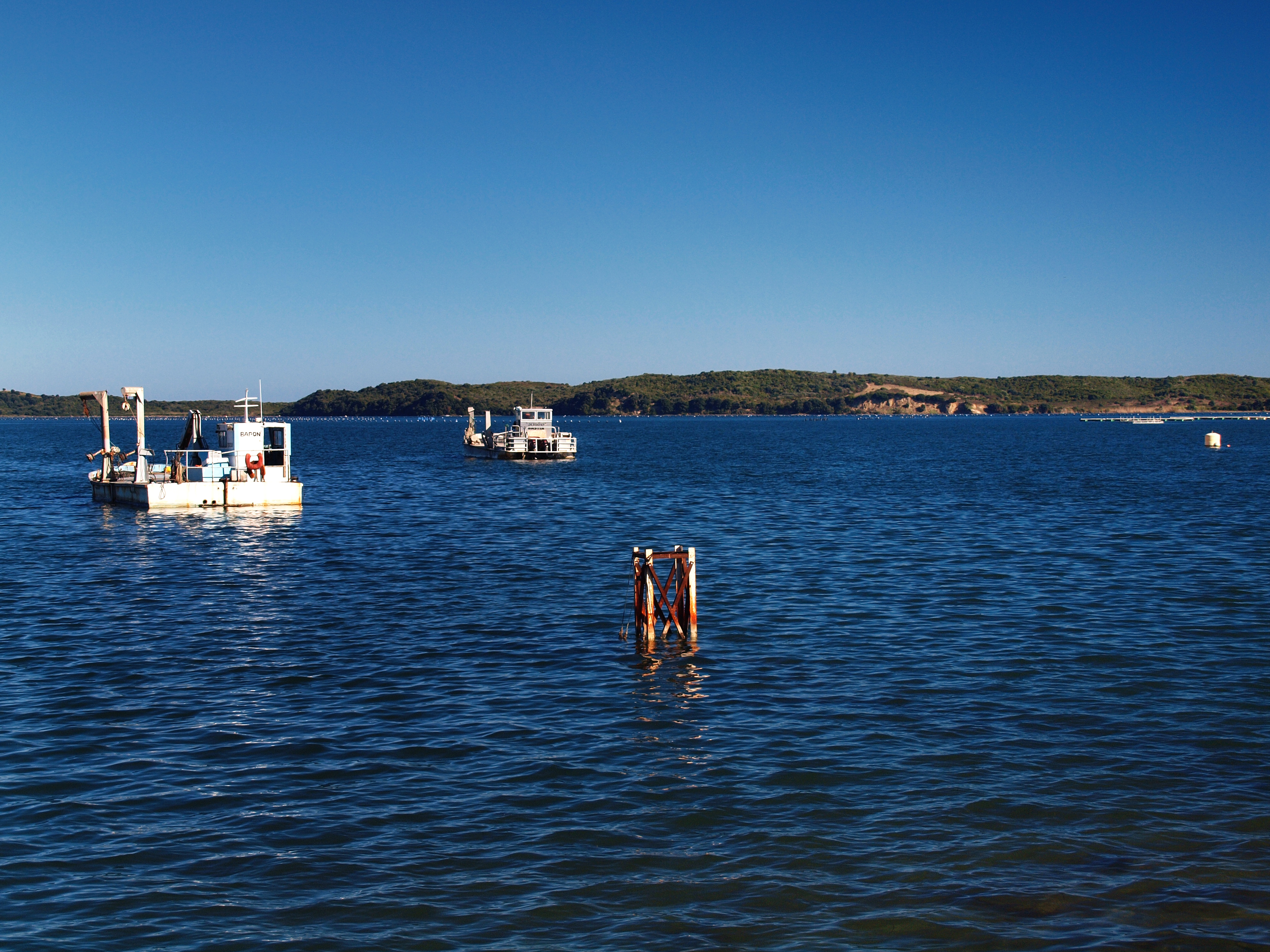
- Étang de Diane from Aléria

- Location within Corsica Location within France
- Coordinates: 42°07′52″N 9°32′05″E
- Type: Lagoon
- Max. width: 570 hectares (1,400 acres)

The Étang de Diane (Note: Étang may be translated as "pond" or "lagoon".) (Corsican: Stagnu di Diana) is a coastal lagoon beside the Tyrrhenian Sea on the east coast of Haute-Corse department on the French island of Corsica. The lagoon served as a port for the Ancient Greeks, and then for the Romans. Today it is privately owned and mainly used for shellfish farming and fishing.

== Location ==
The Étang de Diane is between the T10 coastal highway and the sea, just north of the village of Aléria. It is divided between the communes of Aléria in the south and Tallone in the north. The Tavignano river enters the sea just south of Aléria and the lagoon. The Étang de Terrenzana is just north of the lagoon.

== Physical ==
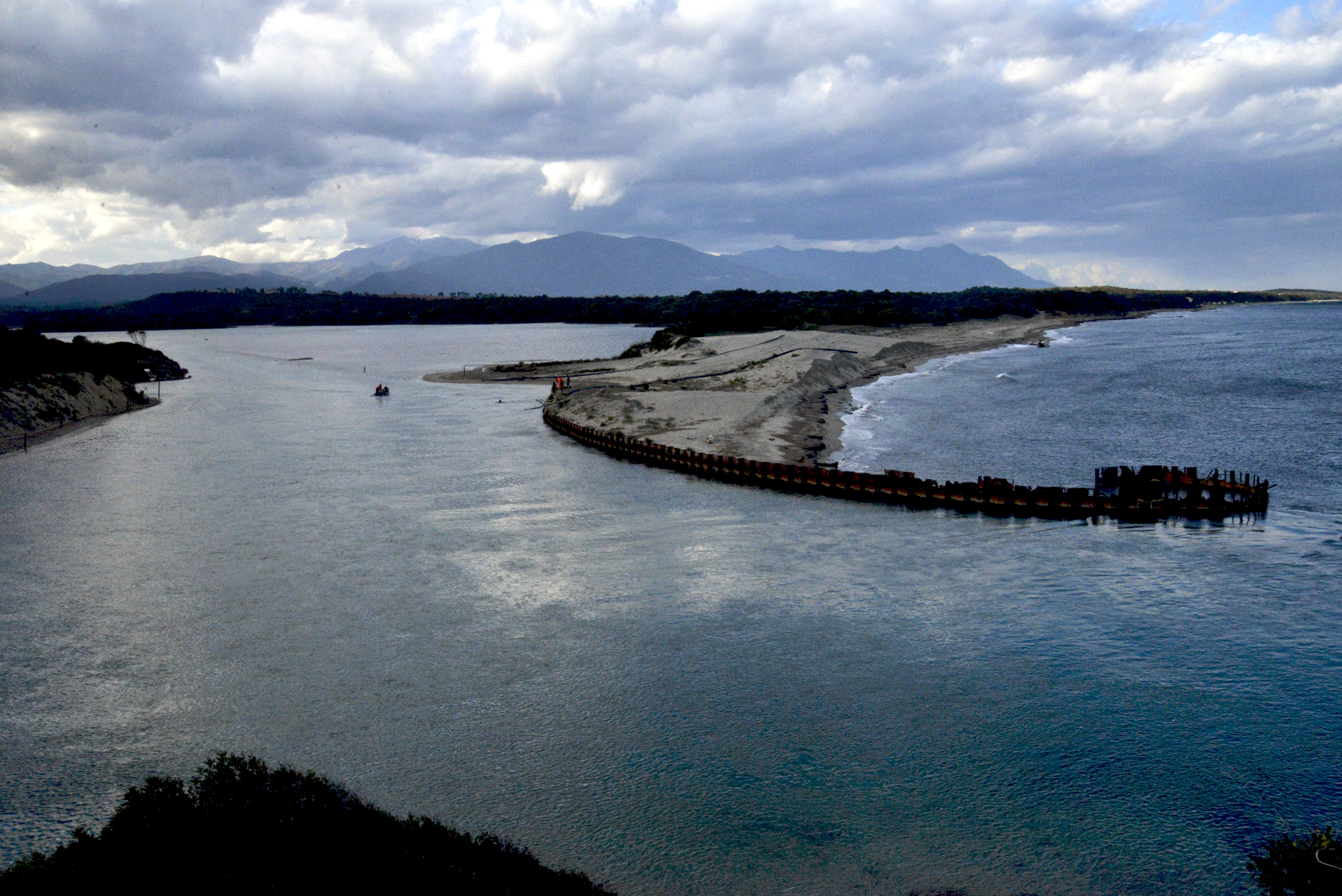
Channel to the sea

The Étang de Diane is separated from the sea by a marshy area and a lido (sand bar). The lagoon has a channel to the sea running east from the north end. The channel plays a key role in maintaining the quality of the environment and thus supporting aquaculture.

The main source of freshwater is the Ruisseau d'Arena, which enters the north end of the lagoon from the west. This stream is 16.73 kilometres (10.40 mi) long and merges with the Pompugliani, which runs through a marsh near its mouth. The combined stream enters the lagoon near Diana Island. Another tributary is the Pietroni, which defines the border between the communes of Aléria and Tallona and is 4.2 kilometres (2.6 mi) long. The Ronsignese enters the south of the lagoon and is 8.27 kilometres (5.14 mi) long.

The lagoon has an area of 570 hectares (1,400 acres), making it the third largest in Corsica. (Note: The Étang de Biguglia to the north is the largest lagoon in Corsica. The Étang d'Urbino is the second largest with an area of 790 hectares (2,000 acres).) The lagoon and surrounding marshes are included in a Zone naturelle d'intérêt écologique, faunistique et floristique (ZNIEFF) with an area of 684 hectares (1,690 acres). Diane is the deepest lagoon in Corsica, with maximum depth of 11 metres (36 ft). The average depth is 4 metres (13 ft) and average altitude is 3 metres (9.8 ft). It holds an estimated 33,400,000 cubic metres (1.18×10^{9} cu ft) of water.

The watershed covers 62 square kilometres (24 sq mi). The southern part of the lagoon was formed when an extensive geological movement caused a basin to form in Miocene sediments. This accounts for the relative depth of the lagoon and its jagged shoreline. The shallower northern part formed in the normal way for a lagoon, when a sandy lido isolated the body of water from the sea.

== Ecology ==
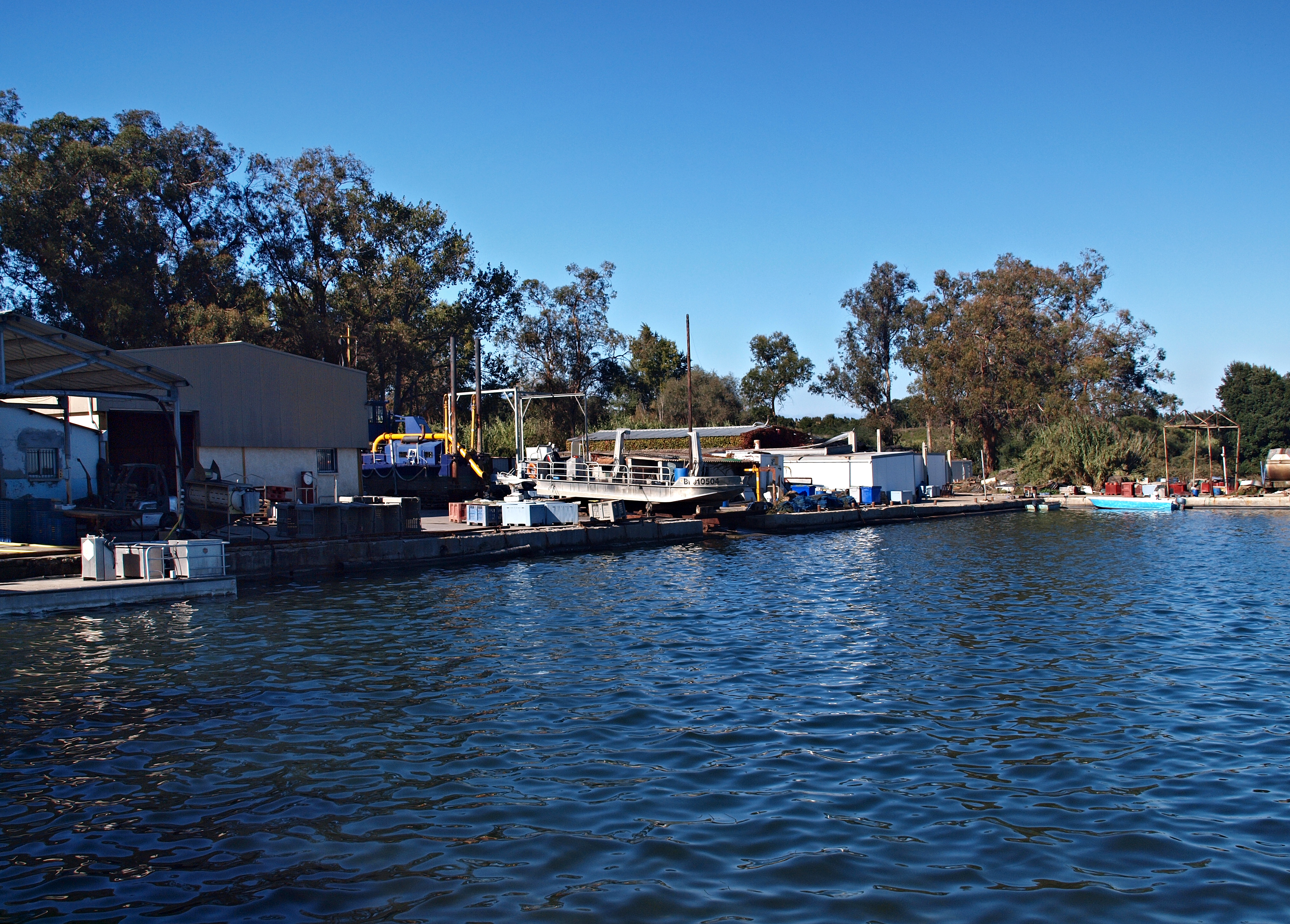
Commercial structures on the lagoon

According to the Ramsar Convention the lagoon is a wetland of international importance. It is protected as a Zone naturelle d'intérêt écologique, faunistique et floristique (ZNIEFF). It is owned by the Conservatoire du littoral.

The lagoon is not very saline, and has an interesting plant ecology. There is luxurious Mediterranean maquis shrubland, a zone of salt-tolerant plants including samphires around the sea channel, a huge reed bed at the mouth of the Ruisseau d'Arena, and small wetlands with phragmites and rushes. The banks of the lagoon hold a belt 3–4 metres (9.8–13.1 ft) deep of sea grasses such as Cymodocea nodosa and Zostera species that are favorable to the growth of juvenile fish. Algae grow in the lagoon when and where conditions allow. On the banks the once predominant maquis is now a narrow belt of salicornia and inulas between the lagoon and vineyards or crops such as kiwifruit.

There are many invertebrates including the nationally protected fan mussel (Pinna nobilis). The lagoon has 34 species of fish. Common fish species include mullet, bass (Moronidae), sole, plaice and eel. The fishing structures and maintenance of the sea channel support the fish nursery, and migrant fish are found throughout the lagoon.

The wetland is used by many species of rare or endangered birds for breeding or for resting while in passage. Visitors include great cormorants, gulls, mallards and coots. The fish attract a large population of great cormorants and laridae. Small flocks of Eurasian wigeons use the lagoon as a resting place. Shorebirds and large waders frequent the mudflats at the mouth of the Arena and the remote shores of the lagoon.

== History ==
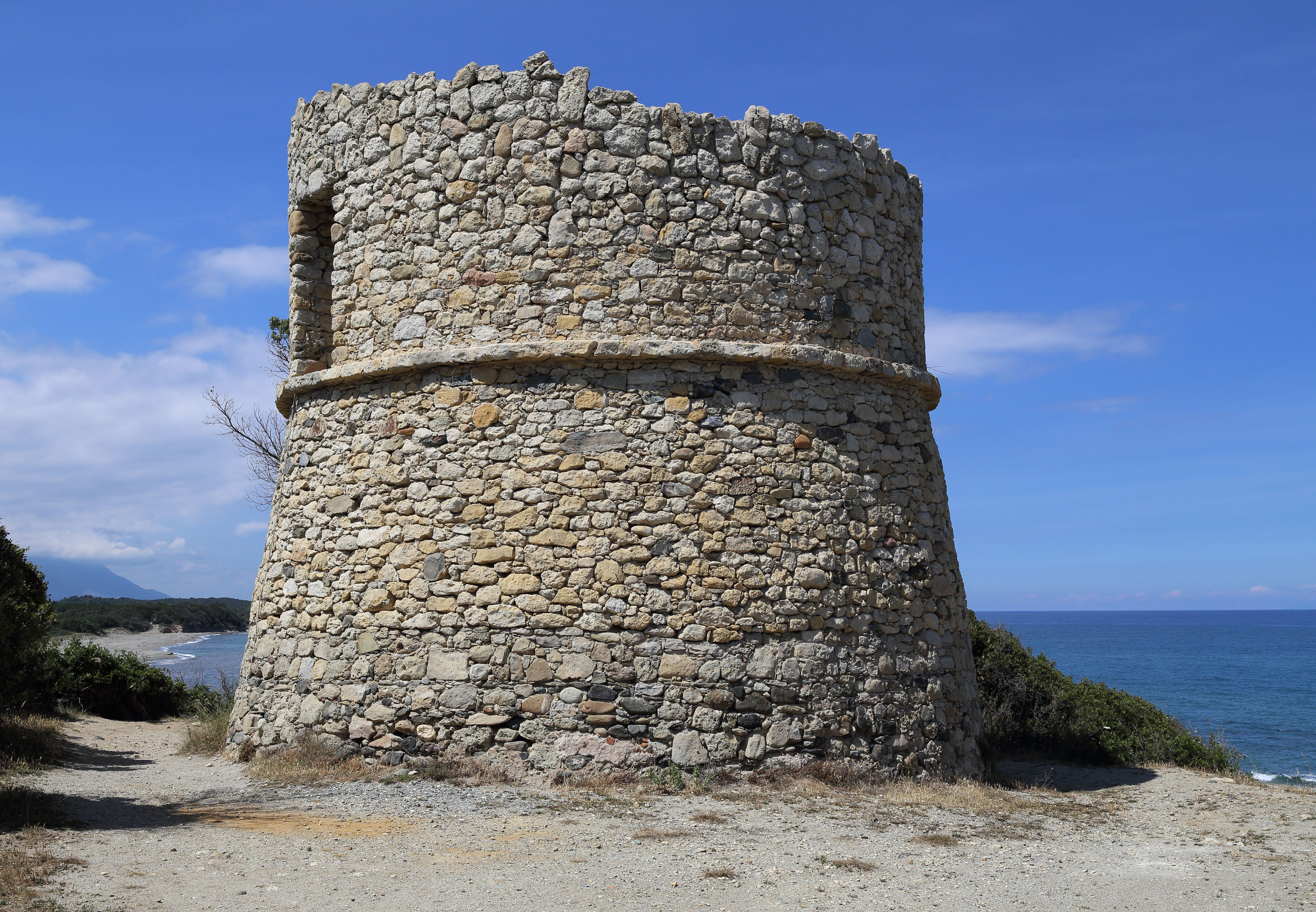
Tour de Diane

The name "Diana" is one of various place names in Corsica that indicates the long dominance of the Greeks. Colonna de Cesari-Rocca in his 1916 Histoire de Corse says, "A few kilometers from Alalia, the Diana lagoon could shelter a commercial fleet and lend itself to the development of a war fleet. Thus a Greek Empire began to take shape in the western Mediterranean." It seems that the Greek colonists from Phocaea came to the Étang de Diane in Corsica around the year 537 BC and from there some went on to Massala (Marseille). Later the Phocaeans of Corsica and Massala fought together against the Carthaginians. Ptolemy showed Dianæ portus on his maps. The Romans later had a colony at Aleria served by the Port of Diane.

The Tour de Diane, a tower that the Genoese built at the and of the 16th century, stands at the entrance to the sea channel. It was used to signal the approach of Barbary pirates and to protect the interior of the island.

== Human activities ==
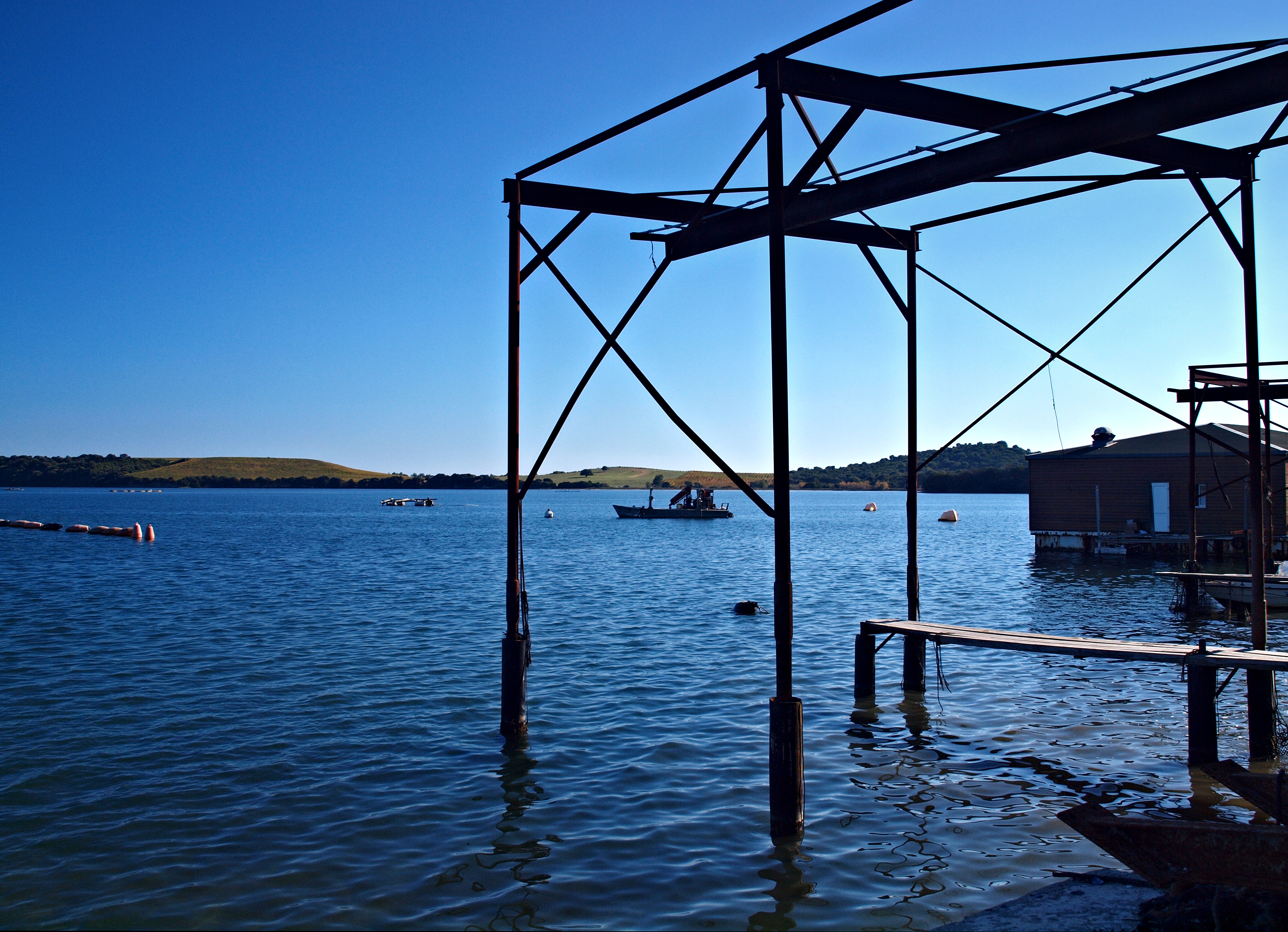
Fish unloading structure

The Étang de Diane is not used much by the public, who usually only visit the coastal fringe. The lagoon is privately owned by the Groupement Foncier Agricole de Diana (GFA), which leases it to companies who operate and manage it. Three shellfish and aquaculture companies harvest oysters and mussels, sea bass, sea bream and other species. Fishing is done with gillnets and fyke nets. Five structures are spread over 80% of the lagoon.

The channel to the sea is managed by the Coopérative d'Utilisation de Matériel Agricole which removes sand each year to allow the waters of the lagoon to be renewed. The lagoon does not suffer from eutrophication but lack of sanitation in some villas on the southwest edge causes microbiological problems. There are wineries quite near the lagoon, and agriculture up to the edge of the surrounding cliffs. Agriculture may contribute pollution of the lagoon with nitrogen, phosphorus, pesticides and heavy metals.

== Sources ==
- Biguglia Pond Natural Reserve, Bastia office de tourisma intercommunal
- Colonna de Cesari-Rocca, Pierre Paul Raoul; Villat, Louis (1916), Histoire de Corse (in French), Paris: Boivin
- Étang de Diane (in French), Pôle-relais lagunes méditerranéennes
- "Relation: Étang de Diane (76784)", OpejStreetMap
- "Etang d'Urbino", Service d’information sur les Sites Ramsar
- Leveque, Nicolas (July 2009), "Fiche descriptive de l'étang de Diane", Fiches signalétiques des principaux complexes lagunaires du bassin méditerranéen (PDF) (in French), Office de l’Environnement de la Corse
- Poli, Xavier (1907), La Corse dans l'antiquité et dans le haut moyen age (in French), A. Fontemoing
- "Ruisseau de Pietroni", Sandre (in French)
- "Ruisseau de Ronsignese", Sandre (in French)
- "Ruisseau d'Arèna", Sandre (in French)
- "ZNIEFF 940004086 Étang et zone humide de Diana", Inventaire national du patrimoine naturel (INPN) (in French), MNHN & OFB
