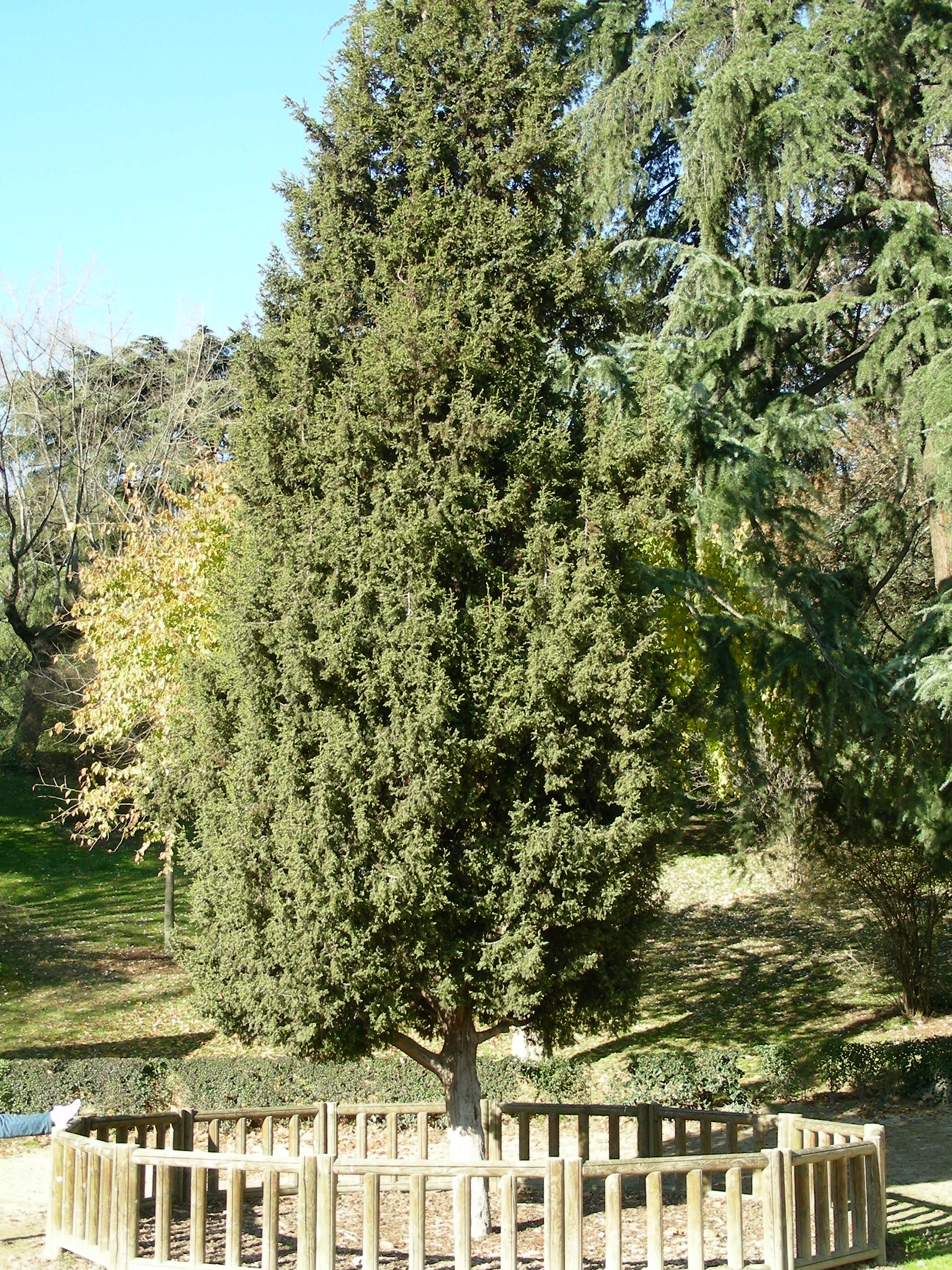
- Specimen in Madrid, Spain

Conservation status
- Least Concern (IUCN 3.1)

Scientific classification
- Kingdom: Plantae
- Clade: Embryophytes
- Clade: Tracheophytes
- Clade: Gymnosperms
- Division: Pinophyta
- Class: Pinopsida
- Order: Cupressales
- Family: Cupressaceae
- Genus: Juniperus
- Section: Juniperus sect. Caryocedrus
- Species: J. drupacea

Binomial name
- Juniperus drupacea Labill.
- Natural range

= Juniperus drupacea =

Species of juniper tree

Juniperus drupacea, the Syrian juniper, is a species of juniper native to the eastern Mediterranean region from southern Greece (mount Parnon in the Peloponnese), southern Turkey, western Syria, Lebanon, and northern Israel, growing on rocky sites from 800–1,700 metres (2,600–5,600 feet) in altitude. The species is the sole member of Juniperus sect. Caryocedrus., which is sometimes recognised as genus Arceuthos.

== Description ==
Juniperus drupacea is the tallest species of juniper, forming a conical tree 10–25 metres (33–82 feet) tall, exceptionally up to 40 m (130 ft), and with a trunk up to 1–2 m (3 1/2–6 1/2 ft) thick. It has needle-like leaves in whorls of three; the leaves are green, 5–25 millimetres (1/4–1 in) long and 2–3 mm broad, with a double white stomatal band (split by a green midrib) on the inner surface. It is usually dioecious, with separate male and female plants.

The seed cones are the largest of any juniper, berry-like but hard and dry, green ripening in about 25 months to dark purple-brown with a pale blue waxy coating; they are ovoid to spherical, 20–27 mm (3/4–1 in) long and 20–25 mm diameter, and have six or nine fused scales in 2–3 whorls, each scale with a slightly raised apex. The three apical scales each bear a single seed, but with the three seeds fused together into a single nut-like shell. The male cones are produced in clusters (unlike any other juniper) of 5–20 cones together, yellow, 3–4 mm long, and fall soon after shedding their pollen in early spring.

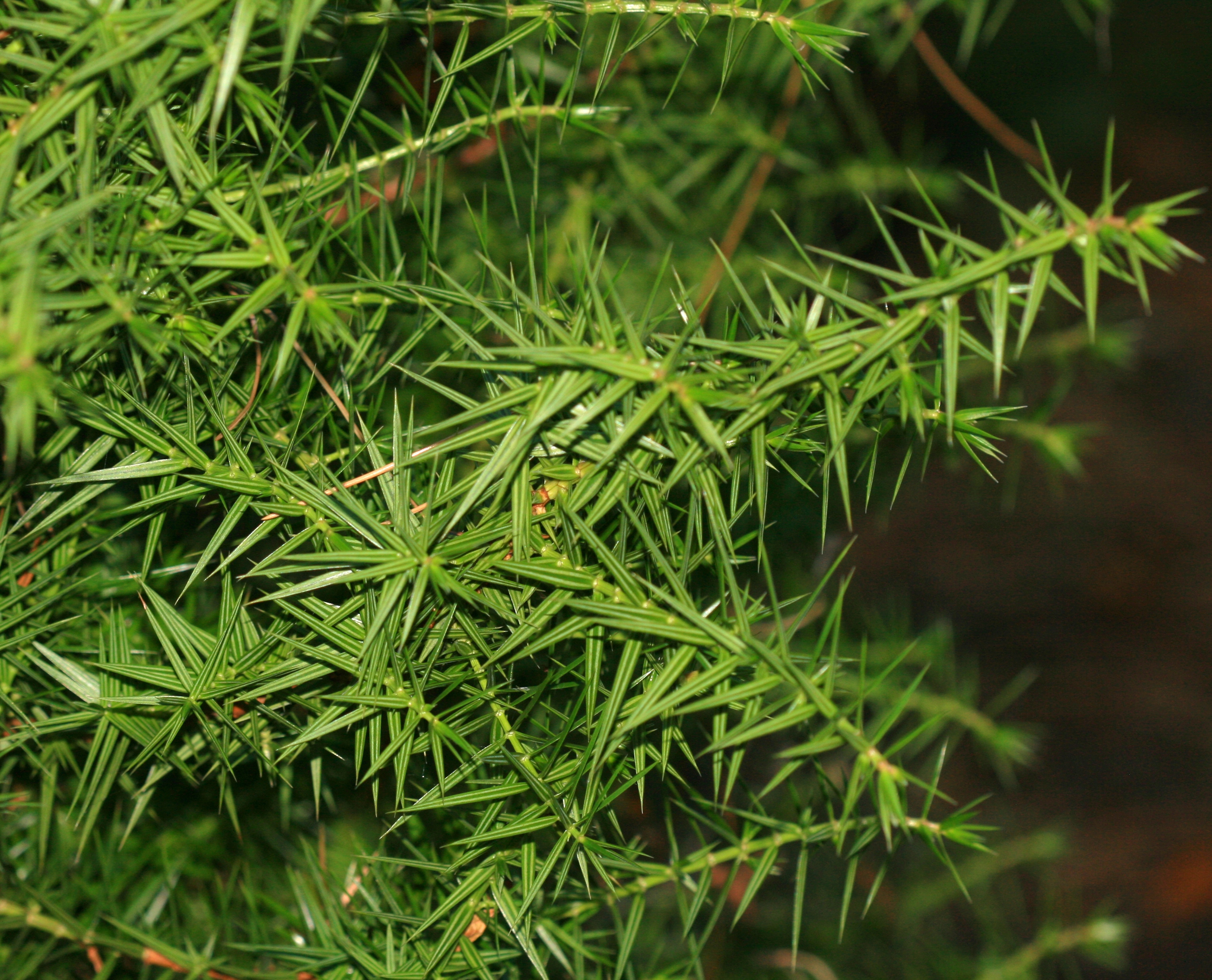
Foliage

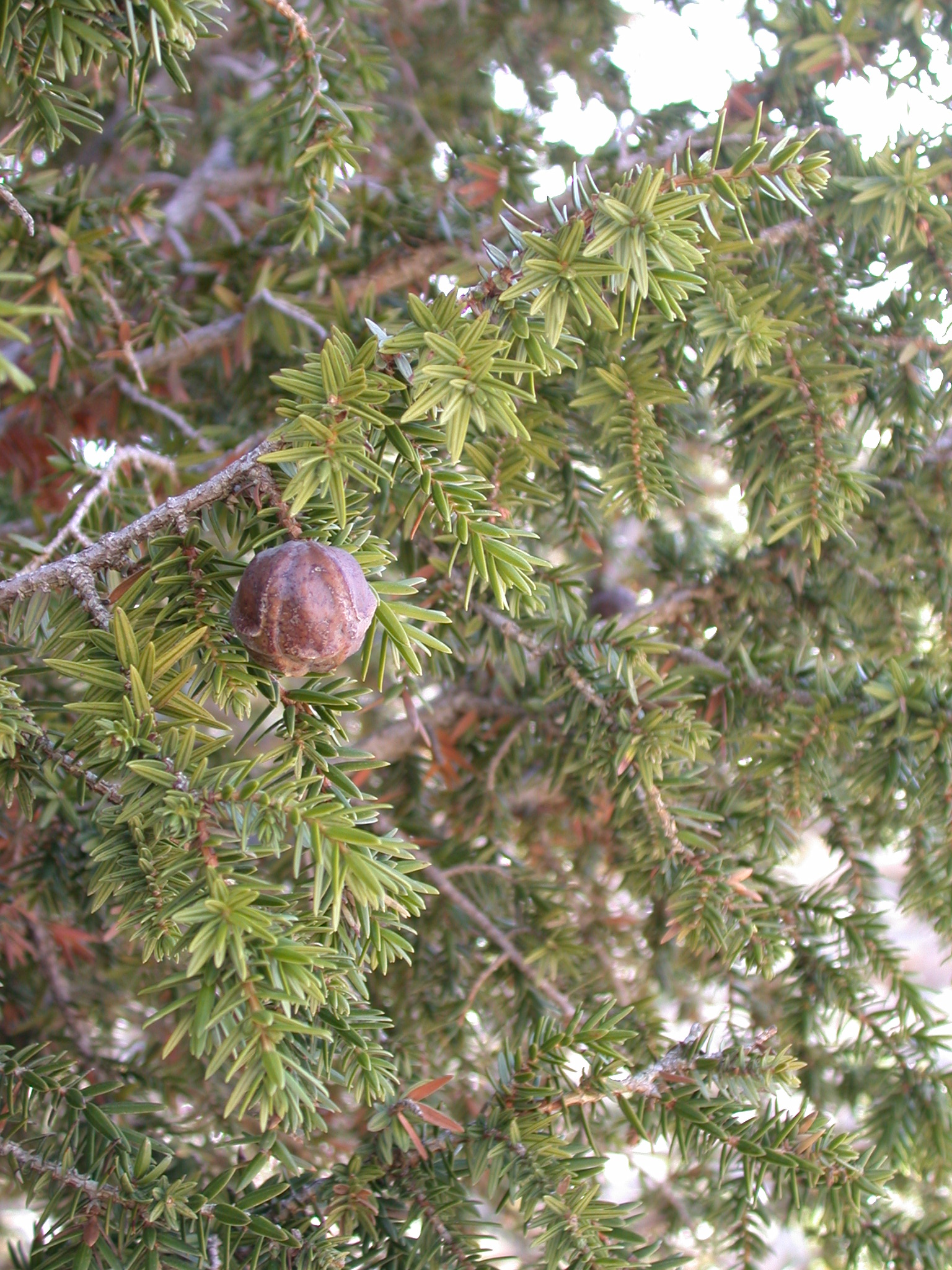
Branches in Israel

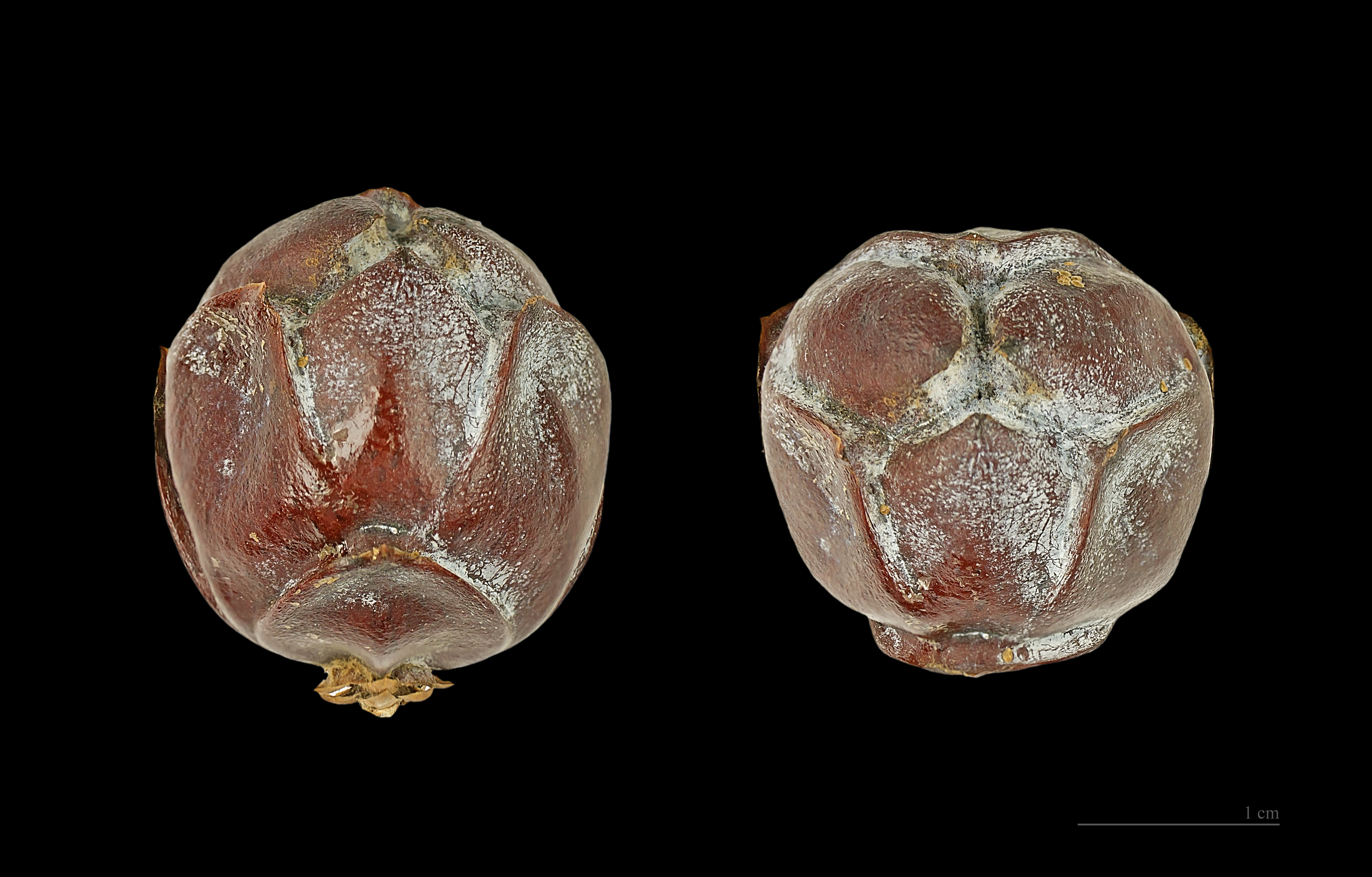
Two views of a cone

== Taxonomy ==
Because of its distinct cones with the seeds fused three together and the clustered male cones, it has sometimes been treated in a distinct genus of its own as Arceuthos drupacea (Labill.) Antoine & Kotschy, but genetic studies have shown it is fairly closely related to J. macrocarpa and J. oxycedrus.

== Culinary and Medicinal Uses ==
In Southeastern Turkey, on mountainsides of Enekli Tepe, the fruit is boiled into an edible concentrate, to be preserved, and then consumed. This solution is called pekmez, and in addition to being nutritious, and promoting energy, is seen as an aphrodisiac. It is also used to treat asthma.

Additional time-honoured medicinal uses for the tree in Turkey include treatment of haemorrhoids, stomach ailments, urinary infections, gout, wounds, diarrhoea, cough, and ordinary cold symptoms.
