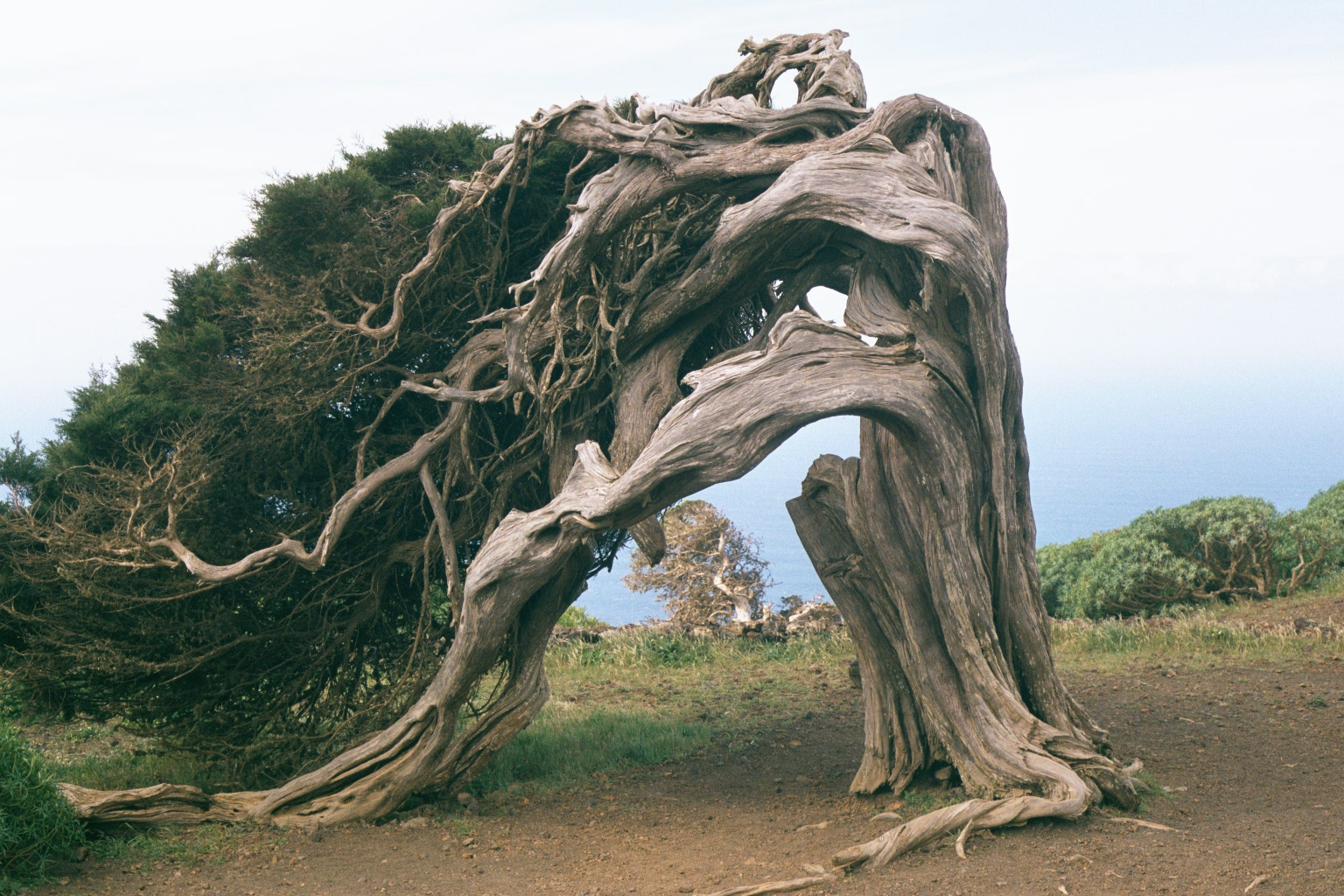
- Old specimen at El Sabinar, El Hierro, Canary Islands (Spain)

Scientific classification
- Kingdom: Plantae
- Clade: Tracheophytes
- Clade: Gymnospermae
- Division: Pinophyta
- Class: Pinopsida
- Order: Cupressales
- Family: Cupressaceae
- Genus: Juniperus
- Section: Juniperus sect. Sabina
- Species: J. canariensis

Binomial name
- Juniperus canariensis Guyot & Mathou
- Natural range

Synonyms
- Juniperus phoenicea subsp. canariensis (Guyot & Mathou) D.Pav., Véla & Médail; Juniperus turbinata subsp. canariensis (Guyot & Mathou) Rivas Mart., Wildpret & P.Pérez

= Juniperus canariensis =

Species of conifer

Juniperus canariensis is a woody plant in the family Cupressaceae native to the Canary Islands and Madeira, off the coast of Northwestern Africa.

The species was previously treated as part of Juniperus phoenicea, which is now regarded as restricted to Spain and France, and later, as J. phoenicea was split into J. phoenicea and J. turbinata, as part of J. turbinata, which is found throughout the Mediterranean and in the Arabian Peninsula.

Studies published in 2017 and 2018 on the genetic and morphological differences found within the J. phoenicea species complex showed that the Macaronesian population merited a status equivalent to that of J. phoenicea (sensu stricto) and J. turbinata.
