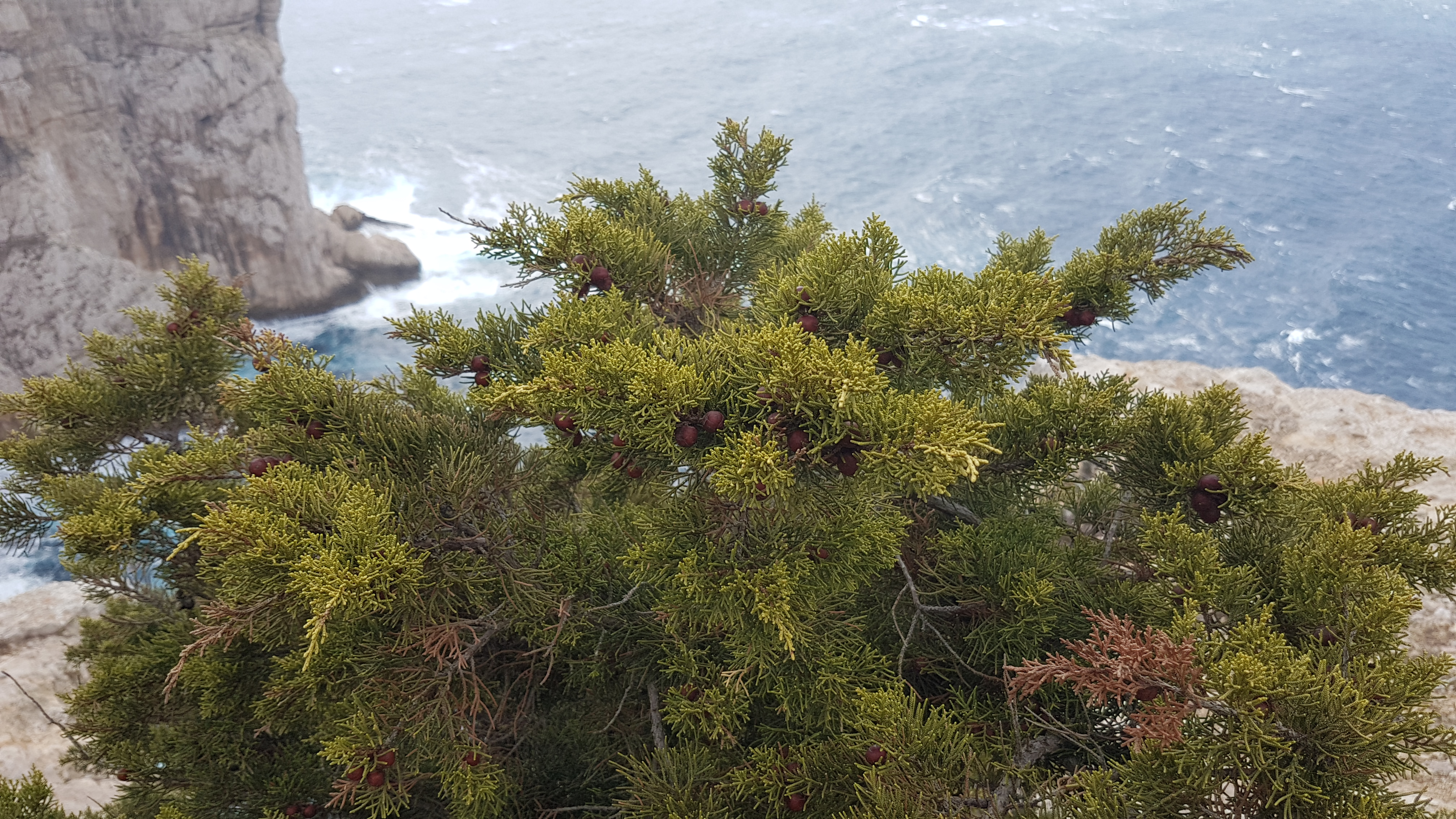
- Capo Caccia, Sardinia

Conservation status
- Near Threatened (IUCN 3.1)

Scientific classification
- Kingdom: Plantae
- Clade: Tracheophytes
- Clade: Gymnospermae
- Division: Pinophyta
- Class: Pinopsida
- Order: Cupressales
- Family: Cupressaceae
- Genus: Juniperus
- Section: Juniperus sect. Sabina
- Species: J. turbinata

Binomial name
- Juniperus turbinata Guss.
- Natural range

Synonyms
- List: Juniperus phoenicea var. turbinata (Guss.) Parl.; Juniperus phoenicea subsp. turbinata (Guss.) Nyman; Sabina turbinata (Guss.) Antoine; Cupressus devoniana Beissn.; Juniperus lycia L.; Juniperus oophora Kunze; Juniperus phoenicea subsp. eumediterranea P.Lebreton & Thivend; Juniperus phoenicea var. lobelii Guss.; Juniperus phoenicea var. lycia (L.) St.-Lag.; Juniperus phoenicea var. macrocarpa St.-Lag.; Juniperus phoenicea var. malacocarpa Endl.; Juniperus phoenicea f. megalocarpa Maire; Juniperus phoenicea f. prostrata Debreczy & I.Rácz; Juniperus phoenicea var. sclerocarpa Endl.; Oxycedrus licia Garsault; Sabina lycia (L.) Antoine

= Juniperus turbinata =

Species of conifer

Juniperus turbinata is a woody plant in the family Cupressaceae.

The species was previously treated as part of Juniperus phoenicea, which is now regarded as restricted to Spain and France, whereas J. turbinata is found throughout the Mediterranean and in the Arabian Peninsula. As of 2023, plants occurring in the Canary Islands, previously considered as part of the same species, are treated as the separate species J. canariensis.

== Description ==
Juniperus turbinata resembles J. phoenicea. It is a shrub or small tree up to 8 metres (26 feet) in height. The smaller branches have reddish bark. The adult leaves are scale-like, closely pressed to the twigs. Pollen is produced in the autumn (October to November), rather than in spring as in J. phoenicea. The seed cones are 7–11 millimetres (1/4–3/8 inch) long (longer than in J. phoenicea), and somewhat elongated, especially when immature. Each cone typically has 7–9 seeds (fewer than J. phoenicea).

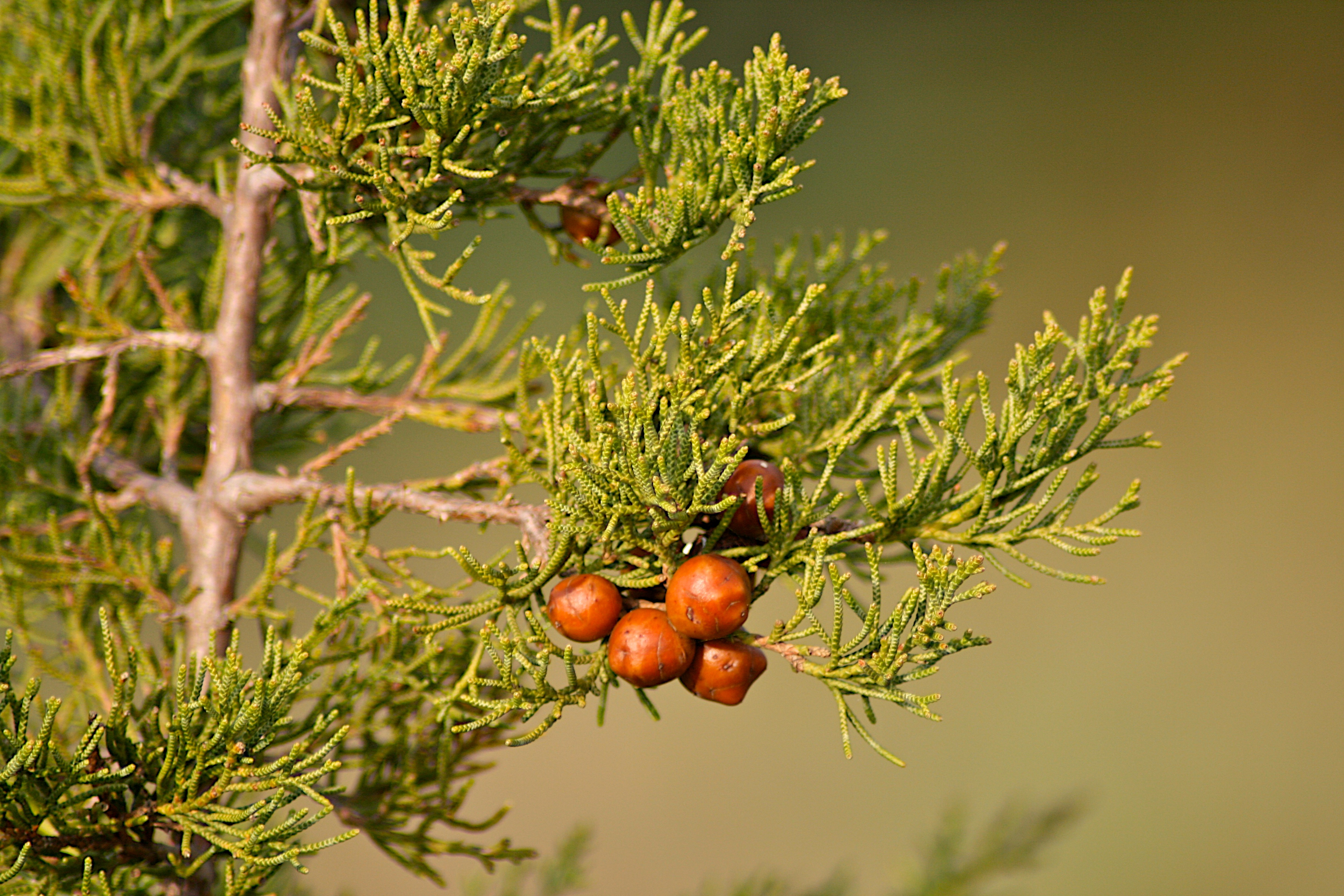
Foliage and cones

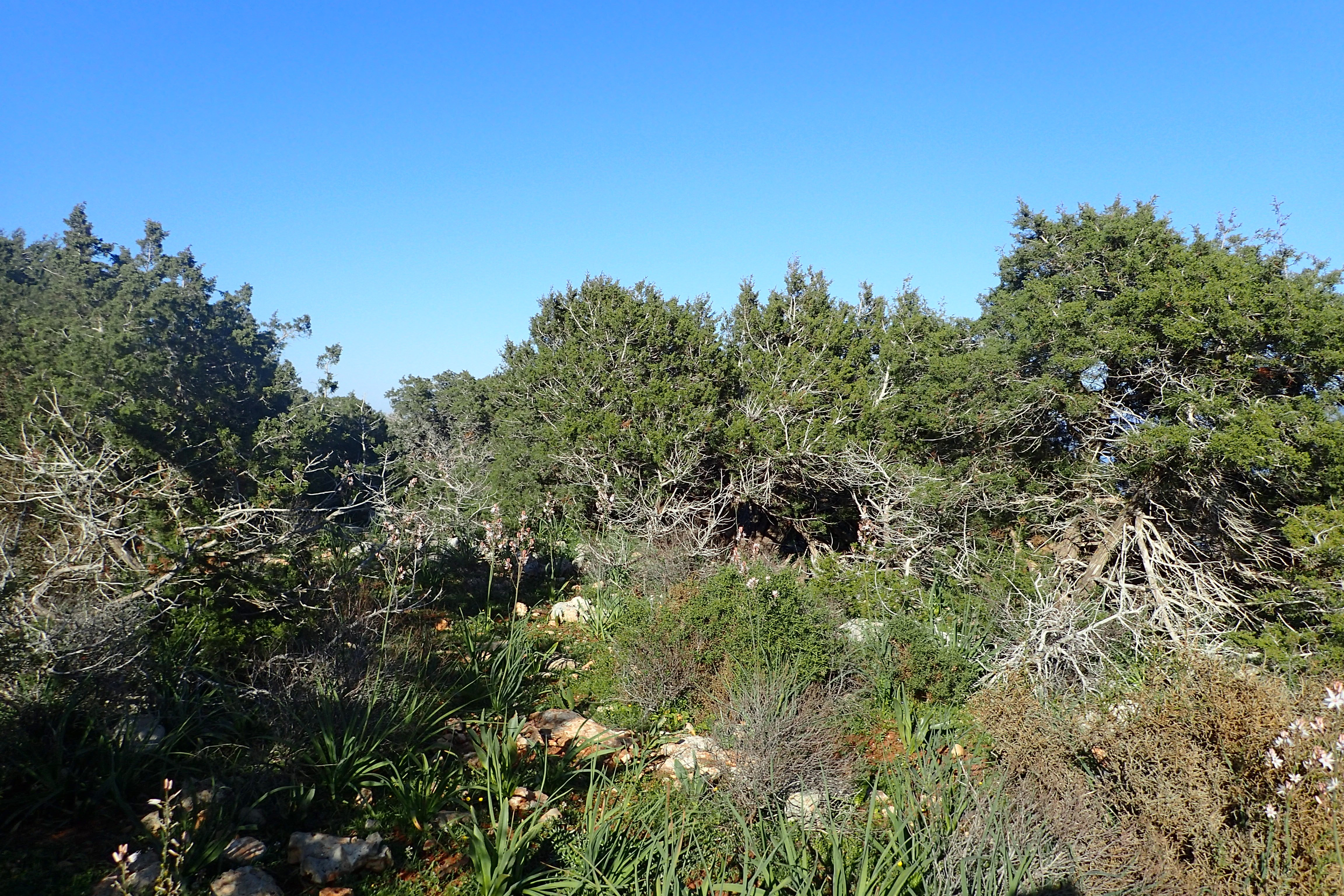
In maquis shrubland habitat

== Taxonomy ==
J. turbinata was first described by Giovanni Gussone in 1844. It has been treated as a variety or subspecies of J. phoenicea. DNA from populations previously assigned to J. phoenicea var. phoenicea and J. phoenicea var. turbinata was studied, and the results were published in 2013. It was found that the two taxa were clearly separated, and hence best treated as two species.

== Distribution and habitat ==
J. turbinata has a native distribution throughout the Mediterranean and in the Arabian Peninsula. It is known from southwestern and southeastern Europe, North Africa, and parts of western Asia (Cyprus, the east Aegean Islands, Lebanon and Syria, the region of Palestine, the Sinai Peninsula) and northwestern Arabian Peninsula (Saudi Arabia). It favours soils that are composed of sand, Cambrian limestone or volcanic rock.
