= Tour de Diana =

Genoese coastal defence tower in Corsica

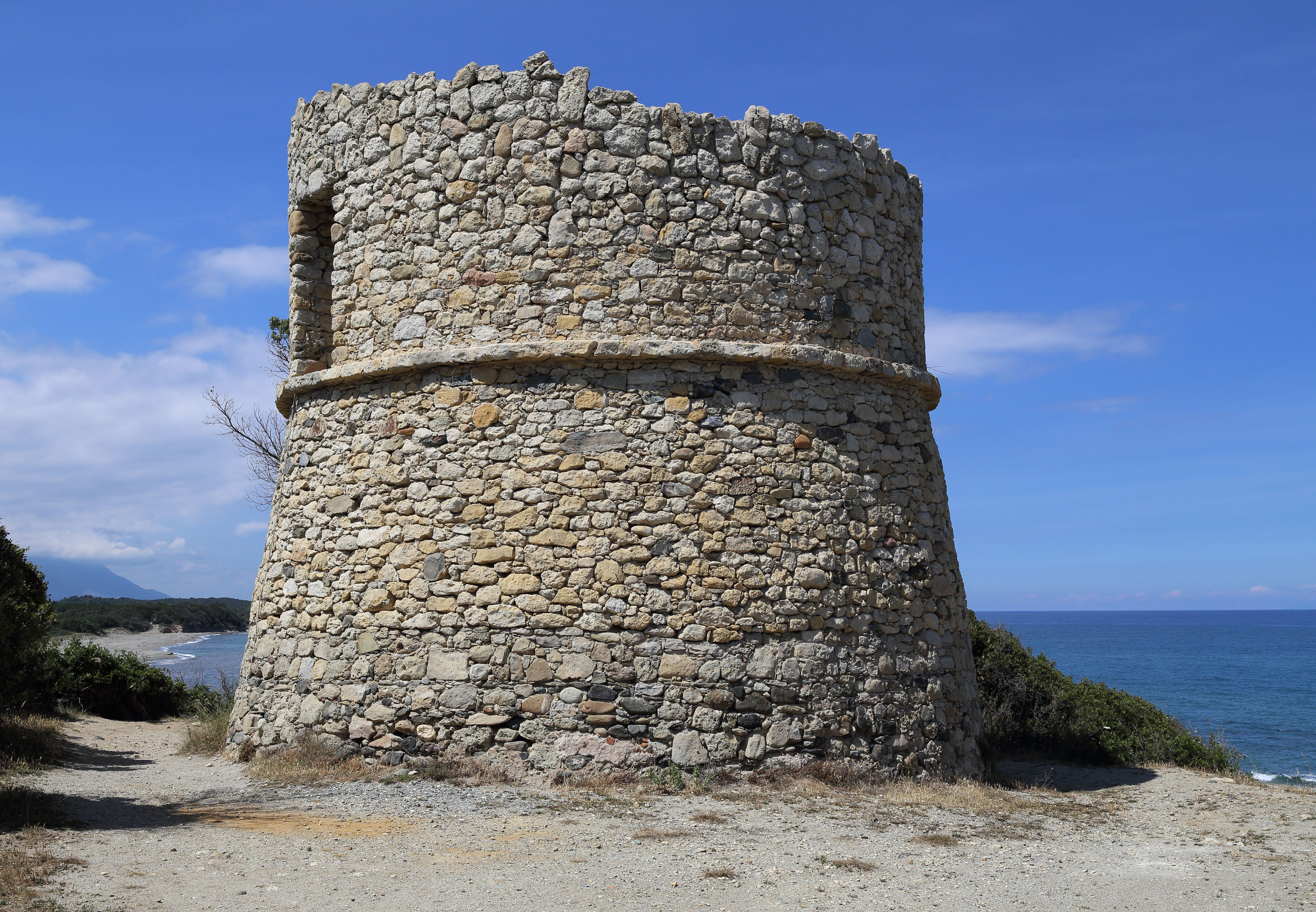

- Location within Corsica
- 42°8′31.55″N 9°33′21.33″E

History
- Built: circa 1582

The Tour de Diana (Corsican: Torra di Diana) is a ruined Genoese tower located in the commune of Aléria on east coast of the French island of Corsica. It sits on a spit of land that forms the southern entrance to the Étang de Diane.

The Tour de Diana was built in around 1582 under the direction of a notable from Bastia, Mariano de Murato. It was one of a series of coastal defences constructed by the Republic of Genoa between 1530 and 1620 to stem the attacks by Barbary pirates. An inventory of the coastal towers produced by the Genoese authorities in 1617 lists the Tour de Diana as being guarded by two soldiers from the Fort d'Aléria (Fort Matra) but by around 1670 the tower was in a ruined state.

== See also ==
- List of Genoese towers in Corsica
