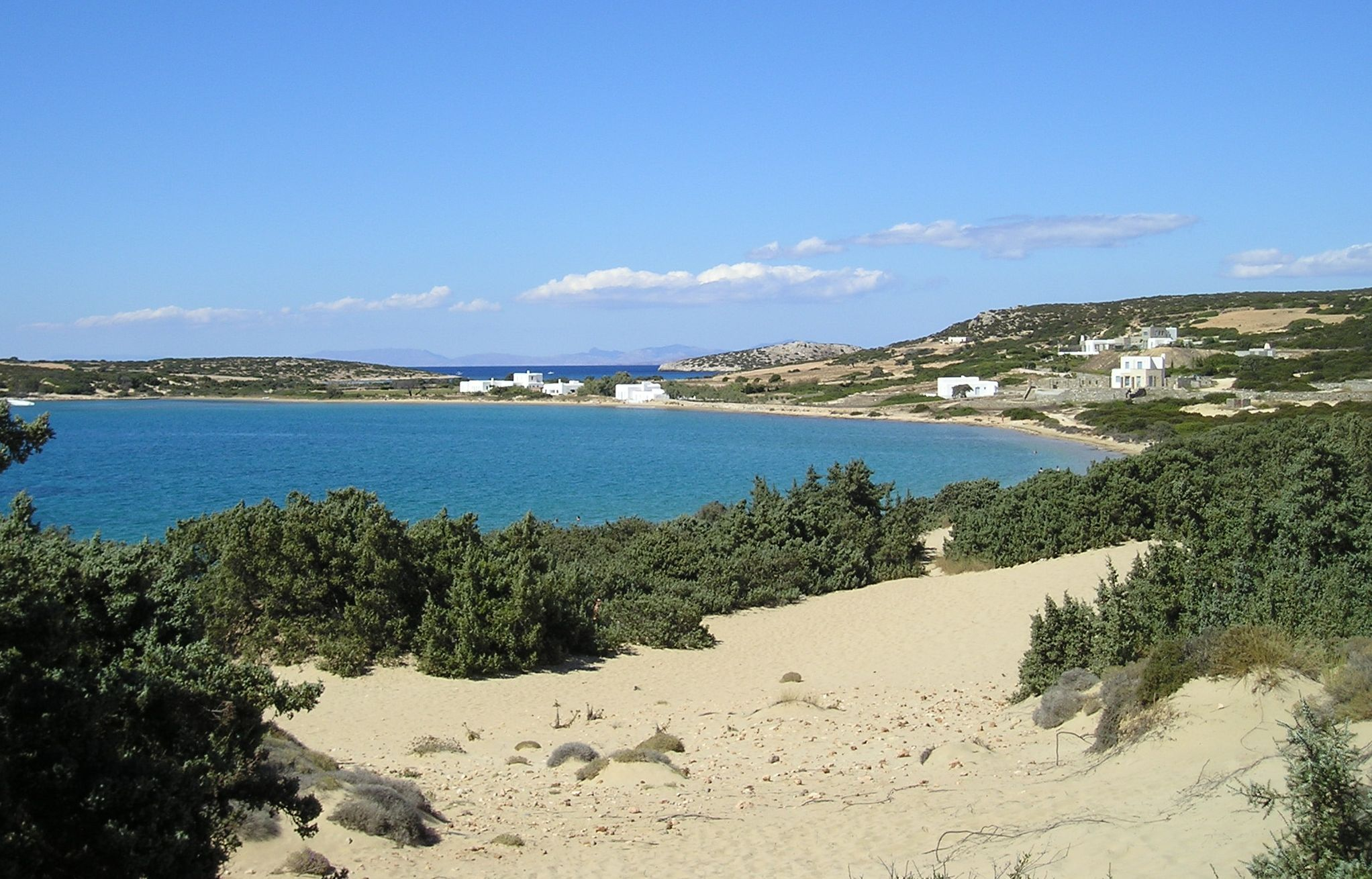
- Juniperus macrocarpa in sand dune habitat, Paros Island, Greece

Conservation status
- Least Concern (IUCN 3.1)

Scientific classification
- Kingdom: Plantae
- Clade: Tracheophytes
- Clade: Gymnospermae
- Division: Pinophyta
- Class: Pinopsida
- Order: Cupressales
- Family: Cupressaceae
- Genus: Juniperus
- Section: Juniperus sect. Juniperus
- Species: J. macrocarpa

Binomial name
- Juniperus macrocarpa Sibth. & Sm.

= Juniperus macrocarpa =

Species of conifer

Juniperus macrocarpa (large-fruited juniper, syn. J. oxycedrus subsp. macrocarpa (Sibth. & Sm.) Ball) is a species of juniper, native across the northern Mediterranean Region from southwestern Spain east to western Turkey and Cyprus, growing on coastal sand dunes from sea level up to 75 metres (246 feet) in altitude. A single, isolated tree is found further west, in a cliff in southern Portugal.

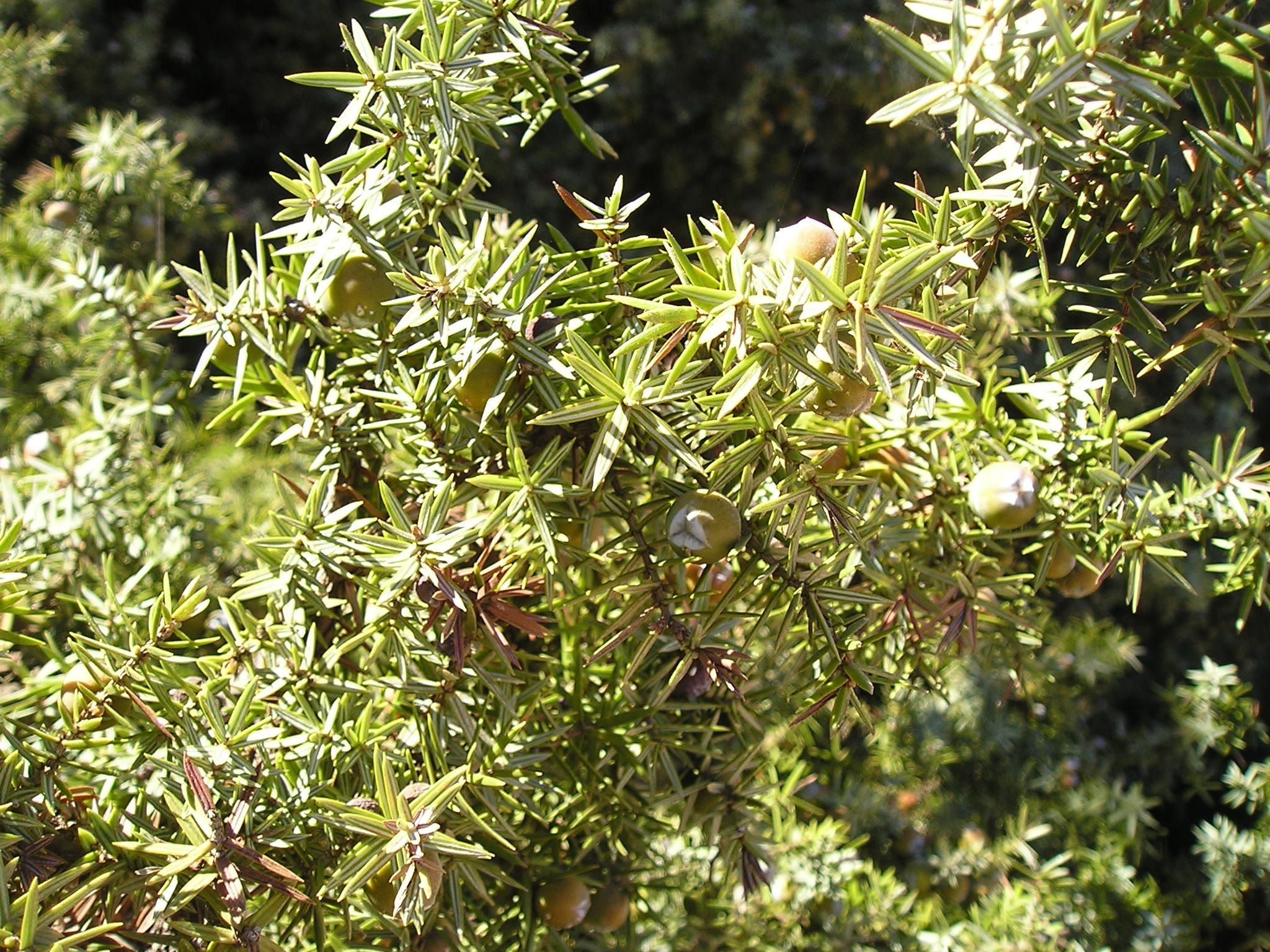
Foliage and immature cones, Paros Island, Greece

It is a spreading shrub 2–5 m (6 1/2–16 1/2 ft) tall, rarely a small tree up to 14 m (46 ft) tall. The leaves are broad lanceolate, produced in whorls of three, green, 12–20 millimetres (1/2–3/4 in) long and 2–3 mm broad, with a double white stomatal band split by a green midrib on the inner surface. It is dioecious, with separate male and female plants. The seed cones are berry-like, green ripening in 18 months to orange-red with a variable pink waxy coating; they are spherical, 12–18 mm diameter, and have six fused scales in two whorls, three of the scales with a single seed. The seeds are dispersed when birds eat the cones, digesting the fleshy scales and passing the hard seeds in their droppings. The pollen cones are yellow, 2–3 mm long, and fall soon after shedding their pollen in late winter.

Despite its distinct morphology with large cones and broad leaves more like those of Juniperus drupacea, it has often been treated as a subspecies of Juniperus oxycedrus, though recent genetic studies have shown its DNA is distinct from that of J. oxycedrus.
