= Juniper berry =

Spice, herbal drug

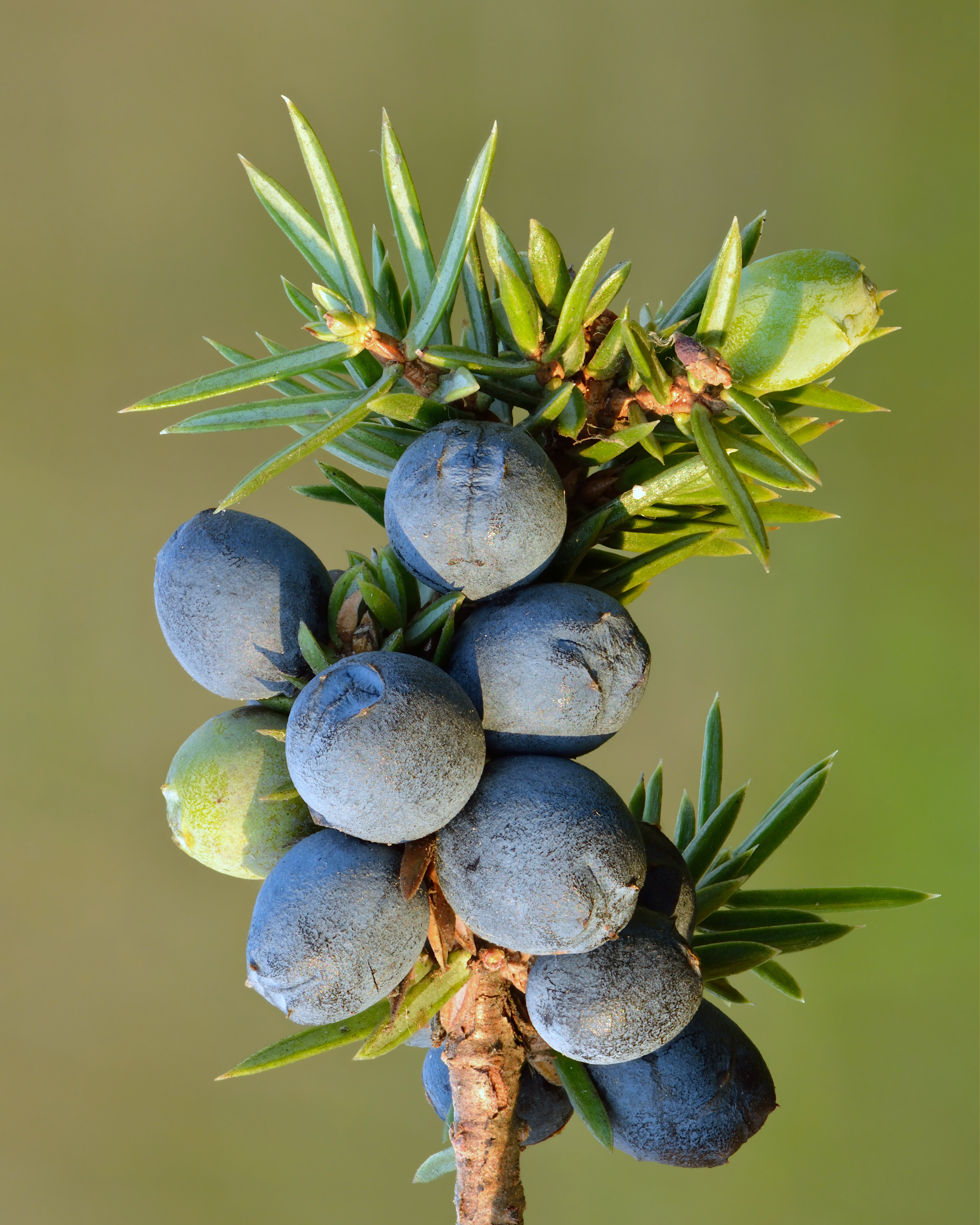
Juniper berries are actually modified conifer cones.

A juniper berry is the female seed cone produced by the various species of junipers. It is not a true berry but a cone with unusually fleshy and merged scales called a galbulus, which gives it a berry-like appearance. The cones from a handful of species, especially Juniperus communis, are used as a spice, particularly in European cuisine, and also give gin its distinctive flavour. Juniper berries are among the few spices derived from conifers, along with spruce buds.

== Description ==
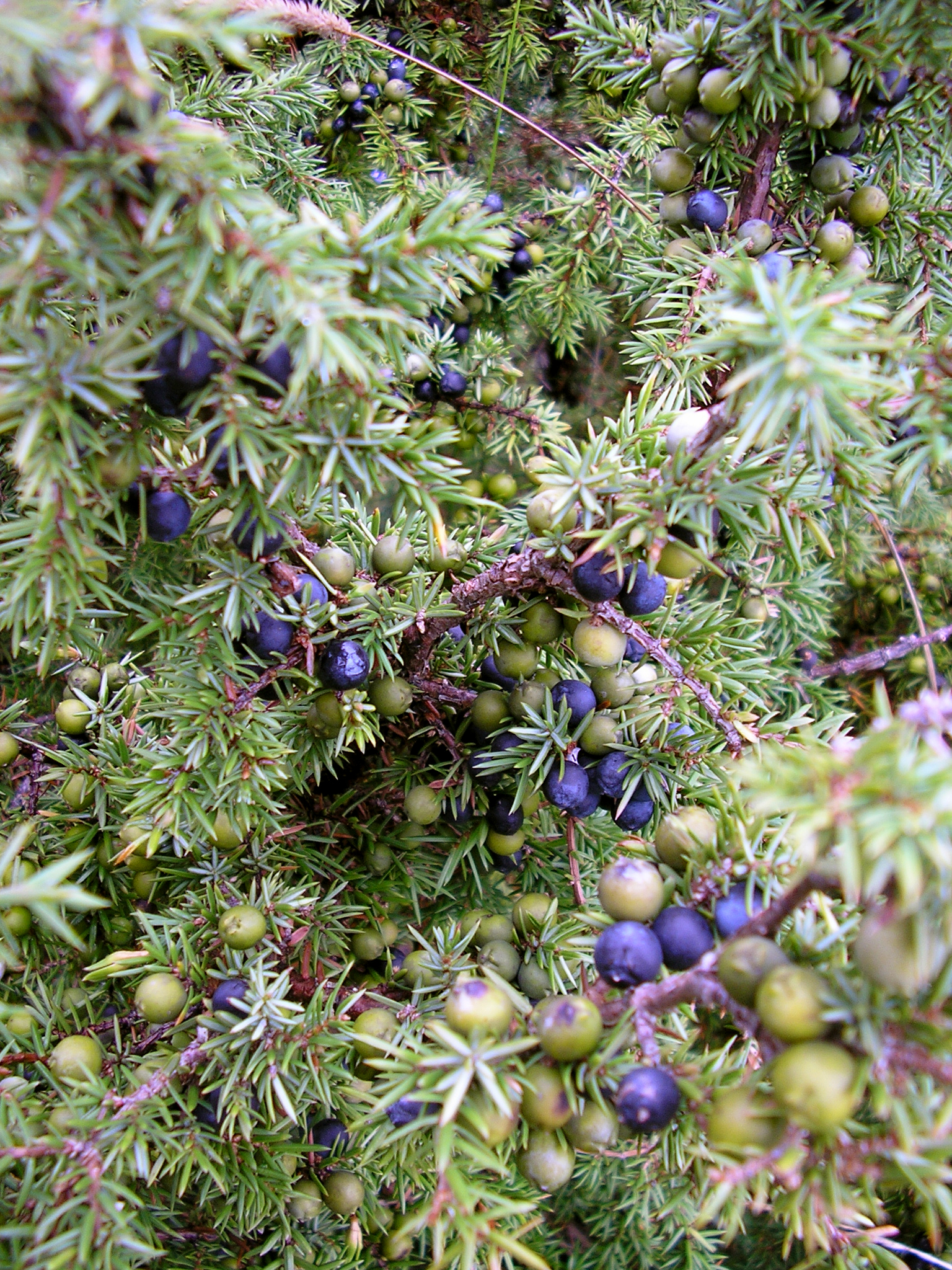
Young green and mature purple berries can be seen growing on the same plant.

Unlike the separated and woody scales of a typical pine cone, those in a juniper berry remain fleshy and merge into a unified covering surrounding the seeds. Juniper berries are sometimes regarded as arils, like the berry-like cones of yews. Juniperus communis berries vary from 4 millimetres (1/8 inch) to 12 millimetres (1/2 inch) in diameter; Other species are mostly similar in size, though some are larger, notably J. drupacea (20–28 mm or 3/4–1 1/8 in). The berries are green when young and mature to purple-black over about 18 months in most species, including J. communis. Maturation occurs from as little as 8–10 months in some species up to over 24 months in J. drupacea. The mature, dark berries are usually (but not exclusively) used in cuisine, while gin is flavoured with fully grown, unripe berries.

=== Chemistry ===
Juniper berries contain diverse phytochemicals, including an essential oil in about 2% volume, a flavonoid called juniperin, resins (about 10% of volume), proteins, and acetic, malic and formic acids. From extracts of the berries, fatty acids, terpenes, aromatic compounds, and hydrocarbons, such as pinene, sabinene, terpinen-4-ol, limonene, and myrcene, were isolated.

== Toxicity ==
While classified as generally recognized as safe in the United States, juniper berries may have various side effects that have not been tested extensively in clinical trials. Mainly due to an increased risk of miscarriage, even in small doses, consuming juniper berries may affect pregnant or breastfeeding women.

Allergic reactions are possible. Consuming large amounts of juniper berries may cause catharsis, convulsions, or harm kidney function. The berries of some species, such as J. sabina, are toxic.

== Uses ==
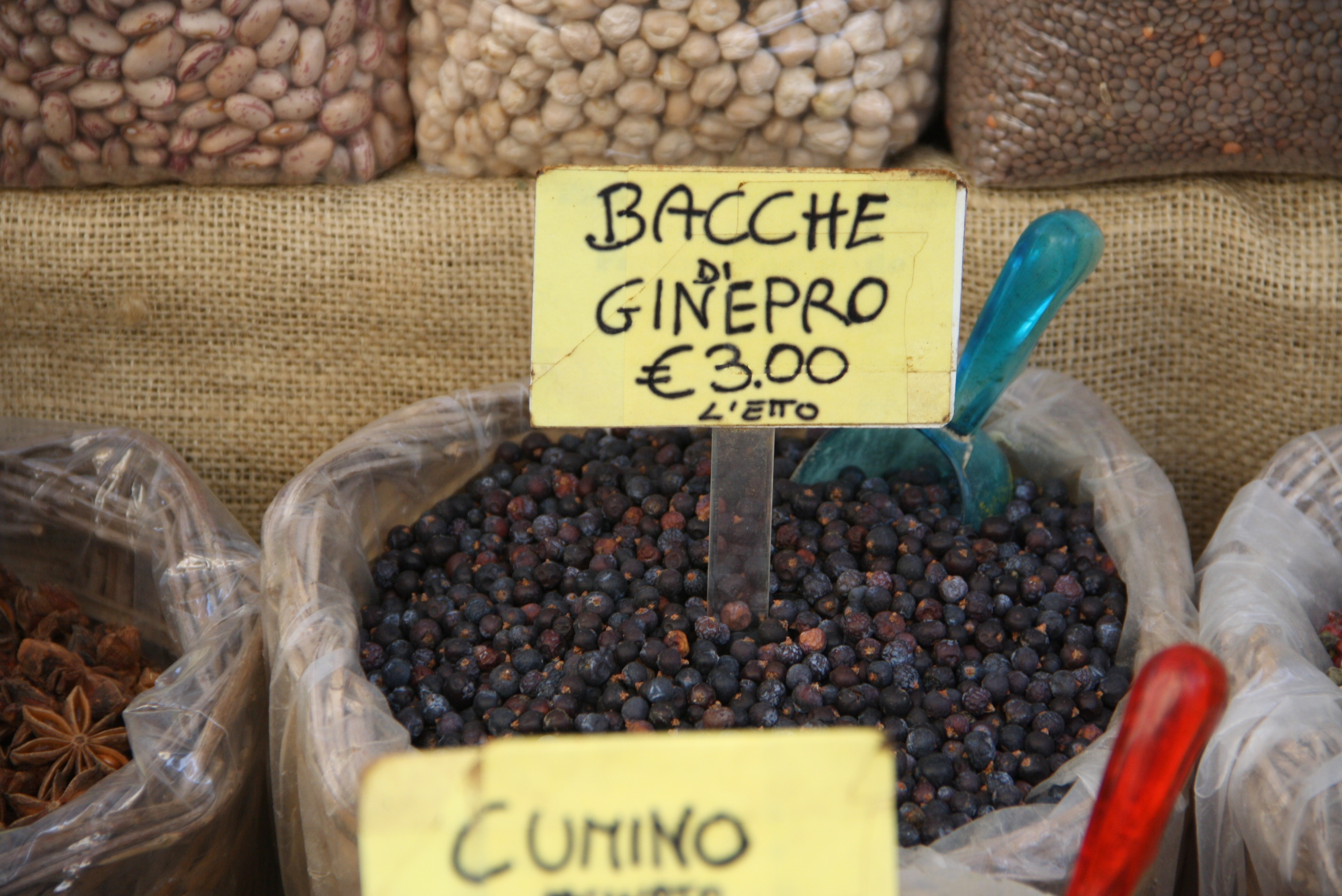
Dried juniper berries at a market in Syracuse, Sicily

The berries of some juniper species are considered too bitter to eat.

In addition to J. communis and J. drupacea, edible species include J. phoenicea, J. deppeana, and J. californica.

The flavour profile of young, green berries is dominated by pinene; as they mature this piney, resinous backdrop is joined by what Harold McGee describes as "green-fresh" and citrus notes. The outer scales of the berries are relatively flavourless, so the berries are almost always at least lightly crushed before being used as a spice. They are used both fresh and dried, but their flavour and odour are at their strongest immediately after harvest and decline during drying and storage.

=== Flavour ===
Juniper berries are used in northern European and particularly Nordic cuisine to, according to one source, "impart a sharp, clear flavor" to meat dishes, especially wild birds (including thrush, blackbird, and woodcock) and game meats (including boar and venison). They also season pork, cabbage, and sauerkraut dishes. Traditional recipes for choucroute garnie, an Alsatian dish of sauerkraut and meats, universally include juniper berries. Besides Norwegian, Danish, Estonian and Swedish dishes, juniper berries are also sometimes used in German, Austrian, Czech, Polish and Hungarian cuisine, often with roasts (such as German sauerbraten). Northern Italian cuisine, especially that of the South Tyrol, also incorporates juniper berries. They are also used in the Italian region of Apulia, especially to flavour brines.

Juniper, typically J. communis, is used to flavor gin, a liquor developed in the 17th century in the Netherlands. The name gin itself is derived from either the French genièvre or the Dutch jenever, both of which mean "juniper". Other juniper-flavoured beverages include the Finnish rye-and-juniper beer known as sahti, which is flavored with both juniper berries and branches.

Another drink made from the berries is julmust, a soft drink made in Sweden mainly sold during Christmas.

=== Food ===
A few North American juniper species produce a seed cone with a sweeter, less resinous flavor than those typically used as a spice. For example, one field guide describes the flesh of the berries of J. californica as "dry, mealy, and fibrous but sweet and without resin cells". Such species have been used not just as a seasoning but as a nutritive food by some Native Americans. The berries also have medicinal uses. For example, the Blackfoot used juniper berry tea to cure vomiting, while Crow women drank juniper berry tea after childbirth to increase cleansing and healing. In addition to medicinal and culinary purposes, Native Americans have also used the seeds inside juniper berries as beads for jewellery and decoration.

An essential oil extracted from juniper berries is used in aromatherapy, both for body massage, diffusion, and perfumery. The terpenic aroma is described as "fresh, balsamic, terpenic, woody, carrot seed, fir needle, peppery".

== Culture ==
Juniper berries, including Juniperus phoenicea and J. oxycedrus, have been found in ancient Egyptian tombs at multiple sites. J. oxycedrus is not known to grow in Egypt, and neither is J. excelsa, which was found along with J. oxycedrus in the tomb of Tutankhamun. The berries imported into Egypt may have come from Greece; the Greeks record using juniper berries as a medicine long before mentioning their use in food.

The Greeks used the berries in many of their Olympics events because of their belief that the berries increased physical stamina in athletes.

The Romans used juniper berries as a cheap domestically produced substitute for the expensive black pepper and long pepper imported from India. It was also used as an adulterant, as reported in Pliny the Elder's Natural History: "pepper is adulterated with juniper berries, which have the property, to a marvellous degree, of assuming the pungency of pepper". Pliny also incorrectly asserted that black pepper grew on trees that were "very similar in appearance to our junipers".

The berries were an integral part of Desert Serrano (Vanyume) culture and grew throughout the Mojave River region. The major village of Wá’peat was derived from the Serrano word for juniper berries, wa'at.
