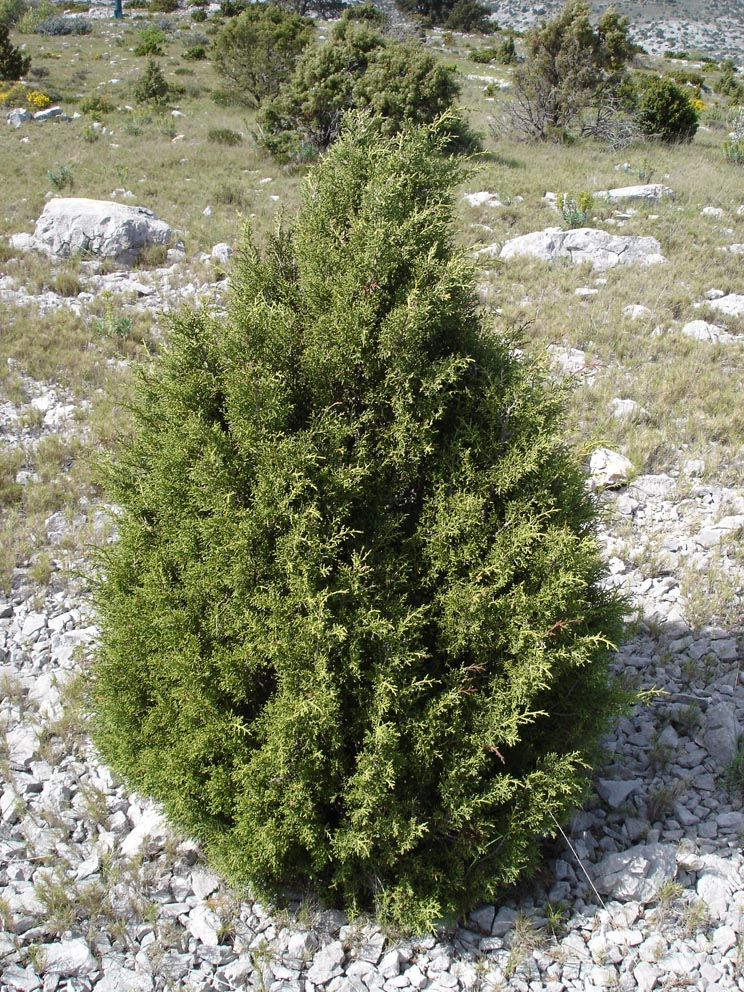
- Specimen from Roussillon, France

Conservation status
- Least Concern (IUCN 3.1)

Scientific classification
- Kingdom: Plantae
- Clade: Tracheophytes
- Clade: Gymnosperms
- Division: Pinophyta
- Class: Pinopsida
- Order: Cupressales
- Family: Cupressaceae
- Genus: Juniperus
- Section: Juniperus sect. Sabina
- Species: J. phoenicea

Binomial name
- Juniperus phoenicea L.
- Natural range

Synonyms
- Cupressus devoniana Beissn.; Cupressus tetragona Humb. & Bonpl. ex Carrière; Juniperus bacciformis Carrière; Juniperus divaricata Carrière nom. inval.; Juniperus formosa Carrière nom. inval.; Juniperus langoldiana Gordon; Juniperus malacocarpa Carrière; Juniperus myosuros Sénécl.; Juniperus myurus Beissn.; Juniperus terminalis Salisb. nom. illeg.; Juniperus tetragona Moench nom. illeg.; Oxycedrus licia Garsault; Sabina bacciformis (Carrière) Antoine; Sabina lycia (L.) Antoine; Sabina phoenicea (L.) Antoine; Sabinella phoenicea (L.) Nakai

= Juniperus phoenicea =

Species of tree in the cypress family

Juniperus phoenicea, the Phoenicean juniper or Arâr, is a species of juniper found in the western Mediterranean region.

== Description ==
Juniperus phoenicea is a large evergreen shrub or small tree reaching 5–8 metres (16–26 feet) tall, with a trunk up to 1–2 m (3 1/2–6 1/2 ft) in diameter and a rounded or irregular crown. The bark, which can be peeled in strips, is dark grayish-brown. The leaves are of two forms, juvenile needle-like leaves 5–14 millimetres (1/4–1/2 in) long and 1 mm wide on seedlings, and adult scale-leaves 1–2 mm long on older plants with a green to blue-green color; they are arranged in opposite decussate pairs or whorls of three. It is largely monoecious, but some individual plants are dioecious. The female cones are berrylike, 6–14 mm in diameter, orange-brown, occasionally with a pinkish waxy bloom, and contain 3–8 seeds; they are mature in about 18 months, and are mainly dispersed by birds. The male cones are 2–4 mm long, and shed their pollen in early spring, which is then dispersed by wind.

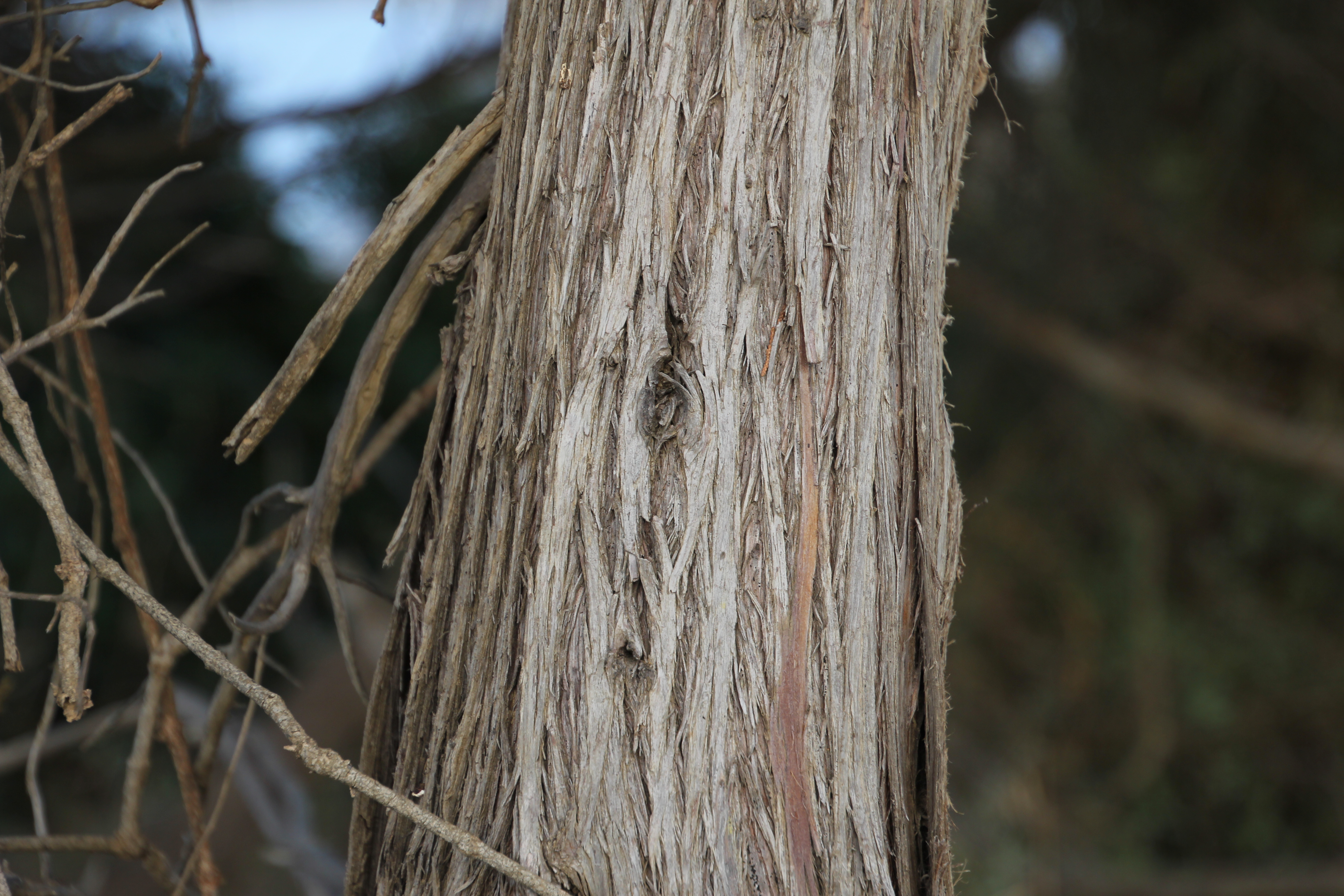
Trunk bark

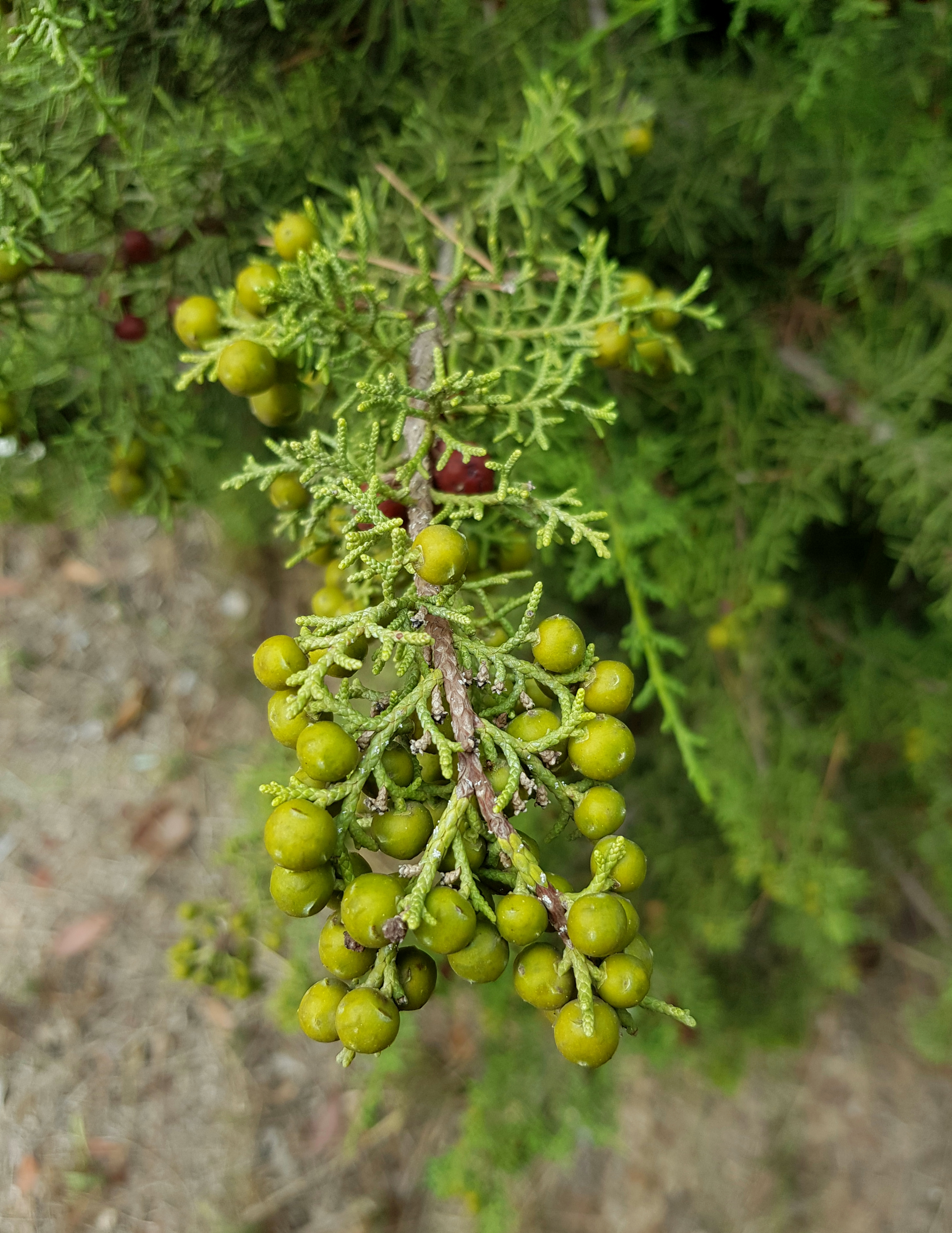
Unripe berries

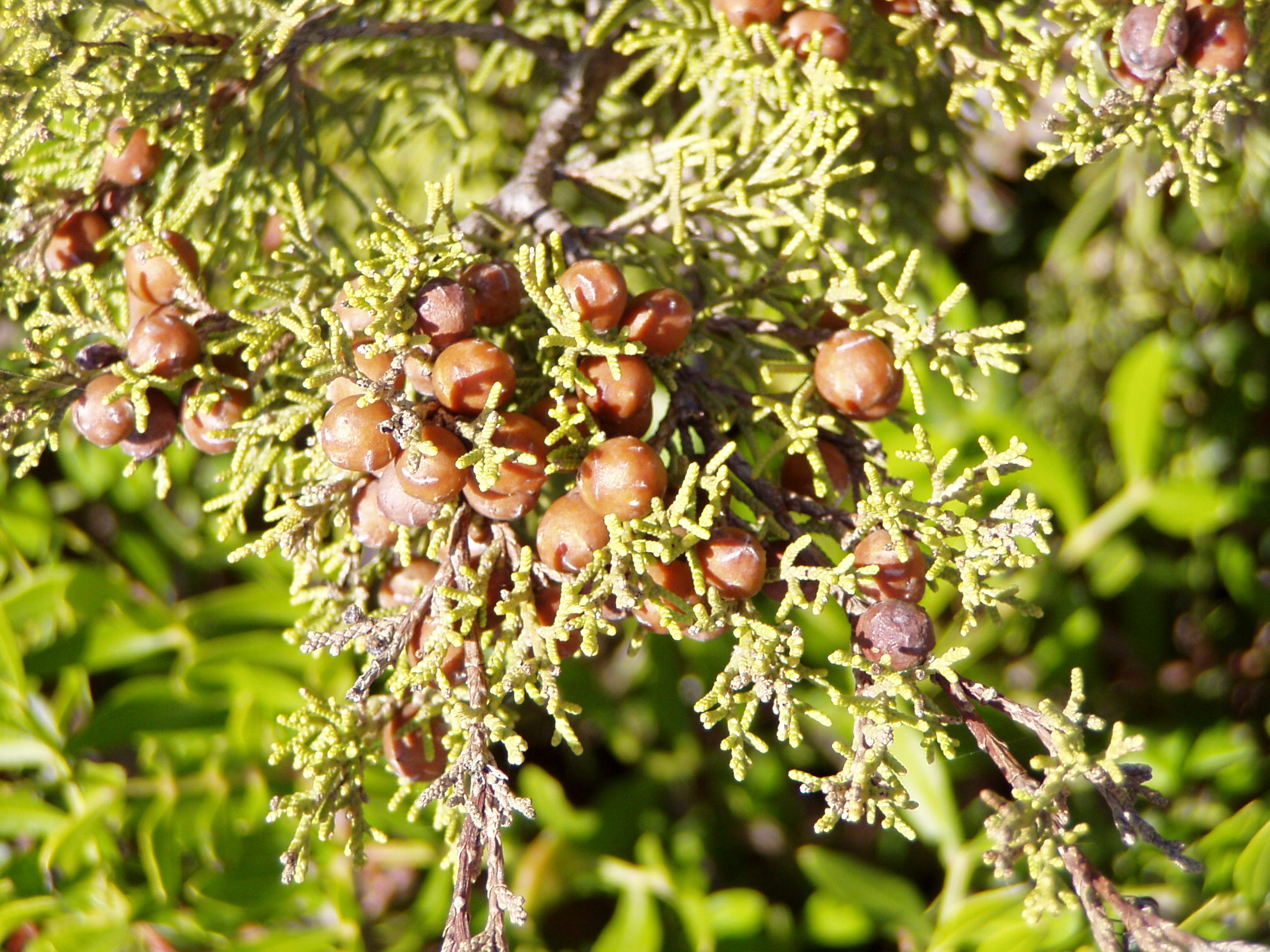
Foliage and ripe berries

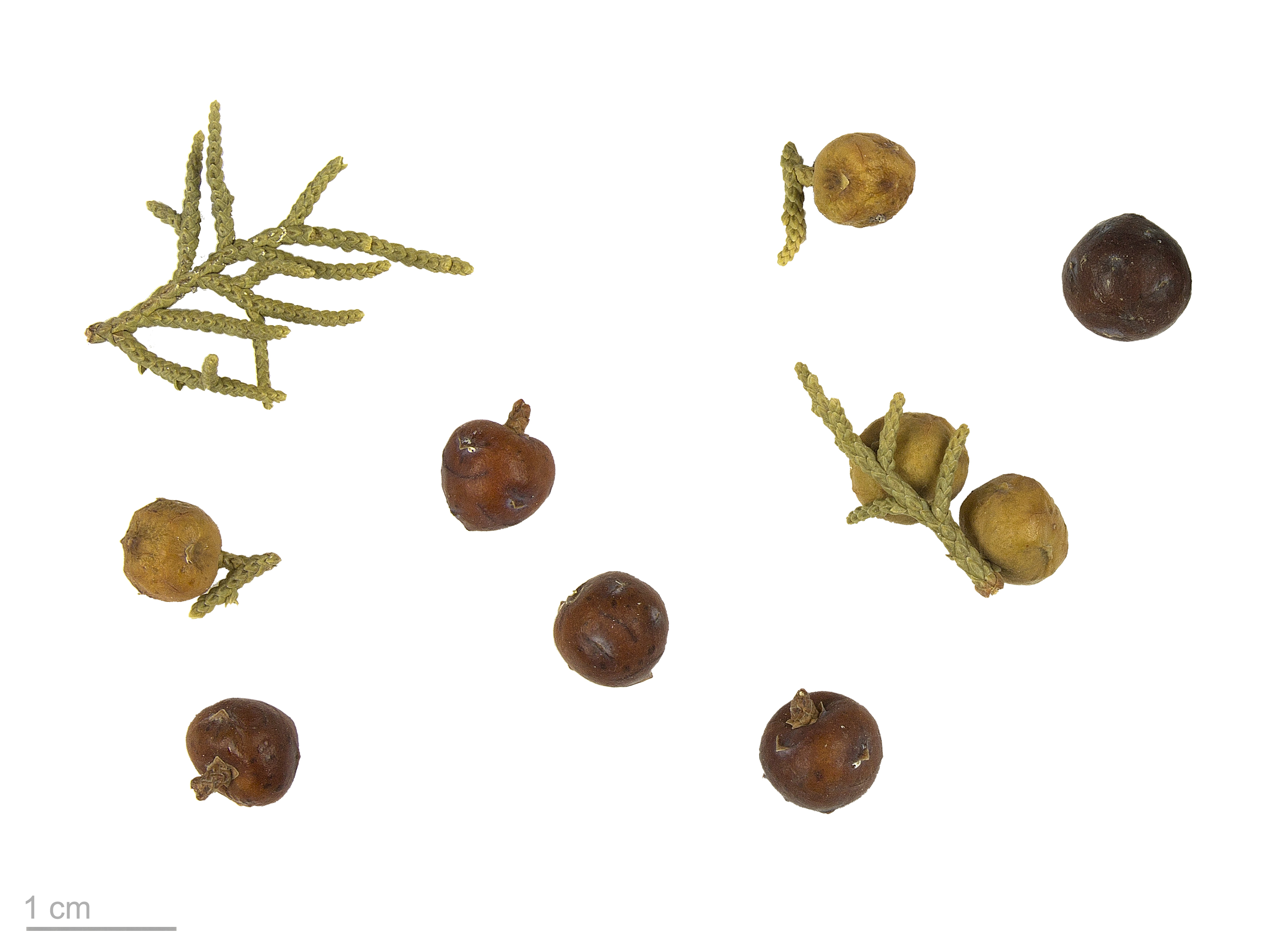
Isolated foliage and berries (Muséum de Toulouse)

== Taxonomy ==
The Phoenician juniper was historically treated as a species complex, encompassing a range of morphological and ecological variations often classified as subspecies or varieties. This traditional view recognized a broadly distributed species throughout the Mediterranean basin and Macaronesia. Contemporary genetic and morphological studies have necessitated a significant revision of this species complex. These phylogenetic analyses supported a clear differentiation among the previously grouped populations, leading to the separation of the complex into three distinct, recognized species:

- Juniperus phoenicea L. s.s. (sensu stricto): This species now typically refers to the populations found primarily in the western Mediterranean region.
- Juniperus turbinata Guss.: This species is recognized for populations distributed across the Mediterranean and western Saudi Arabia. It is often distinguished by its more turbinate (top-shaped) cones and differences in foliage.
- Juniperus canariensis Guyot & Mathou: This species is endemic to the Macaronesian archipelagos (primarily the Canary Islands and Madeira). Its distinction is strongly supported by genetic divergence reflecting its long-term isolation in these island environments.

This taxonomic reclassification provides a more accurate reflection of the evolutionary history and biogeographical segregation within the taxon, highlighting the distinct adaptive trajectories of the three newly accepted species.

== Distribution and habitat ==
The species is primarily distributed in the Western Mediterranean region and its core range is concentrated in Spain (principally the eastern provinces) and Southern France. Additional, often isolated, occurrences have been reported in other areas of the Western Mediterranean, including the Sierra de Tramuntana in Mallorca and Cabo Espichel in Portugal. In Italy, it is found in the western Maritime Alps, and the Apuan Alps, and has also been reported from Monte Albo in Sardinia.

This juniper generally occurs at elevations ranging from 50 to 100 m to about 1,600–1,800 m, with the largest concentration of localities found between 400 and 1,200 m. This distribution reflects its preference for inland, rocky, and sub-mountainous habitats, often on calcareous soils. The highest documented elevations for the species are 1,900 m in the Sierra Nevada and 1,970 m in the Sierra Mágina, both located in Spain.

== Ecology ==
The species prefers a hot, arid climate with a lot of light, and grows on rocky or sandy ground. Its preferred soil is calcareous with a pH between 7.7 and 7.9 (moderately basic), but could also be silicate. Despite having a shallow root system, it can survive with as little as 200 mm (8 in) of rain per year. It can often be found forming scrubs and thickets with other species. In its natural range of France and Spain, J. phoenicea has a generational life of 25 years, and is considered a stable species on the 2016 IUCN Red List of Threatened Species.

Its habitat in coastal areas is most threatened by the presence of humans, both settled and touring. Humans also plant not-naturally-present plants such as pines, black locust, French tamarisk, desert false Indigo, American agave, tree of heaven, and some succulent plants from South Africa. The purpose of this is usually to stabilize the dunes, but these outside plants interfere with the natural vegetation. It is also threatened easily by fires, because it is quite flammable and does not regenerate well. This makes it necessary to plant new organisms after a fire has damaged the others.

== Uses ==
Juniper berries are used as a seasoning in cooking or in alcoholic beverages, particularly to flavor gin. Juniper berries have also been used in traditional medicine for different conditions, although there is no high-quality clinical evidence that it has any effect. Although extracts of juniper berries or wood tar have been used as an aroma – particularly for cosmetics – the safety of using ointments manufactured from J. phoenicea and related species has not been adequately demonstrated, according to a 2001 review. Juniper extracts used topically may cause skin allergic reactions, and should be avoided during pregnancy.

The tree's essential oil is especially rich in the tricyclic sesquiterpene thujopsene. The heartwood contains an estimated 2.2% of thujopsene; this explains the superior natural durability of the wood itself. The biochemist Jarl Runeburg noted in 1960 that J. phoenicea appears to be the most convenient source of thujopsene so far encountered." Juniper wood is used for small manufactured objects and inlay works in carpentry, and in building construction in Africa where it is mainly used for fuel and producing charcoal.

== Culture ==
It is the vegetable symbol of the island of El Hierro.

== See also ==
- List of animal and plant symbols of the Canary Islands
