= Cypress Island =

Island in Washington, United States

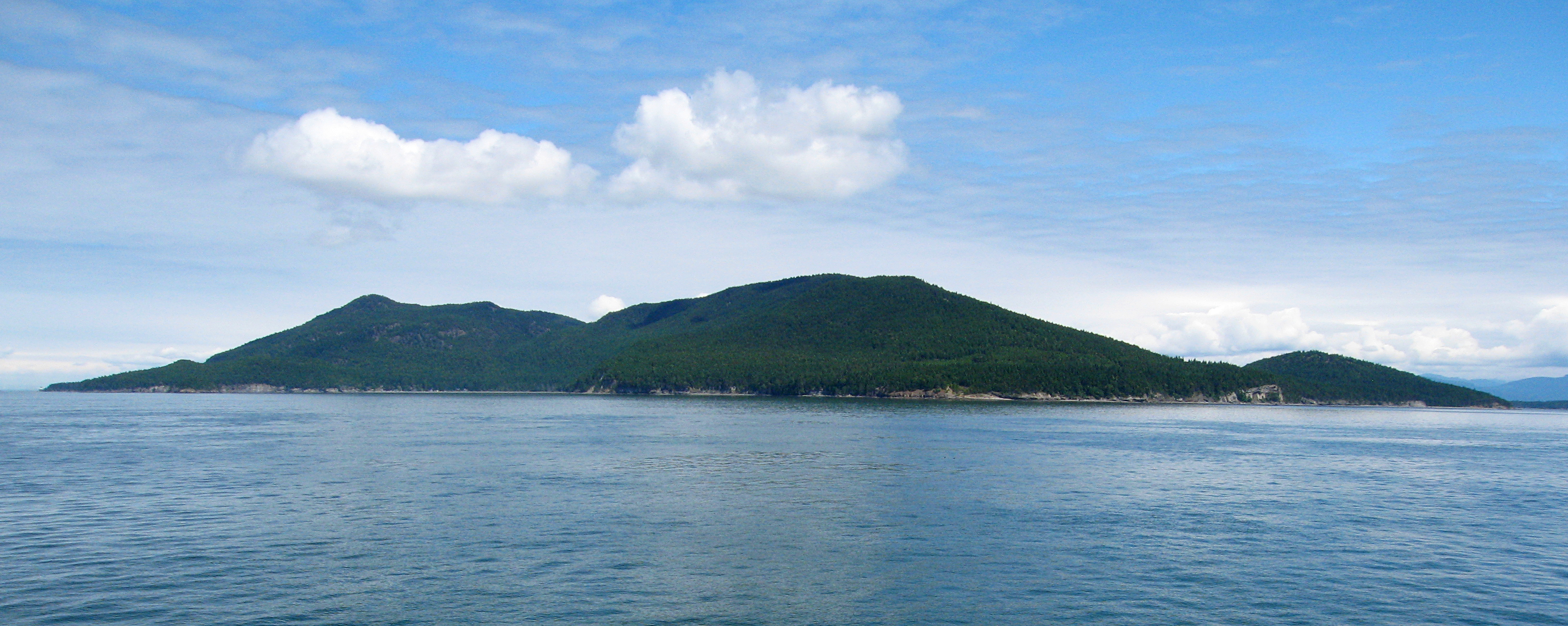
- Cypress Island from Rosario Strait

- Cypress Island in the San Juan Islands

Geography
- Location: Salish Sea
- Coordinates: 48°34′27″N 122°42′20″W
- Area: 8.6 sq mi (22 km^{2})
- Length: 4.75 mi (7.64 km)
- Width: 3.5 mi (5.6 km)
- Highest elevation: 1,525 ft (464.8 m)

Administration
- United States
- State: Washington
- County: Skagit County

Demographics
- Population: 40 (2000)

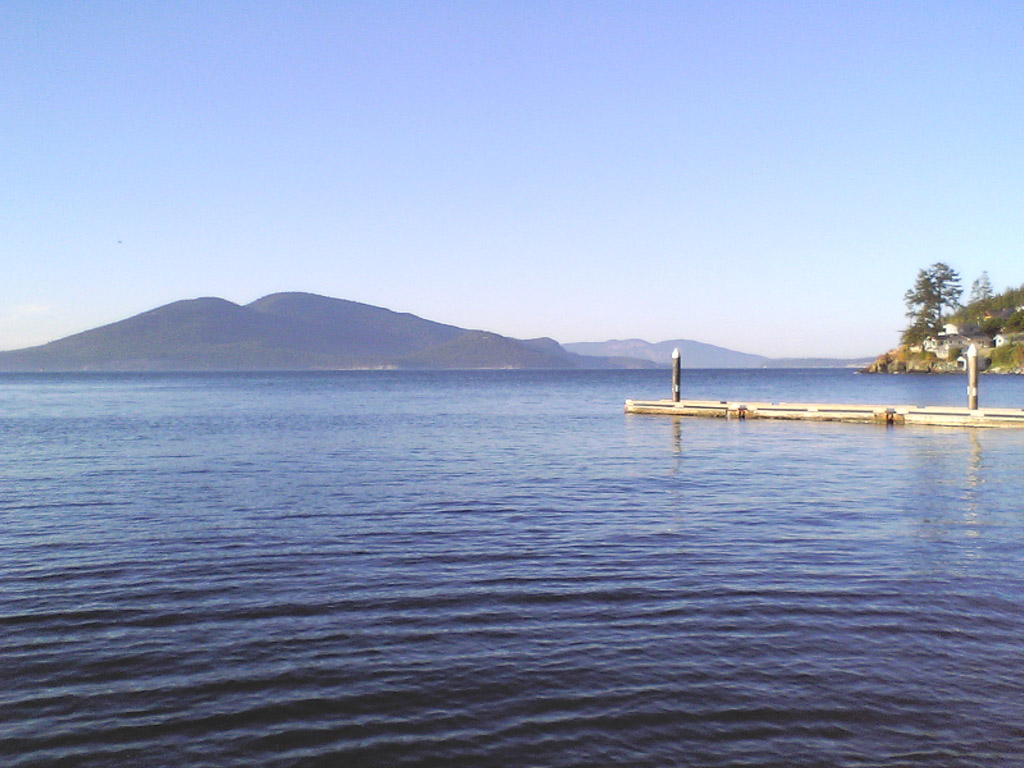
Cypress Island from Anacortes, WA

Map of Cypress Island

Cypress Island is the westernmost part of Skagit County, Washington, and is about halfway between the mainland and offshore San Juan County. It is separated from Blakely Island to the west by Rosario Strait and from Guemes Island to the east by Bellingham Channel. The island has a land area of 5,500 acres (22 km^{2}), and a population of 40 people as of the 2000 United States census.

The Washington Department of Natural Resources manages about 5,100 acres (21 km^{2}) of the island and leaves the island in a natural state. Cypress is heavily forested and has a system of trails linking various parts of the island. In roughly the middle of the island is a lake of about 7 acres (28,000 m^{2}). On the southeastern corner of the island is a sheltered bay featuring a salmon fish farm. Cypress is not served by public ferry and there are no public utilities on the island.

The island is a popular destination for kayak trips due its relatively close proximity to the mainland and to the camping available at two sites on the east side.

Sheltered anchorages for boaters can be found in Eagle Harbor with public state park facilities.

== Natural features ==
Most of the island is underlain by ultramafic rock such as serpentinite, which provides a poor balance of nutrients to soils that develop on it, although dustings of non-ultramafic material such as volcanic ash and loess (both of which are evident over most of the Skagit County soil survey area) may improve the nutrient status somewhat. The island's dominant soil series is Guemes very stony loam. Limited areas of fertile non-ultramafic soils occur around the island's northern end and in small pockets elsewhere. Most of these are mapped as Catla gravelly ashy sandy loam.

Forests on the island are dominated by Douglas fir. The magnesium-rich bedrock supports a considerable population of seaside juniper. Other common trees include shore pine, Pacific madrone and Douglas maple. Some western hemlock, western red cedar, grand fir, red alder and bigleaf maple also occur.

== History ==
=== Native presence ===
Prior to homesteading in the early twentieth century, the island was used by the Samish tribe, which had a winter village established on nearby Guemes Island. Samish fishing villages were present on Cypress until 1900.

=== Early exploration ===
The first sighting of Cypress Island by Europeans was by the Spanish during the 1791 voyage of José María Narváez, who named it San Vincente. The island was named again by Captain George Vancouver in early June 1792, when he mistook juniper trees for cypress trees. Vancouver reports that the Chatham, one of the vessels in his party, lost an anchor in Strawberry Bay, on the west side of the island. Vancouver wrote:

The island of Cypress is principally composed of high rocky mountains and steep perpendicular cliffs which in the center of Strawberry bay fall a little back and the space between the foot of the mountains and the sea side is occupied by low marshy land through which are several small runs of most excellent water that find their way into the bay by oozing through the beach.

=== Preservation ===
In 1975, the Washington Department of Natural Resources (DNR) designated 156 acres (0.63 km^{2}) as a Natural Area Preserve, and added 56 more acres in 1978. At that time, however, most of the island remained in private hands.

Several attempts were made to develop the island. Spokane industrialist Raymond A. Hanson acquired 3,150 acres (12.7 km^{2}) on Cypress Island in 1978 and, in the 1980s proposed first a large-scale public utility development and then a five-star resort and golf-course. Small land-owners on the island, organized in a group called "Friends of Cypress Island" fought both proposals. Hanson finally sold his land to the Department of Natural Resources in 1989.

This purchase along with subsequent, smaller purchases, have allowed the Natural Area Preserve to be expanded to 1,073 acres (4.34 km^{2}), out of the 5,100 acres (21 km^{2}) that comprise the Cypress Island Natural Resources Conservation Area.

The waters surrounding the island became a DNR Aquatic Reserve in 2007.

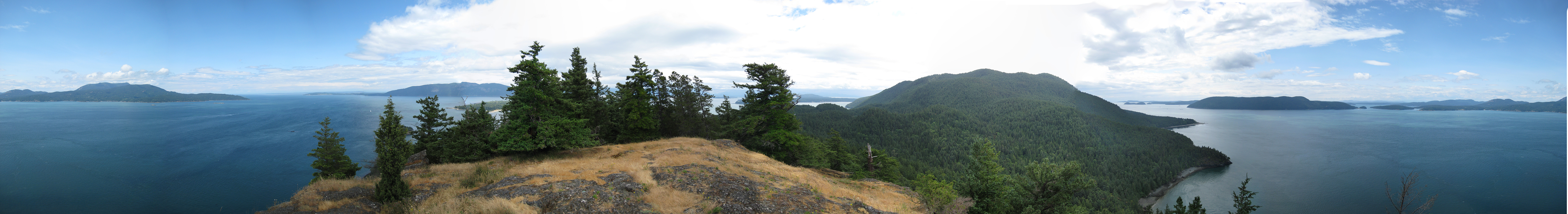
Panorama of the San Juan Islands from Eagle Cliff on Cypress Island
