= BRJ =

BRJ may refer to:

- Blue Rug Juniper (Juniperus horizontalis "Wiltonii"), a creeping, low-growing evergreen with dense, steely-blue foliage
- Bombardier CSeries
- Bourj FC, a Lebanese association football club
- Bureau de renseignements judiciaires
