= Swamp cedar =

Swamp cedar may refer to:

- Juniperus scopulorum (Rocky Mountain juniper)
- Chamaecyparis thyoides (Atlantic white cedar, Atlantic white cypress, southern white cedar, whitecedar, or false-cypress)
- Thuja occidentalis (northern white-cedar, eastern white-cedar, or arborvitae)
