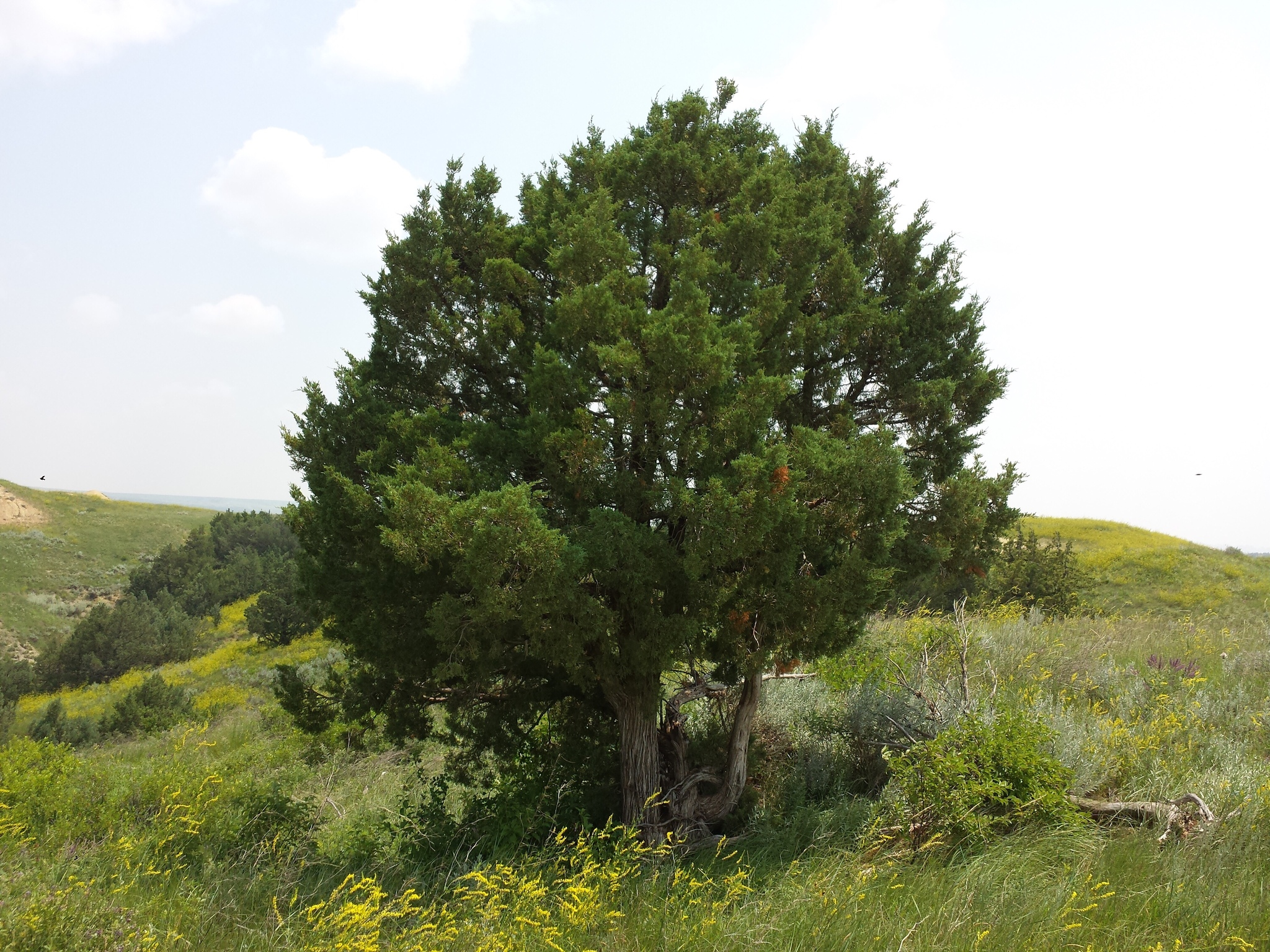
- Juniperus scopulorum in Badlands National Park, South Dakota

Conservation status
- Least Concern (IUCN 3.1)

- Secure (NatureServe)

Scientific classification
- Kingdom: Plantae
- Clade: Tracheophytes
- Clade: Gymnosperms
- Division: Pinophyta
- Class: Pinopsida
- Order: Cupressales
- Family: Cupressaceae
- Genus: Juniperus
- Species: J. scopulorum

Binomial name
- Juniperus scopulorum Sarg.
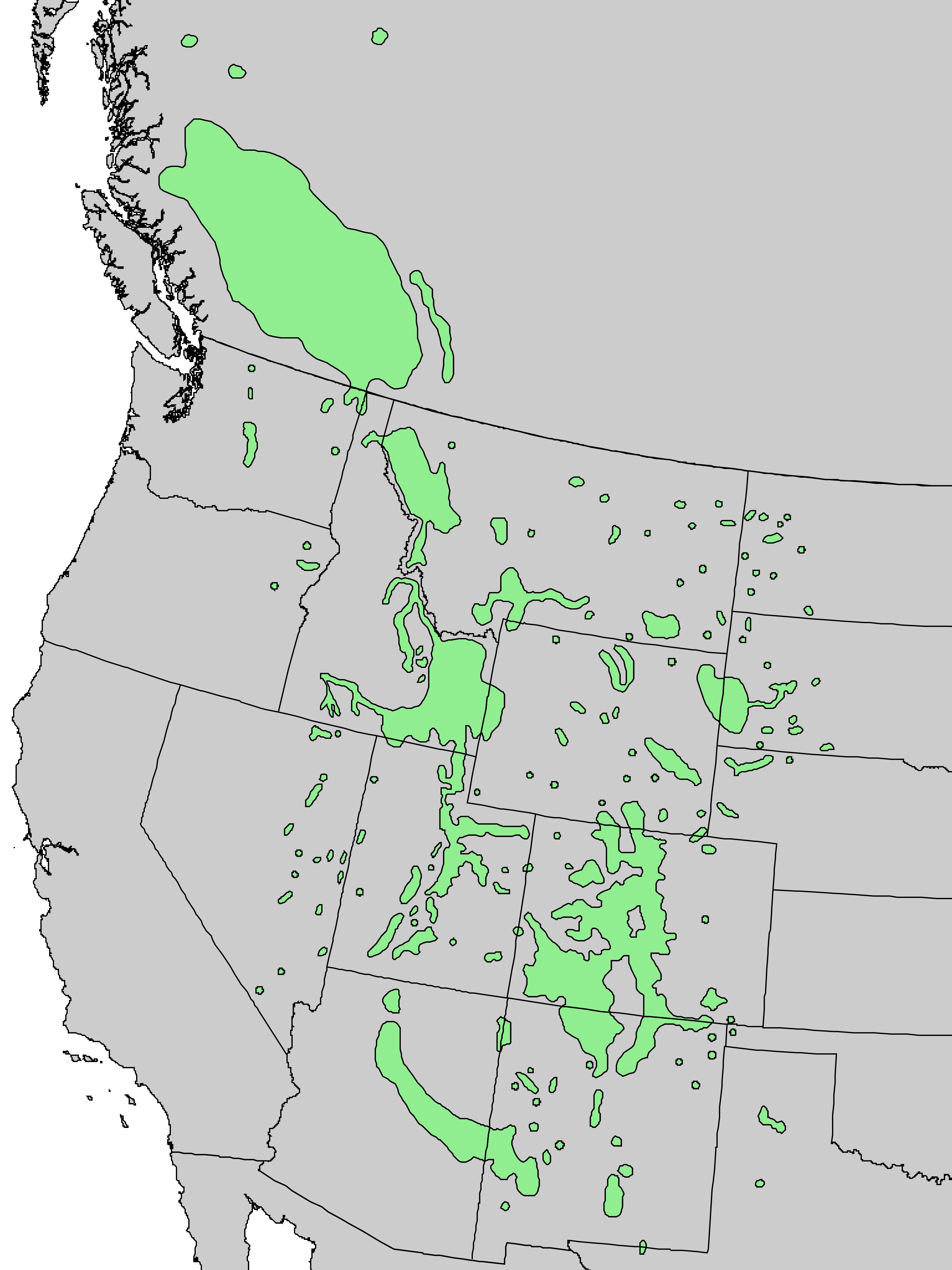
- Natural range of Juniperus scopulorum

Synonyms
- List: Juniperus excelsa Pursh; Juniperus maritima R.P.Adams; Juniperus occidentalis var. pleiosperma Engelm.; Juniperus virginiana var. montana Vasey; Juniperus virginiana var. scopulorum (Sarg.) Lemmon; Juniperus virginiana subsp. scopulorum (Sarg.) A.E.Murray; Sabina maritima (R.P.Adams) Y.Yang & K.S.Mao; Sabina scopulorum (Sarg.) Rydb.

= Juniperus scopulorum =

Western North American species of juniper

Juniperus scopulorum, the Rocky Mountain juniper, is a species of juniper native to western North America, from southwest Canada to the Great Plains of the United States and small areas of northern Mexico. They are the most widespread of all the New World junipers. They are relatively small trees, occasionally just a large bush or stunted snag. They tend to be found in isolated groves or even as single trees rather than as the dominant tree of a forest. Though they can survive fires, they are vulnerable to them especially when young and this is one of the factors that can limit their spread into grasslands.

Rocky Mountain junipers provide habitat and food for wildlife. They provide cover to a range of species, from small birds and mammals to deer and bighorn sheep. Their berry-like cones are eaten by many animals and their scaly leaves and small twigs are browsed in small amounts by large herbivores. The primary human use is in landscaping for aesthetic purposes, to shelter habitations, or attract fruit-eating birds. They are also used in small amounts for their insect repellent and rot-resistant wood or as firewood for heating.

== Description ==
Juniperus scopulorum is a small evergreen tree that in favorable conditions may reach as much as 20 metres (66 feet) in height. However, on sites with little water or intense sun it will only attain shrub height, and even those that reach tree size will more typically be 4.6–6.1 metres (15–20 feet) tall in open juniper woodlands. Younger trees have a narrow pyramidal shape, but develop into a rounded, oval, or spreading and irregular crown when older. They may either have a single trunk or multiple stems. Trunks can be large on mature trees, 38–76 centimetres (15–30 inches) in diameter. When the subsoil is difficult to penetrate and lacks moisture the roots of Juniperus scopulorum spread out. They are numerous and fibrous in the upper part of the soil. When soils are deep and well drained they will grow to a greater depth.

On twigs between 5 and 10 millimetres (3/16 and 13/32 in) in diameter the bark is smooth. On larger twigs and branches it becomes rough, coming off in thin strips. Juniperus scopulorum has red-brown bark on branches that can weather to grey on the trunk. The texture of the bark is rough and comes away in shreds on the trunk with brown bark showing in the cracks at times. Branches tend to grow outwards a short distance and then curve to growing upwards (ascending). In sheltered to somewhat shady locations the branches may hang downwards and be quite slender. The very ends, the branchlets, can either stand upright or hang down.

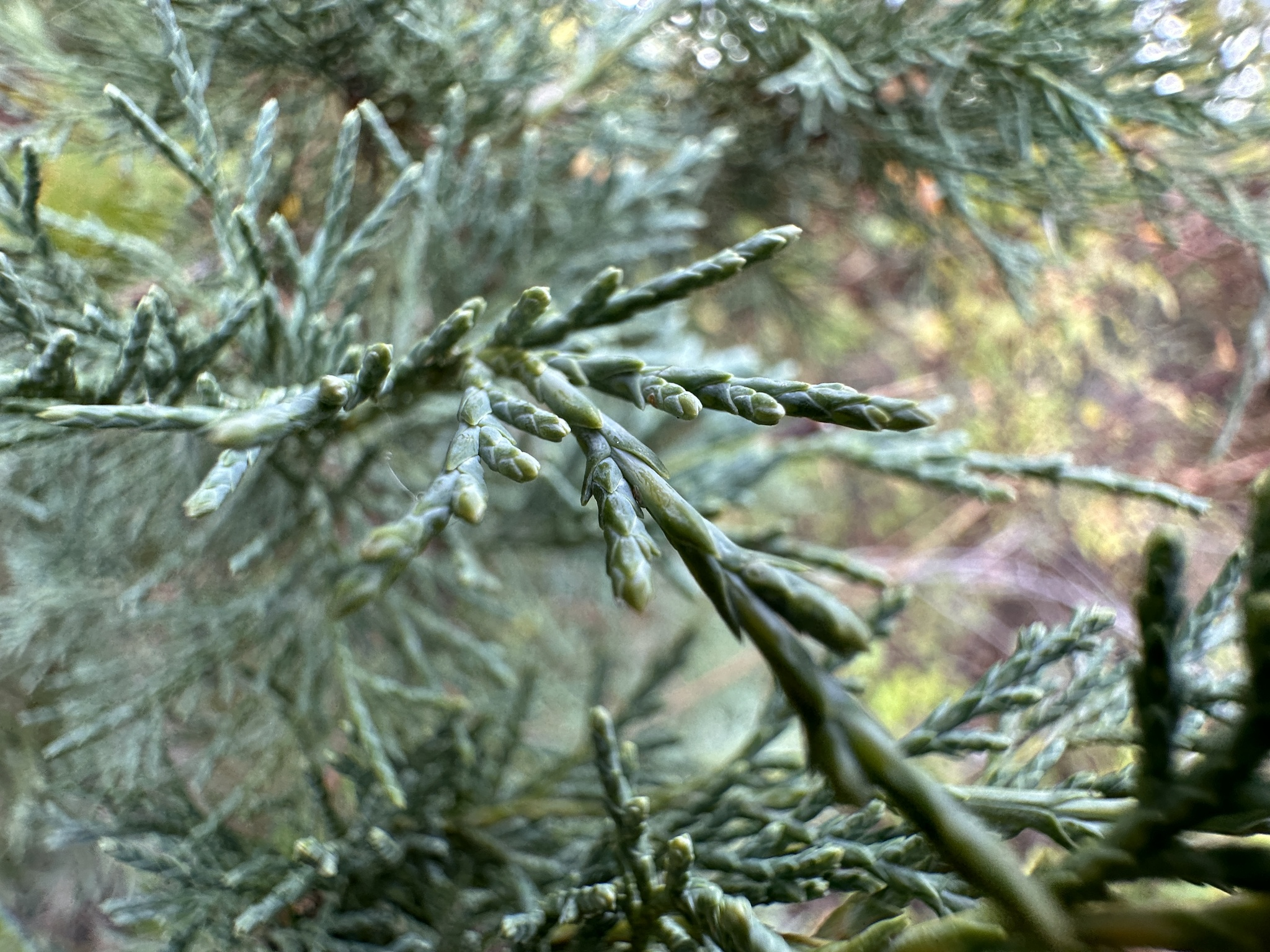
Juniperus scopulorum foliage

Young shoots are very slender. All the leaves are light to dark green, but are often covered in a waxy coating that gives a blue or white cast to the leaves (glaucous) making them appear blue-gray or blue. On immature trees they will be covered in sharp needle like "whip leaves" 3–6 millimetres (1/8–1/4 in) long that stick out from the shoots. The needles will not have the waxy coating on their upper surface. What appear to be green scales on the shoots of adult trees are the mature leaves which clasp the shoot in opposite pairs with the next pair down or up the shoot rotated a quarter turn (90°) around it (decussate). Occasionally they will be turned one third to make the shoot three sided. The scales either do not overlap or overlap for at most one-fifth of their length of 1–3 millimetres (1/32–1/8 in).

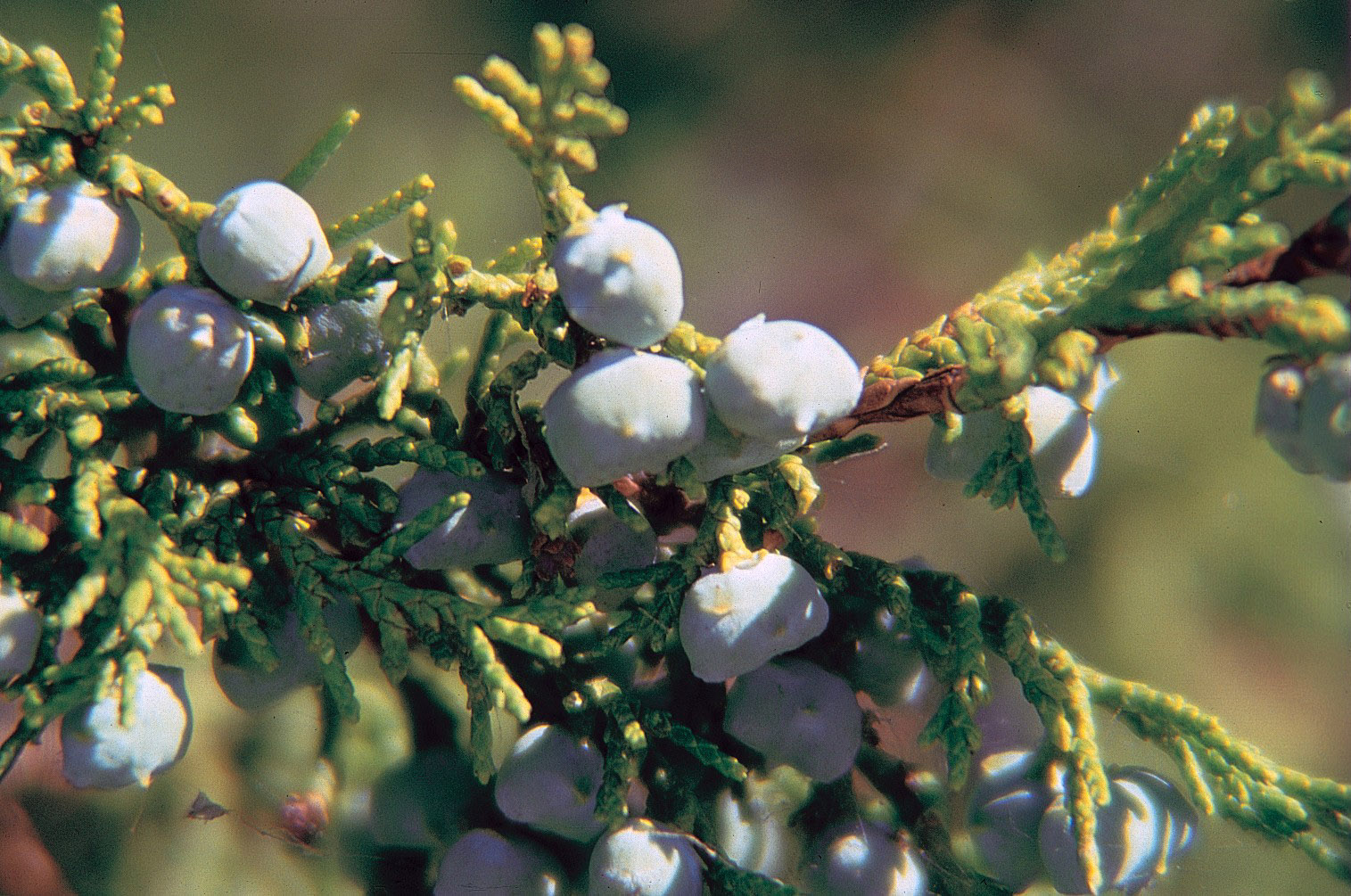
Foliage and cones

The seed cones are berry-like that are round to somewhat irregular in shape with two lobes (globose to bilobed) and 5–9 mm (3/16–11/32 in) in diameter. They are dark blue-black in color, but will be pale blue-white when covered in natural wax. The berries most often contain two seeds, but may contain one or three; they are mature in about 18 months. The pollen cones are 2–4 mm (3/32–5/32 in) long, and shed their pollen in early spring, generally in April. It is usually dioecious, producing cones of only one sex on each tree, but is occasionally monoecious.

=== Chemistry ===
Rocky Mountain juniper is an aromatic plant. Essential oil extracted from the trunk is prominent in cis-thujopsene, α-pinene, cedrol, allo-aromadendrene epoxide, (E)-caryophyllene, and widdrol. Limb essential oil is primarily α-pinene and leaf essential oil is primarily sabinene. Experiments with deer have found that oxygenated monoterpenes, like sabinene, inhibit the gut bacteria of ruminants and deer show the expected preference for foliage lower in these chemicals.

=== Similar species ===
Juniperus scopulorum is closely related to eastern redcedar (Juniperus virginiana), and often hybridizes with it where their ranges meet on the Great Plains. It will also form hybrids with alligator juniper (Juniperus deppeana), creeping juniper (Juniperus horizontalis), oneseed juniper (Juniperus monosperma), and Utah juniper (Juniperus osteosperma). The population of juniper trees in Mexico near the former site of Colonia Pacheco, Chihuahua is a hybrid with Juniperus blancoi. There is some disagreement whether hybrids are formed with the oneseed juniper in the wild.

== Taxonomy ==
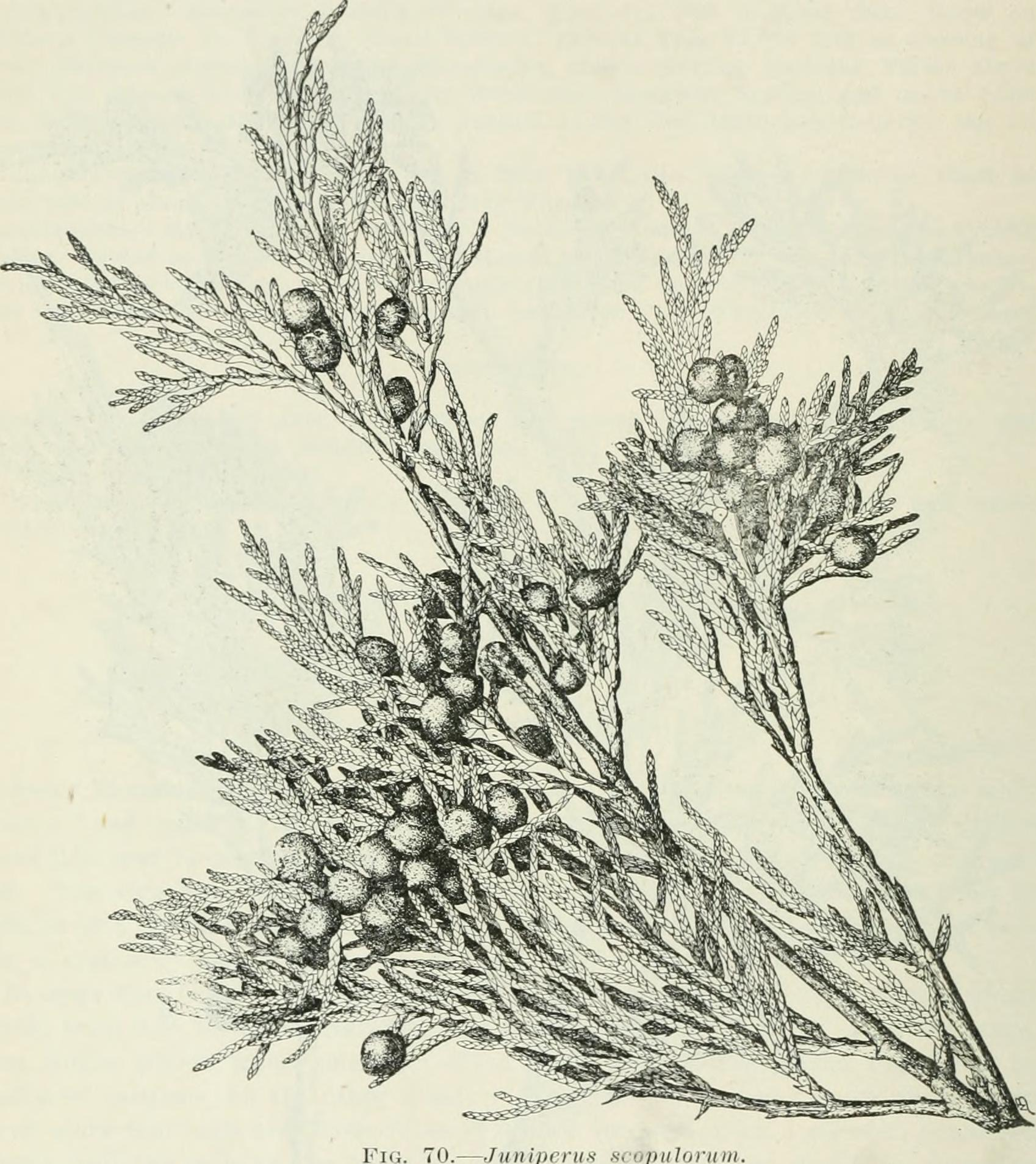
Illustration of Juniperus scopulorum, 1908

Juniperus scopulorum was first described and named as a separate species by Charles Sprague Sargent in 1897. Previously trees had been identified as one of its two close relatives, Juniperus virginiana or Juniperus occidentalis. Parts of the species were described as Juniperus virginiana var. montana by George Vasey in 1876 and as Juniperus occidentalis var. pleiosperma by George Engelmann in 1877. Its proper classification has continued to be debated by botanists with Per Axel Rydberg proposing to move it to his new genus as Sabina scopulorum in 1900 and Albert Edward Murray publishing a paper in 1983 that reclassified it as a subspecies under the name Juniperus virginiana subsp. scopulorum.

Isolated populations of junipers occur close to sea level in the Puget Sound area in Washington Park near Anacortes and southwestern British Columbia in a park called Smugglers Cove. In both locales, there are a considerable number of young and old specimens. A 2007 paper showed that they are genetically distinct, and proposed that it be recognized as a new species Juniperus maritima. If valid, it is a cryptic species barely distinguishable on morphology, though it does differ in phenology, with the cones maturing in 14–16 months, and often has the tips of the seeds exposed at the cone apex. However, as of 2024 it is listed as a synonym by both Plants of the World Online (POWO) and World Flora Online (WFO).

As of 2024 Juniperus scopulorum is listed as an accepted species with no subspecies by POWO, WFO, and World Plants.

=== Names ===
The genus name Juniperus is classical Latin, rather than botanical Latin, and was the name used in antiquity for this type of tree. The species name (specific epithet), scopulorum, derives from Latin with the meaning "of rocky cliffs", a reference to its frequent occurrence in rocky areas. The most common of its English names, "Rocky Mountain juniper", was at first applied to Juniperus occidentalis in 1841. Because J. scopulorum was at first largely considered the same at the Eastern red cedar, no unique common name was required for it and when it was recognized as a species it was most often called "Rocky Mountain red cedar", a common name now applied to Thuja plicata. Other common names used in the United States include "river juniper", "mountain red cedar", "Colorado red cedar", "weeping juniper", and "Rocky Mountain redcedar". In one unusual locality in Spring Valley, Nevada they are known as "swamp cedar" for growing in a relatively wet canyon bottom. In Canada it is also known as the "western red-cedar" and similar variations in English and "genévrier des Montagnes Rocheuses" (literally juniper of the Rocky Mountains) and genévrier des montagnes du Colorado (juniper of the mountains of Colorado) in French. In casual conversation the trees will usually simply be called "cedars" or "junipers" without qualification by residents of the western United States.

== Distribution and habitat ==
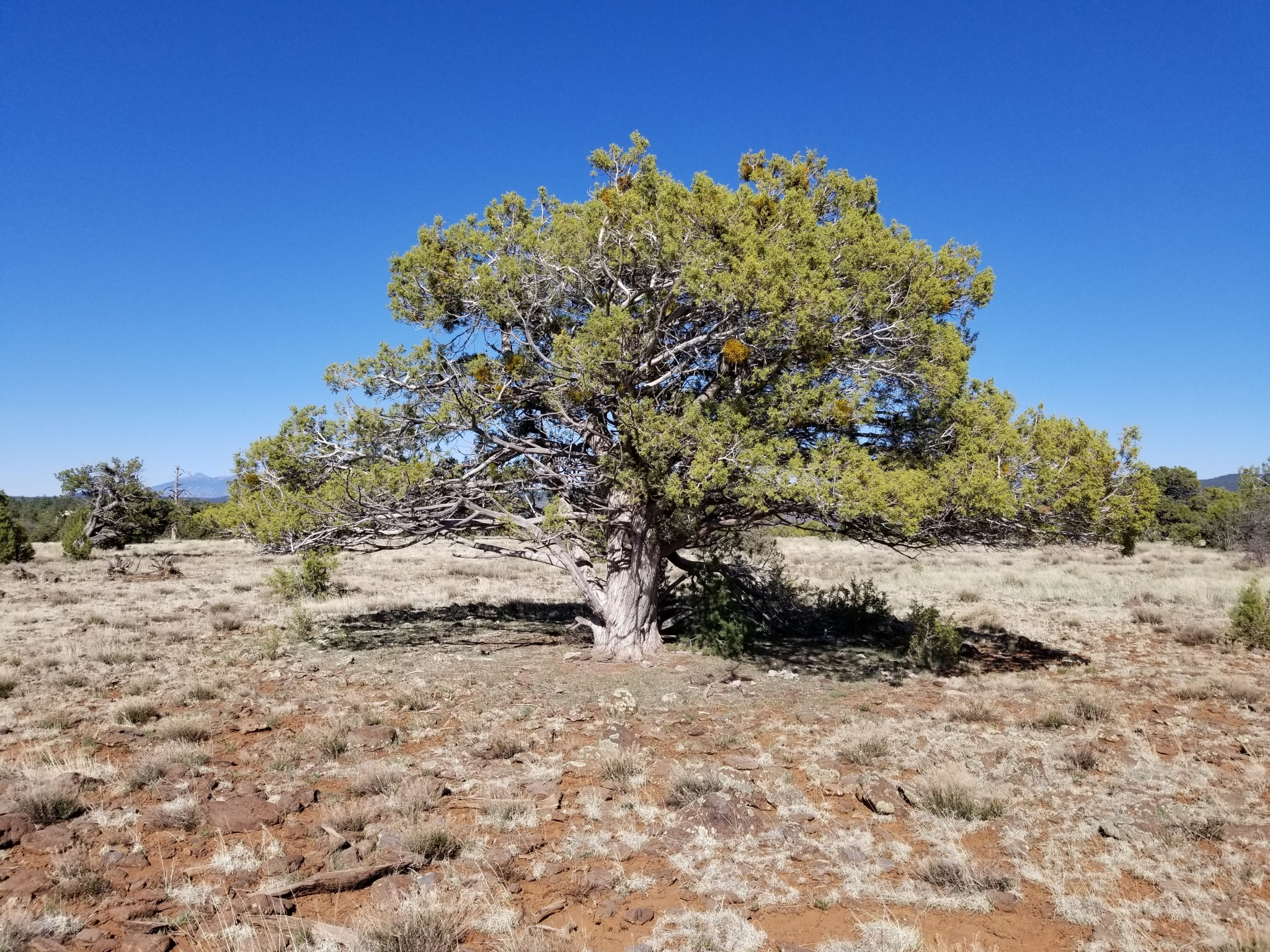
Large Juniperus scopulorum tree in open piñon-juniper woodland, Coconino County, Arizona

Rocky Mountain junipers are found across a wider range than any other new world juniper species, though it is almost nowhere a common species. More often they are scattered widely across the landscape in isolated groups, grove, or stands. The species is native to western North America, in Canada in south British Columbia and southwest Alberta, in the United States sporadically from Washington east to North Dakota, south to Arizona and also locally western Texas, and northernmost Mexico from Sonora east to Coahuila. It grows at elevations of 500–2,700 m (1,600–8,900 ft) on dry soils, often together with other juniper species. It requires at least 25 centimetres (10 in) of annual precipitation, though the average for its range is 38–46 centimetres (15–18 in) and it survives on Vancouver Island with as much as 66 centimetres (26 in) of precipitation. Though it grows in very dry environments in western North America and has great drought endurance, it is not as adapted to dry conditions as other western juniper species.

The trees are very numerous in the lower mountains and foothills where grasslands or scrublands transition to low forests. In the Southern Rocky Mountains, the Colorado Plateau, and parts of Nevada Juniperus scopulorum is associated with the various species of piñon pine as a key species of the piñon-juniper woodland. At edges and lower elevations the junipers are more numerous with a gradual transition to all piñons at higher elevations. It is also a minor part of forests above this such as ponderosa pine forests (Pinus ponderosa) and areas dominated by Gamble oak (Quercus gambelii). Starting in northern Colorado and northern Utah the Rocky Mountain Juniper dominates a woodland type named for the species and found through Idaho and Montana into southern Canada.

Though tolerant of a wide range of soil conditions, Juniperus scopulorum strongly prefers soils that are alkaline and high in calcium. They grow to their maximum size on deep, moist, but well draining soils with plenty of organic matter. More often they are found on poor, dry soils especially ones formed from basalt, limestone, sandstone, lavas, and shale. They are also tolerant of soils with a significant amount of clay or that have a subsoil that is naturally cemented together like hardpan. Though obtaining a greater size in more sheltered locations they will successfully grow on rock outcrops with no soil and on high ridges. In the mountains to the north of Colorado and Utah the trees grow on relatively dry sites, often south facing slopes. In the south it grows in more sheltered locations and canyons, with the transition occurring in Colorado.

In one instance it has adapted to quite extreme conditions for a juniper, growing on wet clay soils in Spring Valley, Nevada. There it grows in the valley bottom as an almost riparian species and also survives moderately salty water. A similar pattern is also found in the farthest south populations of the species found in Mexico. There it largely grows near streams in canyons.

=== Pleistocene distribution ===
Towards the end of the Last Glacial Period, from 13,500 to 10,000 years before the present, Rocky Mountain juniper grew at much lower elevations in what is now the great basin and desert Southwest. Evidence from pack rat middens show that plant vegetation zones were 300 to 1100 meters lower in elevation than they are at present. In the Southern Rockies in what is now Colorado and Wyoming juniper woodlands were about 600 meters lower than in the modern Holocene epoch. The relic groves still found on the Great Plains and the Laramie Basin in Wyoming are likely remnants of this older distribution. During the ice age the north of its present range was largely covered in glaciers and far too cold for it in areas not covered in ice with populations only reaching as far north as present day south-eastern Wyoming, southeastern Oregon, southern Idaho, and northern Colorado insolated refuges.

== Ecology and conservation ==
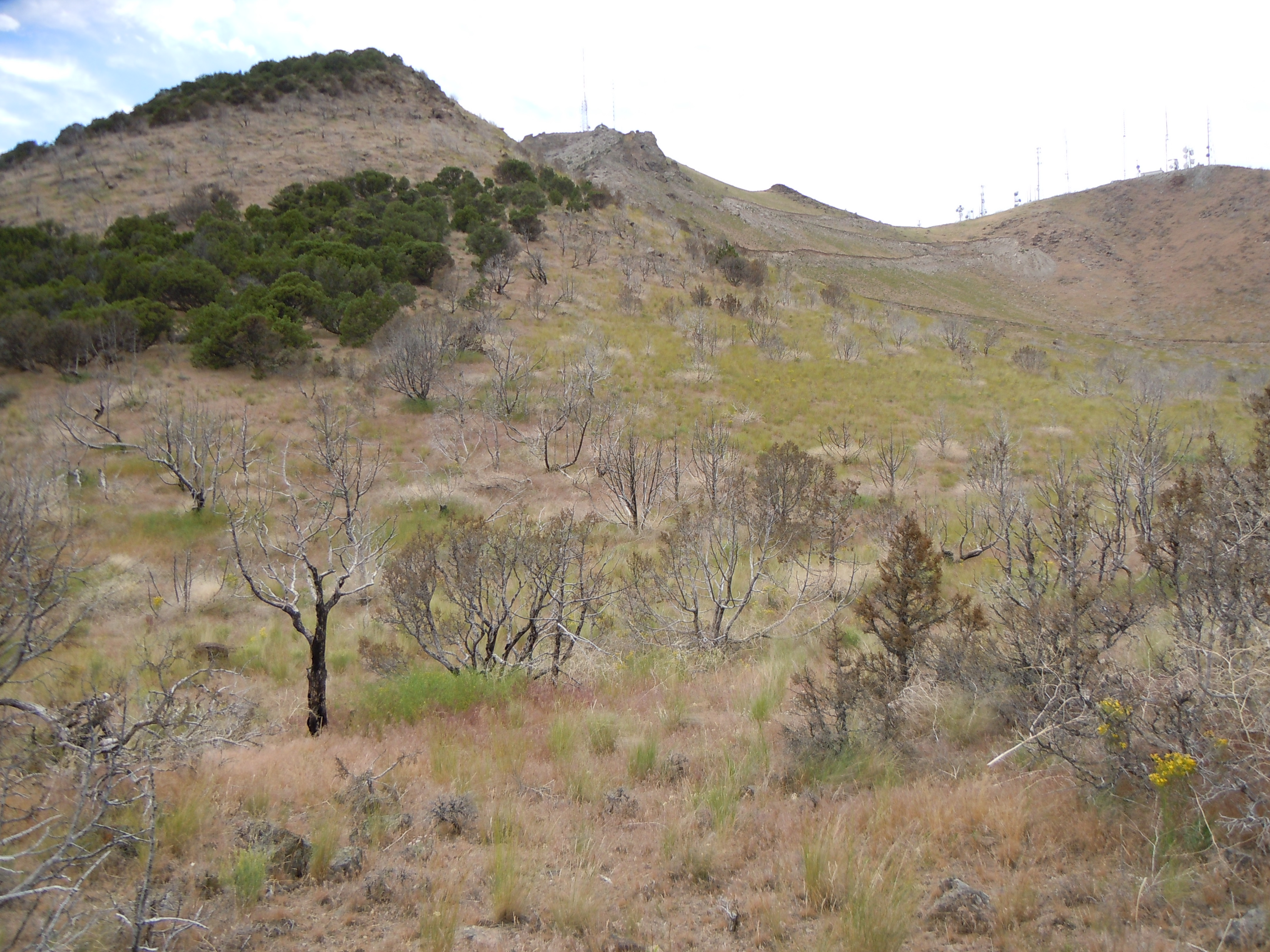
Area in eastern Idaho showing fire killed Rocky Mountain juniper and surviving stand in 2010.

At lower elevations, in the absence of fire, Juniperus scopulorum may be considered a climax species, one that comes late in the succession of plant species, and perhaps more adapted to stable environments. At higher elevations of the Intermountain West dominated by Douglas fir (Pseudotsuga menziesii), it may be considered more of a pioneer species. Rocky Mountain juniper is a relatively slow growing species with an average age (at one site) of eight years for saplings 30 centimeters in height. As a species they have difficulty becoming established on constantly dry sites and have greater success establishing in areas that catch temporary water, such as rocky crevices and slight depressions.

Until they are approximately 50 years old Rocky Mountain junipers are vulnerable to fire due to thin bark and relatively large concentrations of resins and oils. Trees that are burned have no ability to regenerate from the roots. Older trees are still vulnerable to fires, but may survive if they lack lower branches for a ground fire to climb into the crown of the tree. Because of this, fire is sometimes used as a method to control junipers in rangeland, but if there is not enough fuel on the ground the fire is less effective in killing trees targeted for removal. Most older trees show signs of having survived four to six fires in their lifetimes. Historically fire was one of the factors that maintained open, grassy plains and prevented the invasion of trees like Rocky Mountain juniper. With frequent fires they are restricted to rocky areas that have little to no fuel load to ignite the trees. Prior to European-American settlement of the west, fires typically reoccurred at intervals of 50–100 years in most forests including piñon-juniper woodlands.

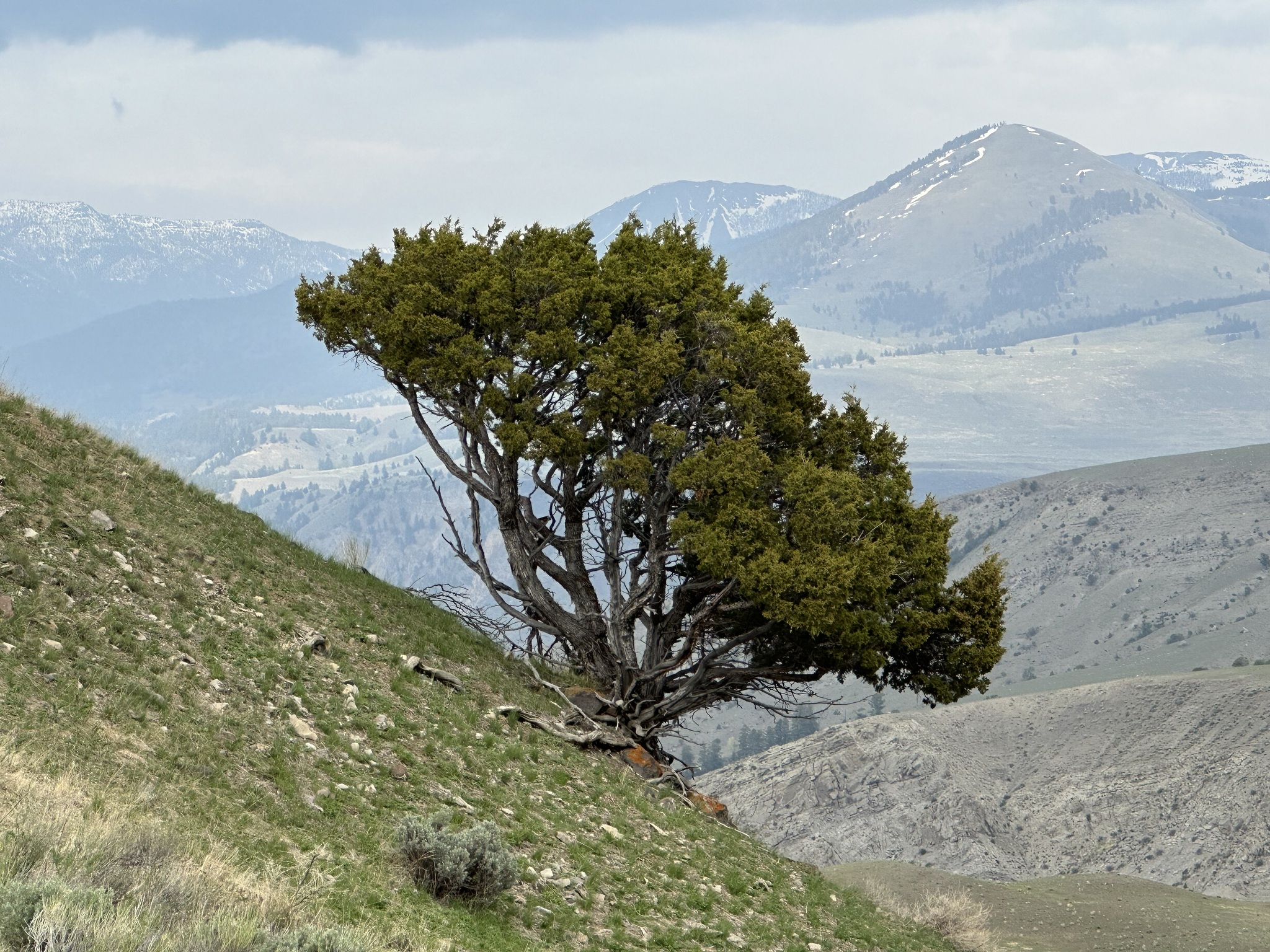
Juniperus scopulorum on hillside in Yellowstone National Park, Montana showing distinct browse-line

The foliage of Juniperus scopulorum is heavily browsed by mule deer, particularly in the winter. Studies of their winter foraging habits show that together with big sagebrush (Artemisia tridentata) and bitterbrush (Purshia spp.) it may make up two-thirds of their diet in winter. However, when given a choice, mule deer prefer alligator juniper (Juniperus deppeana), with its lower content of volatile oils to that of Rocky Mountain juniper. The presence of cover in the form of small trees and large bushes, like Rocky Mountain Juniper, is also important to mule deer. When the trees are removed from a landscape there is more and higher quality food for them, but their numbers decrease, but when junipers repopulate a range deer numbers increase. Overpopulation of deer are factor in causing junipers to dominate an area.

In areas with many deer eating the young shoots, the trees will have a distinctive "browse-line" with bare limbs and trunk. Deer also show strong preferences for the foliage of certain "ice-cream trees" with deer making much more of an effort to browse upon them. The reason for this preference is unknown, but captive deer will show the same preference when offered branches trimmed from trees in more controlled experiments.

Two species of mites are known to use Rocky Mountain juniper leaf-scales as a food source, Oligonychus ununguis and Eurytetranychus admes. Usually they are a minor pest, but occasionally their numbers can explode and cause serious damage to trees.

The iridescent olive-green juniper hairstreak butterfly eats the leaves of this and other juniper species as a caterpillar. As adults, the males are usually found on or around juniper trees waiting for females. They have two flights per year and overwinter as pupae in the soil.

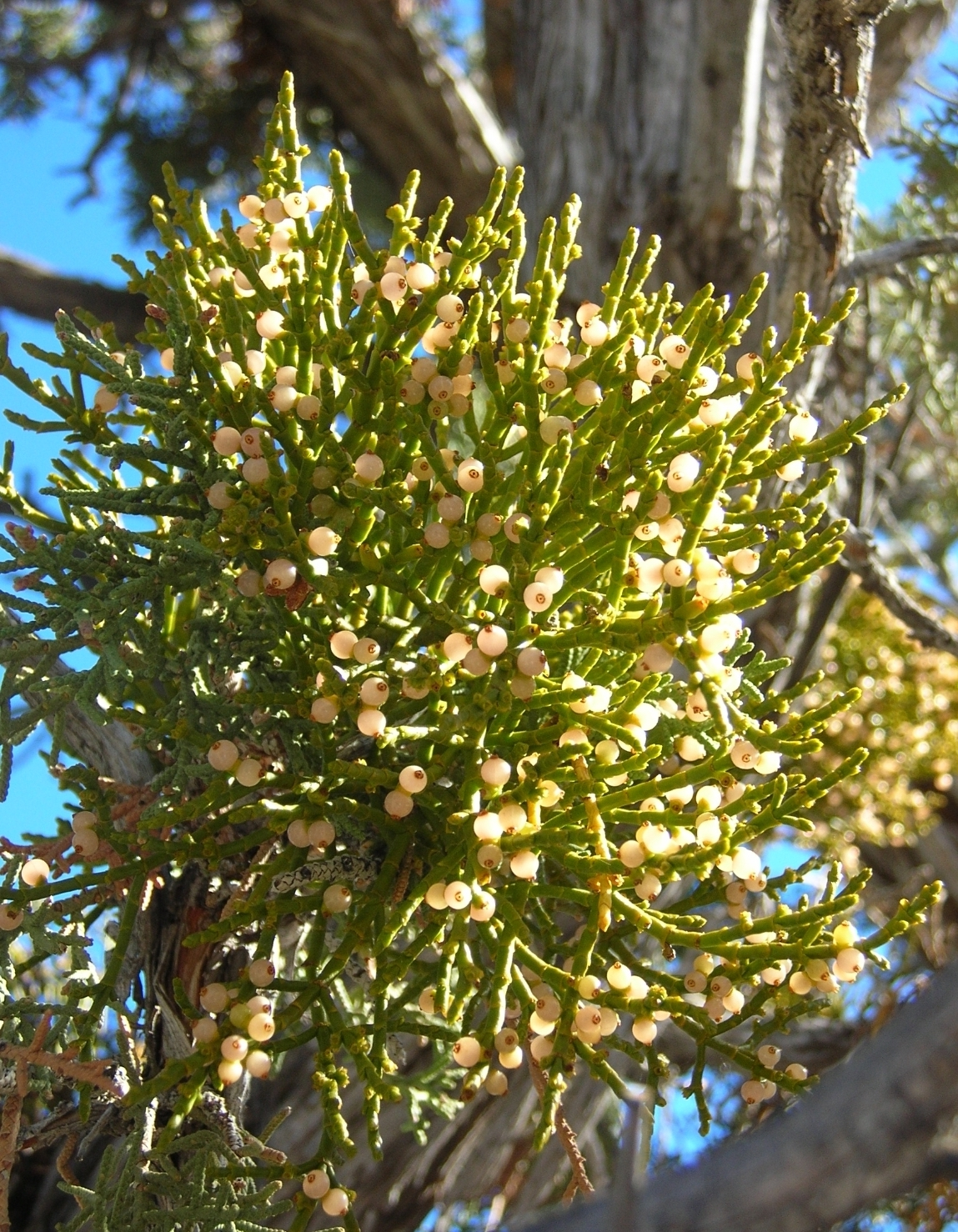
Example of juniper mistletoe with fruit

The parasitic plant juniper mistletoe (Phoradendron juniperinum) will use Rocky Mountain juniper as a host, along with other juniper species. Though harmful to the trees it is not as dangerous as the dwarf mistletoes which attack other conifer species. Once infected with juniper mistletoe it is very difficult or impossible to remove the parasite from the host. The mistletoe berries provide food for fruit eating birds in the winter.

In Montana a study of pine-juniper woodlands with Rocky Mountain junipers found that mourning doves will make use of them as a nesting site, though they prefer limber pines. A different study of piñon-juniper woodlands found that mourning doves prefer junipers as nesting locations. Another bird which makes use of them as a nesting location is the chipping sparrow. On the northern plains Rocky Mountain juniper stands support a wide variety of bird species, directly or indirectly. The American robin is one of the most frequently observed species in stands. Other birds observed year round in the groves include black-capped chickadees, black-billed magpies, and long-eared owls. The appropriately named juniper titmouse also makes use of J. sopulorum groves when available, though it does not favor one species of juniper in particular. Many songbirds enthusiastically eat the soft, slightly sweet cones including American robins, solitaires, and waxwings. The fruits are highly attractive to Townsend's solitaire, the mockingbird, pine grosbeak, and evening grosbeak. The Bohemian waxwing is especially noted for consuming large amounts of the berries. In a controlled experiment by Dr. Edgar Alexander Mearns a caged bird consumed 900 of them in five hours. Larger animals also consume the cones including black bears, bighorn sheep, and mule deer.

The seeds of Rocky Mountain juniper are initially reluctant to sprout. Due to a combination of chemical inhibitors and a waterproof coating on the seeds they only germinate at high numbers in their second year off the tree.

=== Conservation ===
In 2011 the IUCN evaluated Juniperus scopulorum as least concern as it is a widespread species with an increasing population and no other significant threats. Similarly NatureServe reviewed its status in 2016 and rated it globally secure (G5). They found populations of the species to be imperiled (S2) in Saskatchewan and Oklahoma. They also gave the populations in Alberta and Oregon the status of vulnerable (S3).

== Notable trees ==
One particular individual, the Jardine Juniper in Utah, is thought to be over 1,500 years old, though some erroneous estimates of its age previously attributed 3,000 years to it. The oldest known tree in South Dakota is an unnamed tree north of the town of Custer. Found on a granite outcrop the tree presents a quite windblown and twisted appearance. A single core sample taken from the tree dated its germination to the year 1091 when observed in 1992. A dead trunk found in New Mexico was found to have 1,888 rings; other trees in the same area are suspected to exceed 2,000 years. The more typical longevity of individual trees is from 250 to 300 years of age.

The largest tree of this species is one in Logan Canyon, Cache National Forest, Utah. It was last reliably measured in 2014 as 12.2 metres (40 ft) tall with it limbs spreading over 8.5 metres (28 ft). However, this tree is, as of 2016, reported to no longer be in good health.

== Uses ==
The primary uses of Rocky Mountain juniper are as an ornamental tree in landscaping. It is also used for firewood, as a herb, and for its rot resistant wood.

=== Cultivation ===
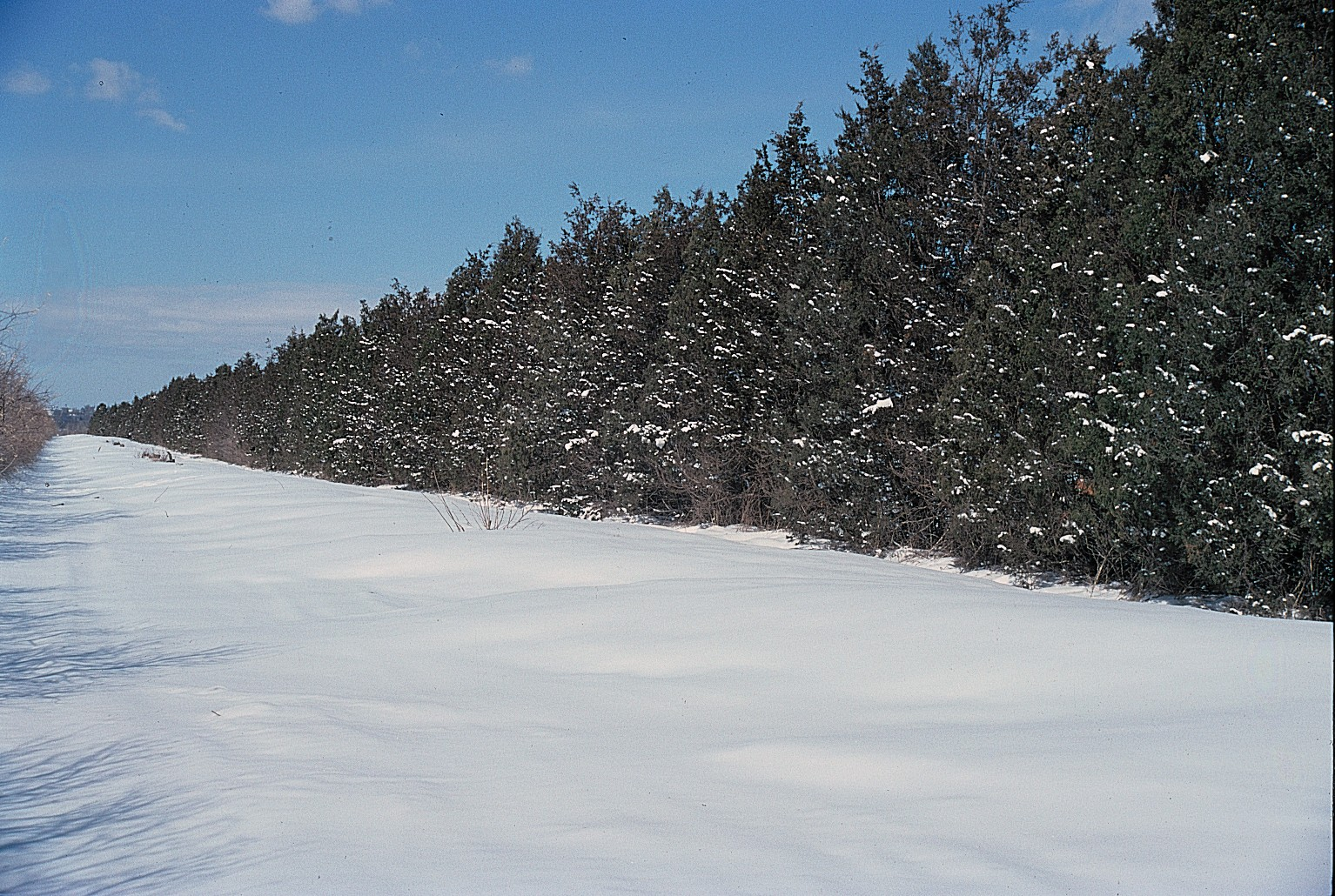
Rocky Mountain junipers in a windbreak in North Dakota

Rocky Mountain juniper is quite frequently used in gardens when a moderate to small-sized tree is needed for a location with medium moisture (mesic) to dry soil and low soil productivity. The tree is sometimes planted as a windbreak in the west and on the plains. It is also moderately popular subject of bonsai cultivation in the United States. There are over 100 named cultivars of the species in the plant trade.

'Blue arrow' is a cultivar with a narrow and erect (fastigiate) growth habit. At full growth it will be 3.6 to 4.5 meters tall and just 60 centimeters wide. It has a blue-gray cast, but is not as blue as the variety usually called 'skyrocket'. It is a recipient of the Royal Horticultural Society's Award of Garden Merit.

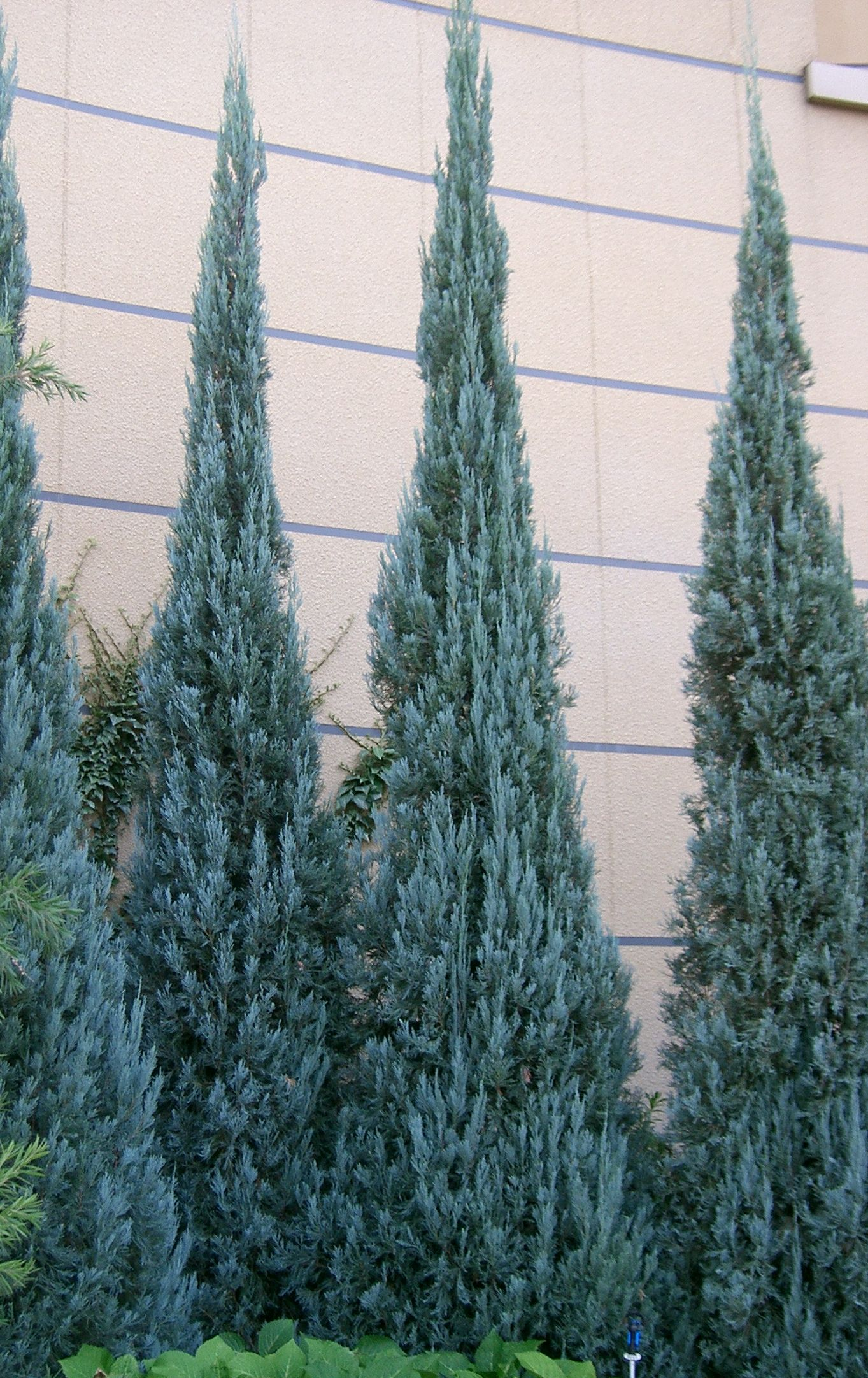
Juniperus scopulorum "Blue Heaven"

'Blue heaven' is another of the many fastigiate type cultivars. It has the typical blue-white cast to its foliage in summer, but it is more green colored in winter months. Size when full grown will be 4–5 meters tall and 90–120 centimeters in width. Like most varieties derived from Rocky Mountain juniper it is intolerant of hot, humid weather and constantly wet conditions and will usually succumb to root rots in muggy climates.

'Skyrocket' is a very frequently mentioned cultivar. It is a very popular ornamental plant in gardens, grown for its very slender, strictly erect growth habit. It is also sometimes listed as Juniperus virginiana 'Skyrocket' due to debate over the classification of the wild individual that is the parent of this cultivar. It was first introduced in 1949 under the name 'Pilaris 1' by Schuel Nursery in South Bend, Indiana. This cultivar is listed by Ohio State University Extension as being resistant, but not immune, to cedar-apple rust.

The cultivar 'Wichita Blue' is an all-male selection of the species. It has a conical shape, blue-green foliage, and grows slowly. It has the same winter hardiness as the species.

Like most junipers, Rocky Mountain juniper can be infected by a number funguses. Cedar-apple rust (Gymnosporangium juniperi-virginianae) produces hard stem galls in winter of up to 5 centimeters in width on susceptible junipers. These are not seriously harmful to the juniper host, but in the spring the galls produce soft, gummy horns that release spores to infect apples and related plants in the rose family where it is a much more serious disease. For this reason it is frequently recommended to not plant junipers near desirable apple trees to reduce the spread of the disease. Rocky Mountain junipers are also susceptible to hawthorn rust (Gymnosporangium globosum), quince rust (Gymnosporangium clavipes), and juniper broom rust (Gymnosporangium nidus-avis). Treatment is only to trim out infection to improve the appearance of the tree as the infection is not threatening to the health of junipers. In Europe it is attacked by the juniper webber moth, Dichomeris marginella. The USDA plant hardiness zone range for the species is zone 3 to zone 7.

=== Wood ===
The wood of Rocky Mountain Juniper is quite rot-resistant when cured, and prior to the widespread adoption of the steel fence post they were often harvested to build fences in the American west. The wood is lighter in weight and not as hard as that of the Eastern red cedar. In strength, color, and appearance it is difficult to distinguish the two apart. The outer sapwood is light-colored while the inner heartwood is deep red with occasional streaks of white or purple. Due to the usually small size of their trunks they are not much utilized as timber except for making specialty products like "cedar" linings for closets or chests to repel moths. As a fuel wood it is only of fair quality. It has an excellent smell when burning, but produces poor coals, lots of sparks, and is moderately difficult to split.

=== Traditional uses ===
Some Plateau Indian tribes boiled an infusion from the leaves and inner bark to treat coughs and fevers. The cones were also sometimes boiled into a drink used as a laxative and to treat colds. Among many Native American cultures, the smoke of the burning juniper is used to drive away evil spirits prior to conducting a ceremony, such as a healing ceremony.

A small quantity of ripe berries can be eaten as an emergency food or as a sage-like seasoning for meat. The dried berries can be roasted and ground into a coffee substitute.

== See also ==
- Ecology of the Rocky Mountains
- Jardine Juniper
- Pinyon-juniper woodland
