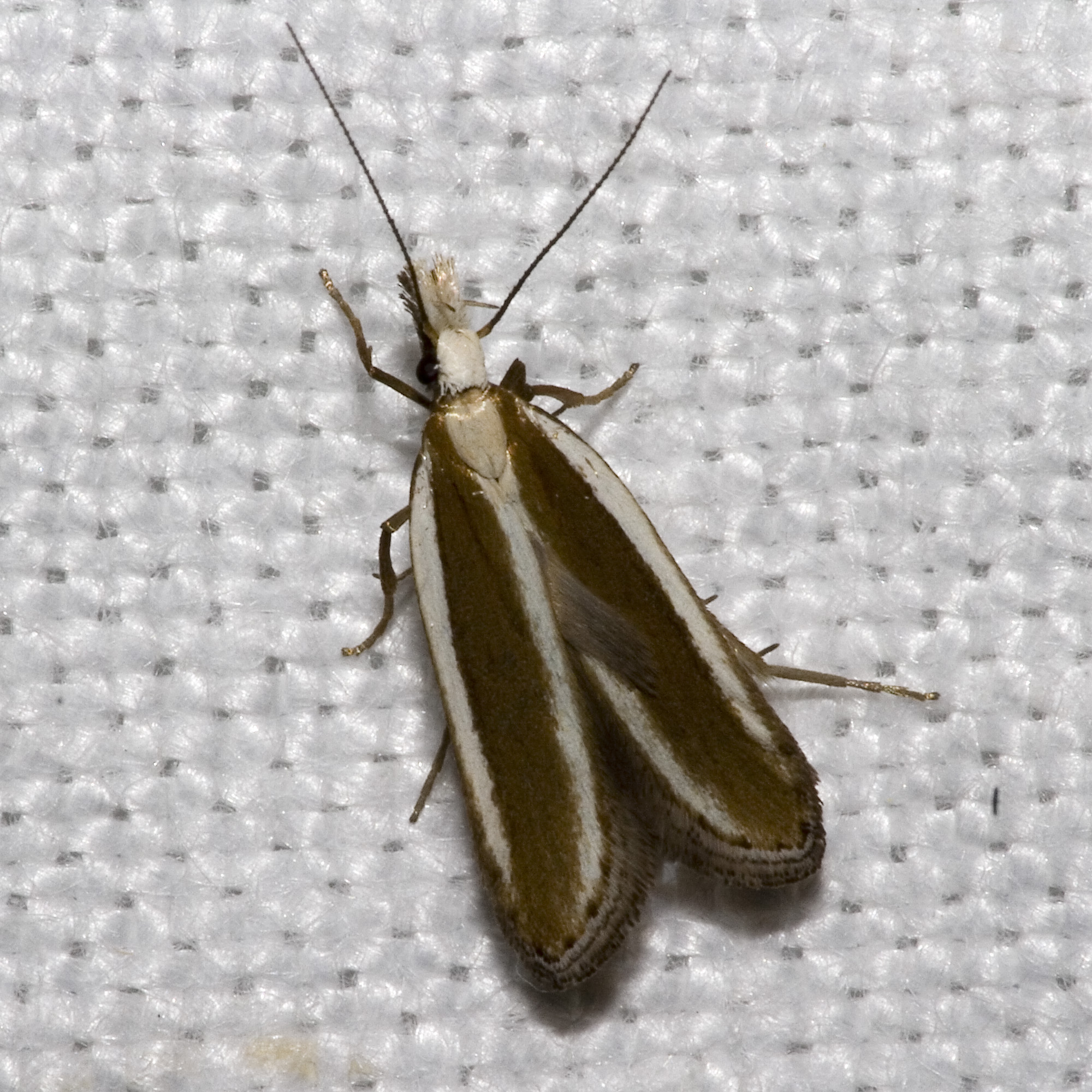

Scientific classification
- Domain: Eukaryota
- Kingdom: Animalia
- Phylum: Arthropoda
- Class: Insecta
- Order: Lepidoptera
- Family: Gelechiidae
- Genus: Dichomeris
- Species: D. marginella

Binomial name
- Dichomeris marginella (Fabricius, 1781)

Synonyms
- Alucita marginella Fabricius, 1781; Tinea fimbriella Thunberg, 1788; Tinea striatella Hübner, 1796; Palpula clarella Treitschke, 1833

= Dichomeris marginella =

Species of moth

Dichomeris marginella, the juniper webber, is a moth of the family Gelechiidae. It is found in Europe.

The wingspan is 14–16 mm. Labial palps grey, long, upturned. Forewings ochre with white or cream border along the costal and hind edges. Hindwings light grey.

The moths are on wing from May to August depending on the location.

The larvae feed on Juniperus communis, Juniperus chinensis, Juniperus horizontalis, Juniperus recurva and Juniperus virginiana forming silken webs between the needles.
