= Guemes (soil) =

Guemes series is the name given to a soil which has developed on colluvium, residuum or glacial till which is strongly influenced by ultramafic rock such as serpentinite. Most of its occurrences are on Cypress Island, where it is by far the most widespread soil series. Areas presently mapped as Guemes series were formerly mapped as Fidalgo series, but a separation was made due to the stronger influence of ultramafic rock on Cypress Island and a few other nearby islands.

Douglas-fir, western red cedar, and lodgepole pine dominate the tree canopy with Oregon grape, creambush ocean spray and rhododendron prominent among the shrubs.

The 100-year site index for Douglas-fir on Guemes soil is 115, comparable with non-ultramafic soils developed in a similar climate nearby (104 for Catla gravelly fine sandy loam, 130 for Clallam gravelly loam and 120 for Coveland gravelly loam).
