= Jardine Juniper =

Coordinates: 41.81605°N 111.63257°W

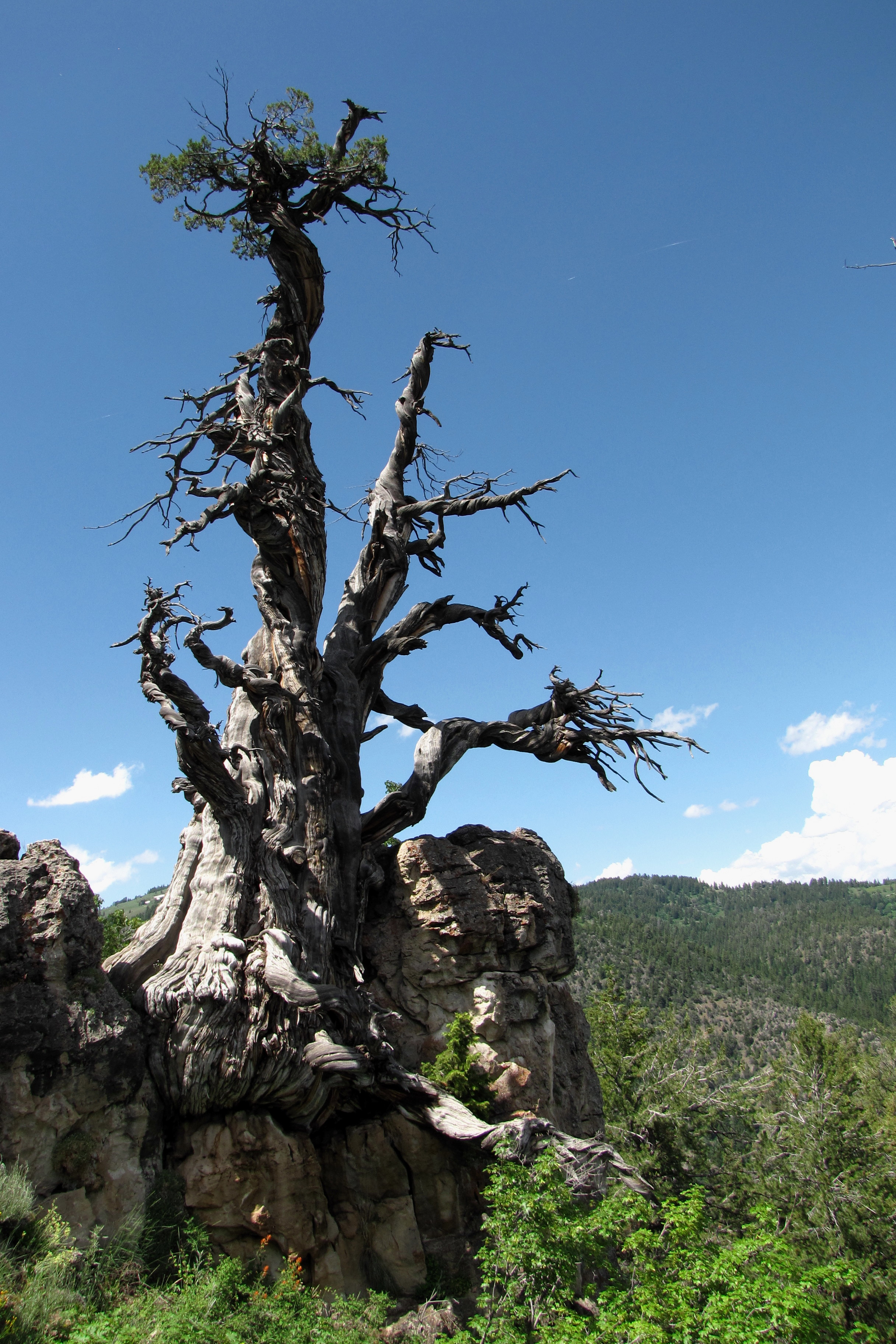
The Jardine Juniper in 2011

The Jardine Juniper is an individual of the species Rocky Mountain juniper found within Logan Canyon in the Cache National Forest. Often credited with an age of over 3,000 years, core samples taken in the 1950s revealed that it was around 1,500 years old. It stands approximately 40 feet (12 m) tall and its circumference has been measured at 284 inches (720 cm). Discovered in 1923 by Maurice Blood Linford while he was a student at Utah State Agricultural College (USAC), it was named after USAC alumnus and former U.S. Secretary of Agriculture William Marion Jardine (1879–1955).

== See also ==
- List of oldest trees
- List of individual trees
