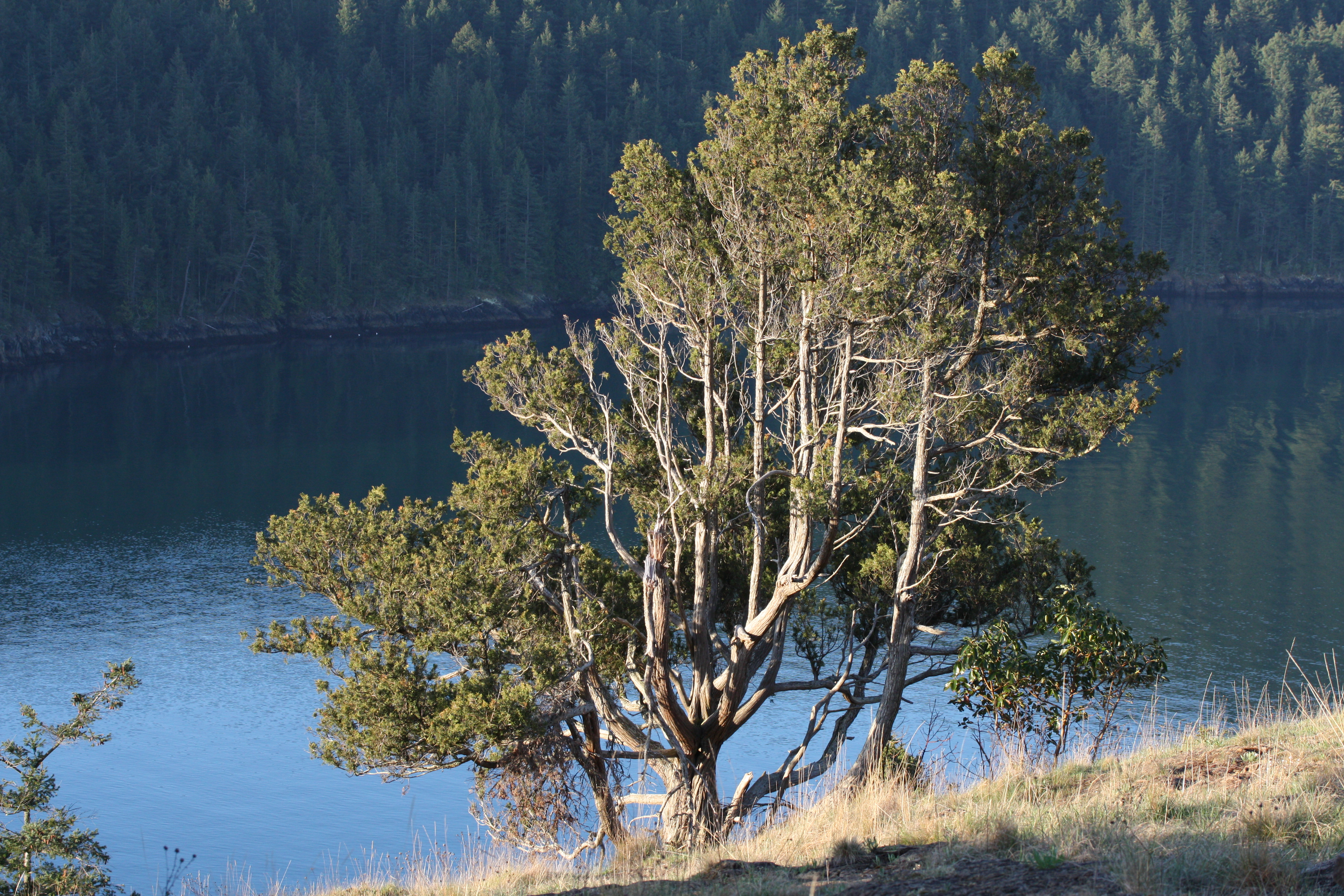
- J. maritima along Burrows Pass, Fidalgo Island

Conservation status
- Vulnerable (NatureServe)

Scientific classification
- Kingdom: Plantae
- Clade: Embryophytes
- Clade: Tracheophytes
- Clade: Gymnosperms
- Division: Pinophyta
- Class: Pinopsida
- Order: Cupressales
- Family: Cupressaceae
- Genus: Juniperus
- Species: J. maritima

Binomial name
- Juniperus maritima R.P.Adams, 2007
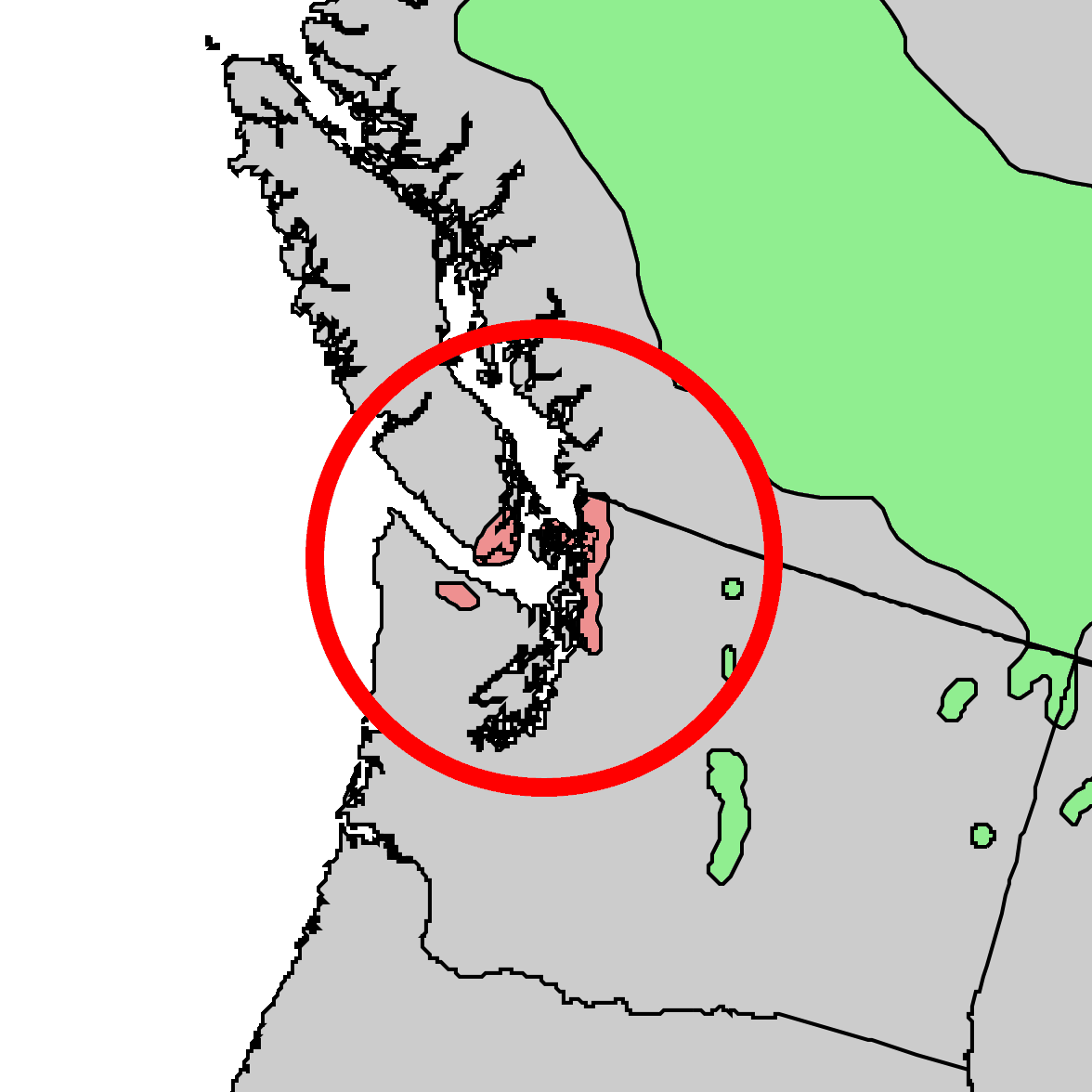
- Natural range of Juniperus maritima (circled and shaded in red). A section of the Juniperus scopulorum range is shaded in green.

= Juniperus maritima =

Species of conifer

Juniperus maritima is a species of juniper known by the common name seaside juniper. It is native to the central Salish Sea region in southwestern British Columbia and northwestern Washington, where it is an endemic species and is abundant on coast bluffs as well as on dry mountain ridges on the Olympic Peninsula. It was previously included in the description of the Rocky Mountain juniper (Juniperus scopulorum) but was separated in 2007. Genetic analysis revealed that what appeared to be Rocky Mountain junipers in the Puget Sound were not of the same species as those elsewhere. The Puget Sound species also differs in morphology, with faster-maturing cones that have protruding seeds, and other differences. It is especially unique in habitat. The seaside juniper occurs at the edge of the water, next to the sound or the nearby lakes, in a milder, wetter climate on sandy, granite soils, even sand dunes in one location. J. scopulorum grows in drier, rockier substrates in colder locations higher in the mountains. It is also noted that seaside juniper reproduces itself and does not interbreed with other junipers, further evidence that it should be called a separate species.

In general the seaside juniper is common to abundant in its native range; however, it is impacted by development at some sites and it can face competition from Douglas-fir.
