= Raymond Alvah Hanson =

Raymond Alvah Hanson (December 10, 1923 – February 18, 2009) was an American engineer and inventor from Spokane, Washington. He held over 100 patents, and created and produced equipment that was used on the Trans-Alaskan pipeline, canals in over 50 countries (including the California Aqueduct System) and the self-leveling control for hillside Combine Harvesters.

== Background ==
Hanson was born in Potlatch, Idaho in 1923, the son of Ray and Orda (Hensley) Hanson. The family later moved to the hills around Palouse, Washington. Hanson attended the University of Idaho, majoring in electrical engineering. In 1941, while farming in Palouse, he combined his engineering and farming knowledge in search of a better way to harvest the fertile but often steep slopes found in that area, leading to his first invention, the self-leveling control for hillside Combine harvesters. By 1945 the first self-leveling mechanisms were built.

Hanson founded the RAHCO Company to build self-leveling mechanisms, and since then, the company has grown into a major international player in the design and production of custom commercial machinery systems. RAHCO estimates that automatic leveling has saved at least 3% of grain harvested on lands where combine leveling is needed, worth millions of dollars each year.

Hanson subsequently began adapting the ideas and principles he had developed into further construction machines used for canal, highway, dam, and airport construction, including the largest canal finishing machinery in the world for the California aqueduct, the world's largest 2,000 ton gantry crane used in the Grand Coulee Dam power plant project, and equipment that has been used on the Trans-Alaskan pipeline project. Hanson has designed and marketed major construction machinery in more than 50 countries, with contracts totalling over $150 million.

Hanson died on February 18, 2009.

== Personal life ==
Hanson was married to Lois. At the time of his death, he had six children, 20 grandchildren and 24 great grandchildren.
