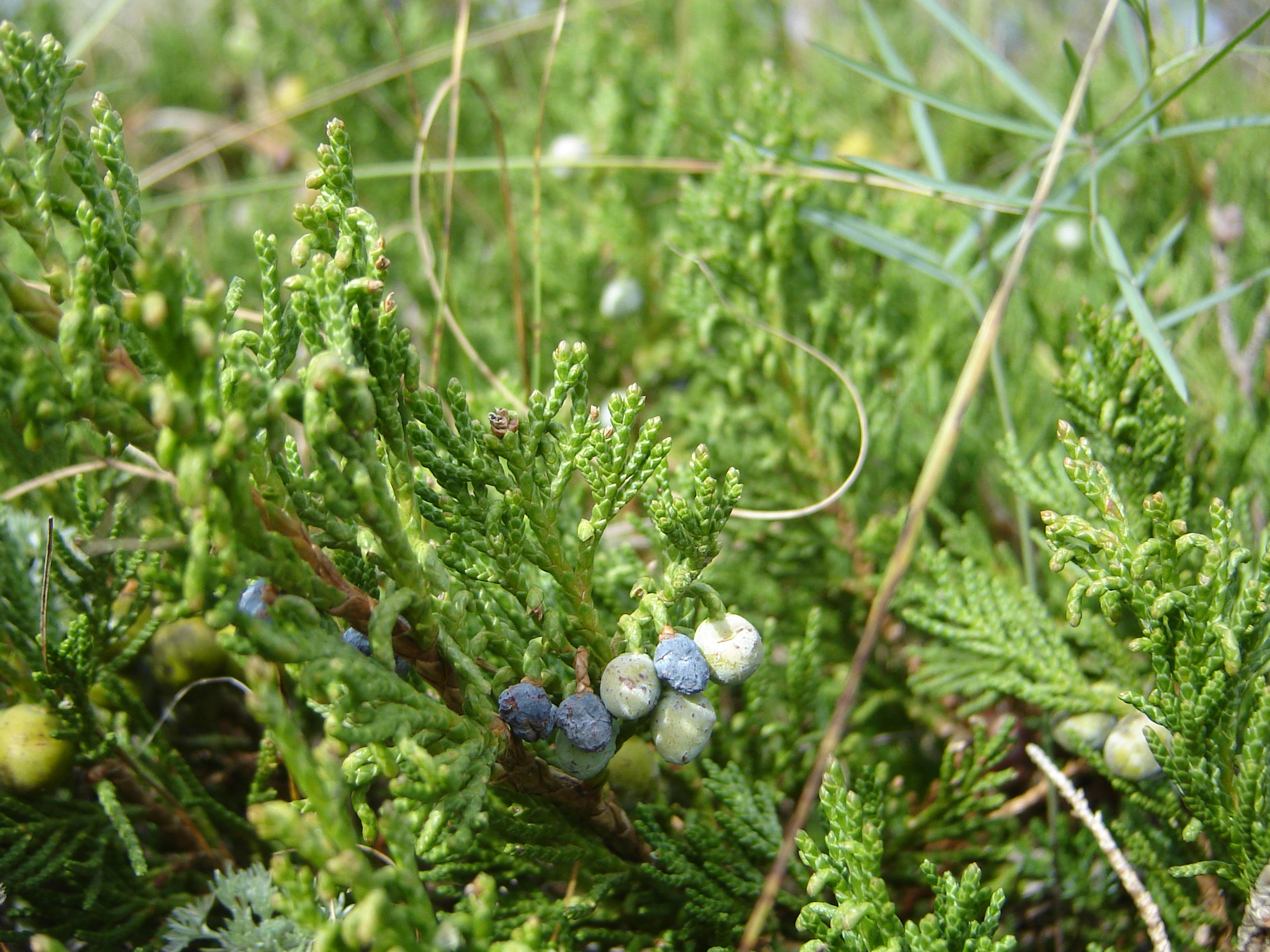
- Foliage and cones

Conservation status
- Least Concern (IUCN 3.1)

- Secure (NatureServe)

Scientific classification
- Kingdom: Plantae
- Clade: Tracheophytes
- Clade: Gymnospermae
- Division: Pinophyta
- Class: Pinopsida
- Order: Cupressales
- Family: Cupressaceae
- Genus: Juniperus
- Species: J. horizontalis

Binomial name
- Juniperus horizontalis Moench 1794
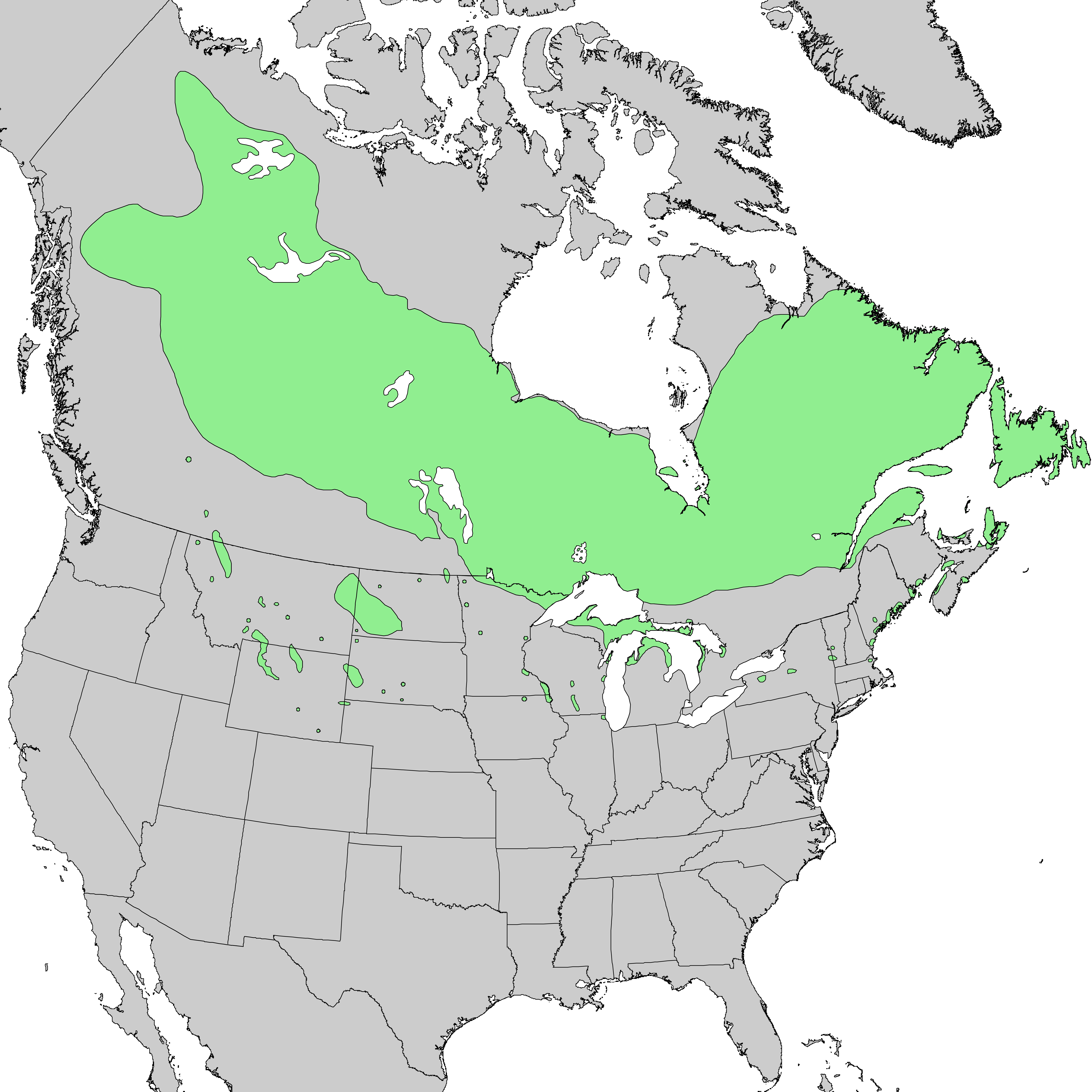
- Natural range of Juniperus horizontalis

Synonyms
- Juniperus prostrata Pers. 1807; Juniperus repens Nutt. 1818; Juniperus racemosa Risso 1826; Juniperus hudsonica Forbes 1839; Sabina prostrata (Pers.) Antoine 1857; Sabina racemosa (Risso) Antoine 1857; Sabina horizontalis (Moench) Rydb. 1912

= Juniperus horizontalis =

Species of conifer

Juniperus horizontalis, the creeping juniper or creeping cedar, is a low-growing shrubby juniper native to northern North America, throughout most of Canada from Yukon east to Newfoundland, and in some of the northern United States.

== Description ==
Living up to both its scientific and common names, the species reaches only 10–30 centimetres (3 7/8–11 3/4 in) tall but often spreading several metres wide. The shoots are slender, 0.7–1.2 millimetres (1/32–1/16 in) diameter. The leaves are arranged in opposite decussate pairs, or occasionally in whorls of three; the adult leaf blades are scale-like, 1–2 mm long (to 8 mm on lead shoots) and 1–1.5 mm (1/32–1/16 in) broad, and derive from an adnate petiole. The juvenile leaves (on young seedlings only) are needle-like, 5–10 mm (3/16–3/8 in) long. The cones are berry-like, globose to bilobed, 5–7 mm (3/16–9/32 in) in diameter, dark blue with a pale blue-white waxy bloom, and contain two seeds (rarely one or three); they usually have a curved stem and are mature in about 18 months. The male cones are 2–4 mm (3/32–5/32 in) long, and shed their pollen in early spring. It is dioecious, producing cones of only one sex on each plant.

It is closely related to Juniperus virginiana, and often hybridizes with it where their ranges meet in southern Canada. Hybrids with Juniperus scopulorum also occur.

== Distribution and habitat ==
The species is native to northern North America, throughout most of Canada from Yukon east to Newfoundland, and in the United States in Alaska, and continentally from Montana east to Maine, reaching its furthest south in Wyoming and northern Illinois. Amongst the sites it occupies are rocky areas of the east slopes of the Rocky Mountains.

== Cultivation and uses ==
Well over 100 different cultivars have been selected for use as ornamental plants in gardens, their strictly prostrate growth habit being valued for ground cover. Popular examples include 'Bar Harbor', 'Blue Acres', 'Emerald Spreader', 'Green Acres', and 'Wiltonii' ("Blue Rug Juniper"). Many of the most popular cultivars have strikingly glaucous foliage, while others are bright green, yellowish or variegated.

== Gallery ==
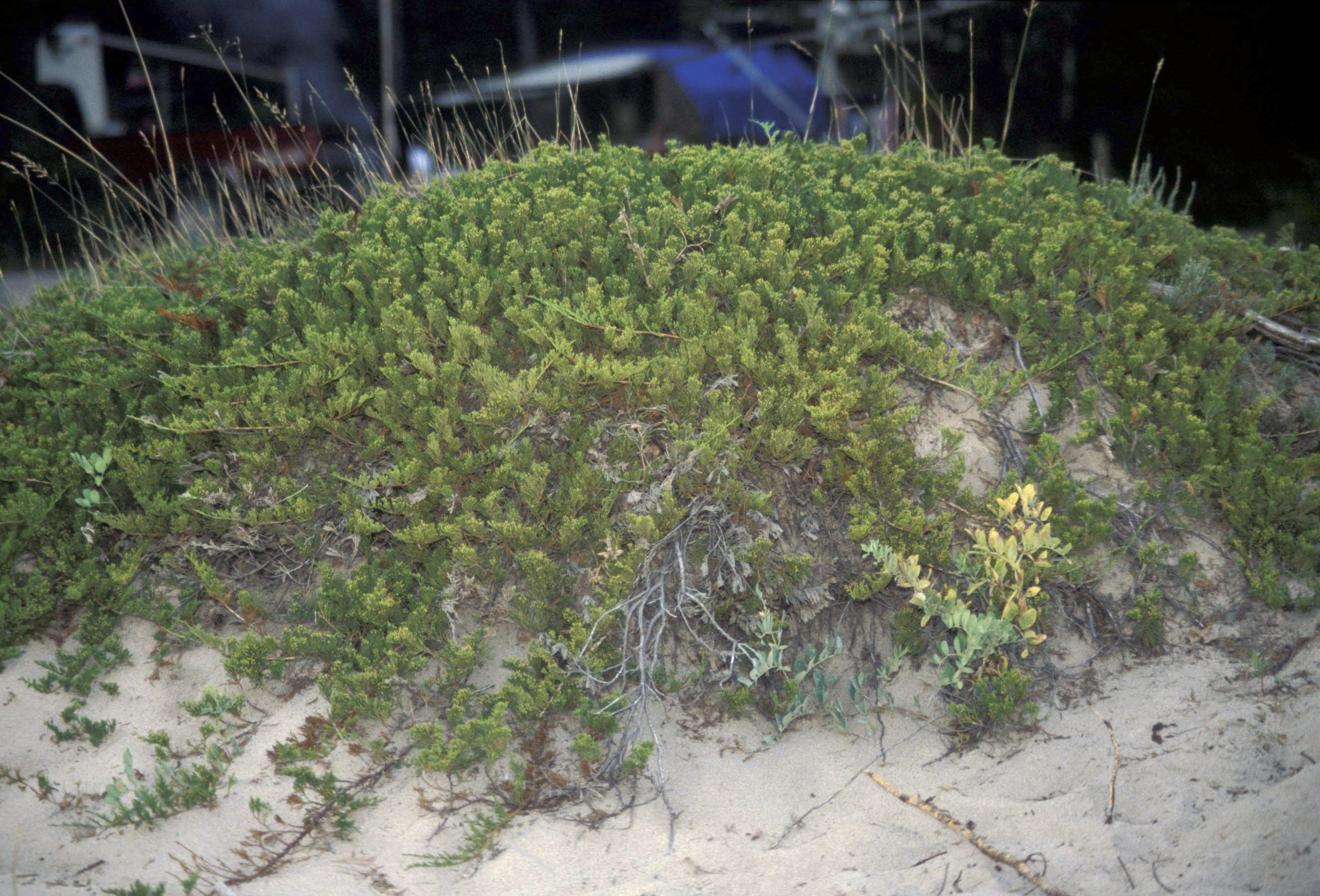
Plant at Pancake Bay sand dunes, Ontario, Canada

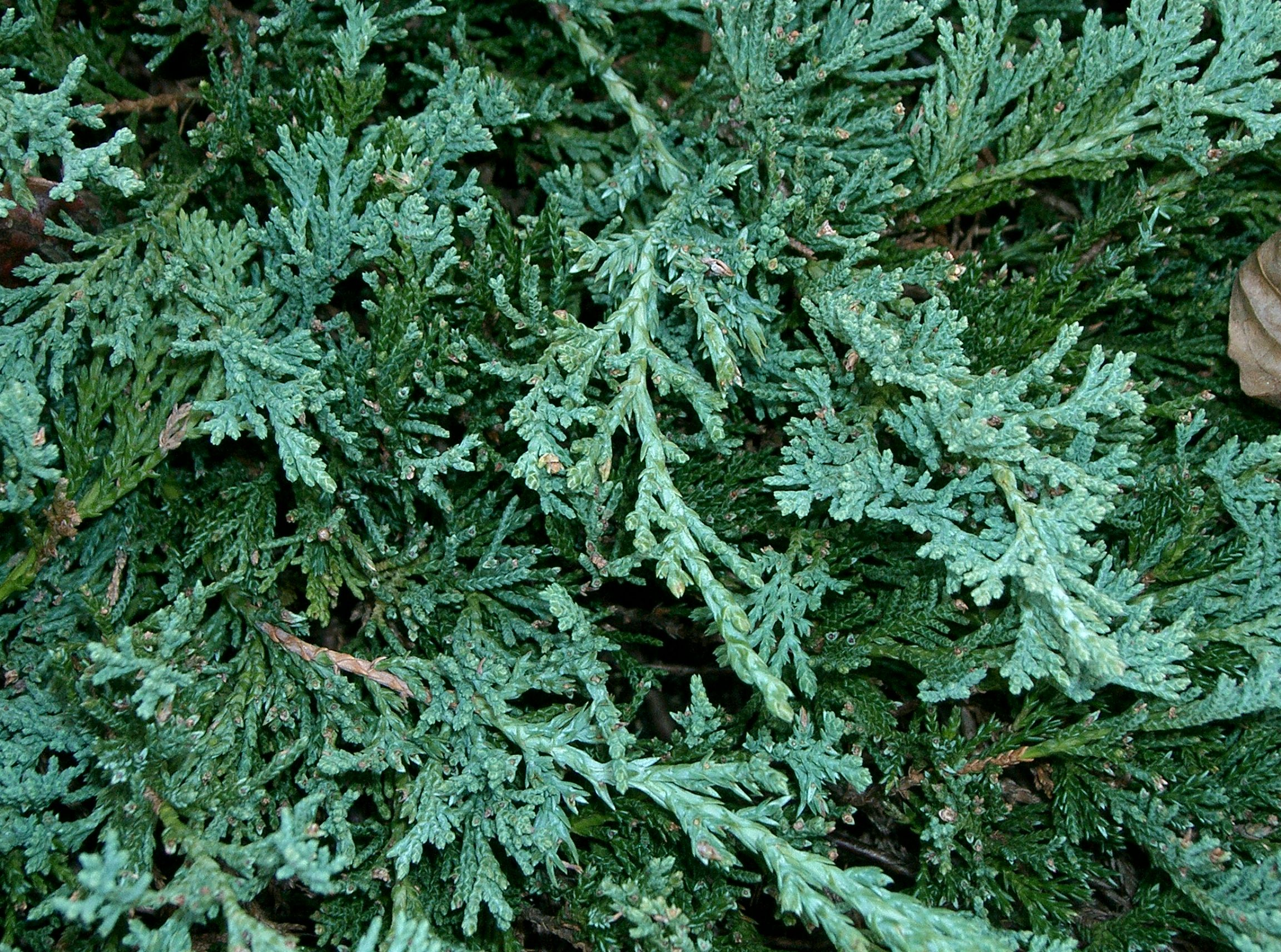
Juniperus horizontalis 'Wiltonii' as a garden plant
