= List of Norfolk Southern Railway lines =

Norfolk Southern Railway lines (highlighted in red, with trackage rights in purple, and haulage rights in lighter purple)

The Norfolk Southern Railway owns and operates a vast network of rail lines in the United States east of the Mississippi River. In addition to lines inherited from predecessor railroads, Norfolk and Western, and the Southern Railway, it acquired many lines as part of the split of the Conrail system in 1999.

== List of current lines (both owned and not owned) ==
- Not owned- Only well known secondary lines, delivery trackage and connecting trackage that are not owned by Norfolk Southern are included in division tables; non-well known secondary lines, delivery trackage and connecting trackage not owned by Norfolk Southern are not included in division tables.

Line	From	To	Notes
R-Line	Charlotte, North Carolina	Augusta, Georgia	The Lynx Blue Line in Charlotte now runs on the former right of way between Tyvola station and East 16th Street.
SB Line	Kingville, South Carolina	Rock Hill, South Carolina	Partly abandoned.
W Line	Asheville, North Carolina	Columbia, South Carolina	Includes the closed Saluda Grade.
TR Line	Hendersonville, North Carolina	Pisgah Forest, North Carolina	Ex-Southern line, branches off W Line at Hendersonville. Line sheltered in 2007. Original line went to Lake Toxaway, North Carolina. Track removed from south switch at Pisgah Forest, North Carolina, in 1984 to Rosman, North Carolina. Through Brevard, Line inactive since 2007 due to Ecusta Paper leaving plant in Pisgah Forest, which was razed in 2004 and 2005, now being developed for housing.
East River District	Bluefield, West Virginia	Walton, West Virginia	
Forrest District-C Line	Bement, Illinois	Gibson City, Illinois	Formerly Wabash 6th, 7th and 8th Districts, which ran from Chicago (Dearborn Station) to Effingham, IL. C Line partially abandoned from Manhattan, IL to Gibson City, IL and completely abandoned from Bement, Il to Effingham, IL. Currently operated, along with the Peoria District-SP line as the Bloomington District of the Illinois Division.
Peoria District-SP Line	Gibson City, Illinois	Peoria, Illinois	
=== Central Division === In 2017, the Central Division was split up among the Georgia, Alabama and Piedmont Divisions. === Midwest Division ===
District	From	To	Notes
Lafayette District-D Line	Peru, Indiana	Decatur, Illinois	former Wabash Railroad
Frankfort Branch- SP Line	Frankfort, Indiana	Lafayette, Indiana	former NKP, operates on Lafayette district to Decatur, Illinois and Peru, Indiana
Bloomington District (formerly part of Forrest District and Peoria District)	Bement, Illinois	East Peoria, Illinois	Bridge rights on Lafayette District from Bement, Illinois to Decatur, Illinois. Former Wabash Railroad 7th (Forrest) District (C Line) from Bement, Illinois to Gibson City, Illinois and former NKP Peoria District (SP Line) from Gibson City, Illinois to East Peoria, Illinois. Trackage rights over CN from Gibson City, Illinois to Chicago (unused since 2015). Trackage rights over TPW at East Peoria, Illinois. Trackage rights over TZPR from East Peoria, Illinois to Pekin, Illinois. Trackage rights on Union Pacific at Bloomington, Illinois to service AG Rail elevator.
Mansfield Branch- (UM Line) (or Urbana-Mansfield Line)	Mansfield, IL	Urbana, IL	former Peoria and Eastern Railway trackage purchased prior to Conrail merger. CN has trackage rights on this line from Champaign, Il to Rising, IL
Decatur Terminal	Decatur, IL	Decatur, IL	from CP Brush to CP Wabic, includes former Wabash Railroad and Illinois Terminal Railroad yards
Springfield-Hannibal District- DH and H Lines	Decatur, IL	Moberly, MO	former Wabash Railroad, historic Lincoln Depot beside this line. Interchanges with IMRR at Springfield, IL
Meredosia Branch- M Line	Meredosia, IL MP M471	Bluffs, IL MP M466	original Northern Cross line, predecessor to Wabash Railroad
Brooklyn District	Decatur, IL	St. Louis, MO	former Wabash Railroad
Madison Branch	Sorento, IL	Coffeen, IL	part of former NKP Cloverleaf District
Monterey Branch	Staunton, IL	Monterey, IL	
Alton District (T&E-Line) (or T&E Line; part of the Alton District, a rail corridor)	former Illinois Terminal Railroad line		
Alton District (A&E-Line) (or A&E Line; part of the Alton District, a rail corridor)	former Illinois Terminal Railroad line		
V&C Belt District	former Illinois Terminal Railroad line		
St. Louis District	Moberly, MO	St. Louis, MO	Former Wabash Railroad line.
Kansas City Terminal Area (formerly Kansas City Terminal)			Former Wabash Railroad line.
Kansas City District	Kansas City, MO	Moberly, MO	Former Wabash Railroad line.
Des Moines Terminal	Des Moines, IA	Des Moines, IA	Former Wabash Railroad Des Moines Union Terminal
Southern-East District	Louisville, KY	Princeton, IN	
Southern-West District	Princeton, IN	St. Louis, MO	
Cairo Branch			
Evansville Branch			
Rockport Branch			
Yankeetown Branch			
=== Great Lakes Division ===
District	From	To	Notes
Chicago Line (includes Berea Siding, No. 14 Track, Nasby Siding, Swanton Siding, Archbold Siding)	Cleveland, OH	Chicago, IL	Former NYC Mainline
Cloggsville Line	Cleveland, OH	Cleveland, OH	Connection track from Chicago Line to Lake Erie District. Starts off at Rockport Yard and ends at Cloggsville connection on the Lake Erie District.
Kankakee Line	Kankakee, IL	Schneider, IN	Former NYC Illinois Division/Kankakee Belt Route
Kankakee Branch			
Miami Cut Branch and Oakdale Connecting Track (formerly Oakdale Connection)			
Toledo Belt Connecting Track			
Randall Industrial Track (commonly abbreviated as Randall I.T., formerly Randall Secondary)			
Lansing Secondary			
Stanley Secondary			
CR&I Industrial Track	Chicago	Chicago	Former Chicago Junction Railway
Chicago District			
Lake Erie District—Lake Division			
Calumet River Industrial Track	Chicago	Chicago	Former Calumet River Railway; later South Chicago and Southern Railroad
Detroit Line	Toledo, OH	Gibraltar, MI	Former NYC
Kalamazoo Branch (includes Cowling to Park Signaled Siding)	Elkhart, Indiana	Grand Rapids, Michigan	Currently leased to the Grand Elk Railroad
Michigan Line	Dearborn, MI	Kalamazoo, MI	Former NYC
Toledo District	Bellevue, OH	Toledo, OH	Former W&LE
R.R. Donnelley Industrial Lead			
Nipsco Industrial Track (or Nipsco I.T.)			
R.T.A. Track			
Lansing Industrial Track (or Lansing I.T.)			
SC&S Industrial Track (or SC&S I.T.)			
BRC Connection Track 509			
Horn Track			
Chicago Terminal District	Gary, IN	Manhattan, IL	Portion of former Wabash Railroad 6th District operated by Metra between Manhattan, IL and Landers Yard
Clinton Industrial Track (or Clinton I.T.)			
West Park Industrial Track (or West Park I.T.)			
See Dearborn Division Track Chart, 2008.
=== Georgia Division ===
District	From	To	Notes
Albany District	Macon, GA	Albany, GA	
Atlanta North District	Chattanooga, TN	Atlanta, GA	From DeButts Yard in Chatt. to Inman Yard in Atlanta. Hapeville Auto Terminal (or Hapeville Automobile Terminal) is included in line's timetable.
Atlanta South District	Atlanta, GA	Macon, GA	Also known as the 'H' Line
Howell Main Line (Howell Main Line No. 1 and Main Line No. 2)			It is part of Atlanta South District timetable.
Bonsal Track			It is part of Atlanta South District timetable.
Atlanta Terminal			It is part of Atlanta South District timetable.
Augusta District (includes Winthorpe North End Wye Switch and North Wye Switch, Augusta)	Millen, GA	Augusta, GA	Former CG rail line and was called Augusta District under CG Ownership. The line branches off Savannah District at Millen.
Brunswick District (or Brunswick District Main Line)	Macon, GA	Brunswick, GA	Originally the main line of the Macon and Brunswick Railroad
Camak District	Waynesboro, GA	Warrenton, GA	Has trackage rights on CSX Warrenton, GA to Camak, GA
Cohutta District (or I Line by local railfans)	Cleveland, TN	Cohutta, GA	From Cleveland Yard to connection with Atlanta North District. It was part of the East Tennessee & Georgia Railroad
Columbus District (includes Geneva Siding)	Fort Valley, GA	Columbus, GA	
Dothan District (includes Long Siding)	Albany, GA	Dothan, AL	Ex-Central of Georgia; Line from Hilton to Dothan sold to Chattahoochee and Gulf Railroad in 2003; Line from Albany to Hilton sold to Hilton and Albany Railroad in 2011.
Dublin District	Tennille, GA	Dublin, GA	Branch off Savannah District at Tennille
Eatonton District	Gordon, GA	Eatonton, GA	Branch off Savannah District at Gordon
Fairbanks District			
Turtle River Lead			
Training Center/Liberty Industrial Park Lead (includes Liberty Industrial Park Lead Track switch)			
Macon Terminal (includes Runaround Track)			
Hester Industrial Lead (or Hester Industrial Lead — Hazelhurst)			
Ruby Lead			
Overton Connection			
Waynesboro Wye (or Waynesboro Wye Track)			
Pocket Track			
Dooley Hill Track			
Greenwood District			
Griffin District	Atlanta, GA	Macon, GA	Also known as the 'S' Line
Morrow Storage Track (located in Morrow Industrial Park			
Krannert District	Rome, GA	Krannert, GA	
Macon District	Macon, GA	Valdosta, GA	Norfolk Southern's main line to Florida. Part of the former Georgia Southern and Florida Railway
Bay Street Lead			
Millen Wye			
Thomaston Loop			
Madison District			
Moores District			
Navair District			Part of the former Georgia Southern and Florida Railway
Norcross District	Norcross, GA	Atlanta, GA	Continues into Piedmont Division
Savannah District	Macon, GA	Savannah, GA	Former CG rail line and was called Savannah District under CG Ownership.
Dillard Yard			
A&F Lead			
Colonial Lead			
C&S Lead			
Thomaston District	Barnesville, GA	Thomaston, GA	
Valdosta District	Valdosta, GA	Jacksonville, FL	Originally the Atlantic, Valdosta and Western Railway
See Georgia Division Track Chart, 2002.
=== Alabama Division ===
District	From	To	Notes
East End District	Austell, GA	Birmingham, AL	
NA/West End District	Birmingham, AL	Memphis, TN	
Berry Branch			
3-B North District	Birmingham, AL	Selma, AL	
3-B South District	Selma, AL	Mobile, AL	
Central of Georgia District	Leeds, AL	Columbus, GA	A former Central of Georgia Railway line
Anniston District			
M&G District			
AGS North District	Chattanooga, TN	Irondale, AL	Ownership under Norfolk Southern's Alabama Great Southern Railroad subsidiary
AGS South District	Irondale, AL	Meridian, MS	Ownership under Norfolk Southern's Alabama Great Southern Railroad subsidiary
N.O & N.E. District			Ownership under Norfolk Southern's Alabama Great Southern Railroad subsidiary, a former New Orleans and Northeastern Railroad line.
Mahrt District (also known as Mahrt Branch)			
Cedartown District	Green, GA	Senoia, GA	Former CG line and was called Cedartown District under CG ownership. Connects on north end with NS Atlanta North District, with connections to the Birmingham East District at Bremen. The line used to connect with the Former CG Griffin district, but now is cut in downtown Senoia.
Memphis District — East End	Stevenson, AL MP 280	Sheffield Yard, AL MP 402	includes Stevenson Siding and Decatur Siding, part of the Memphis District, a rail corridor
Memphis District — West End	Sheffield Yard, AL MP 402	Memphis, TN MP 551	Mainline running from Sheffield, Alabama to Memphis, Tennessee with an intermodal facility in Rossville, Tennessee. Predecessor railroads on this line include the Memphis & Charleston Railroad and the Southern Railway (U.S.).
Memphis District — IC District (or IC District; part of the Memphis District, a rail corridor)			
Greenville District (Alabama Division version)			
Autauga Creek District (includes Autauga Creek Siding)			
Demopolis District	Marion Junction, AL	Demopolis, AL	
Madison Branch (includes Box Company Runaround and Gold Star Lead, plus Gold Star Lead Switch)			
Dunlop Lead			
No. 2 Lead (or Number 2 Lead)			
No. 3 Lead (or Number 3 Lead)			
Upriver Lead			
Scottsboro Storage Track			
Hot Band Track			
Sheffield Terminal			
Champion Lead			
Saulsbury Old House Track			
Loyall Track			
Denbo Track			
Emco Branch			
Occidental Lead			
Lehigh Lead			
Bernadotte Line			
Birmingham Terminal — Ensley Branch (or simply Ensley Branch, only property of the Birmingham Terminal)			
New Orleans Terminal — Back Belt Line (or simply Back Belt Line, part of New Orleans Terminal)			
New Orleans Terminal — Chalmette Branch, Louisiana Southern Branch (or simply Chalmette Branch and Louisiana Southern Branch, part of New Orleans Terminal)			
New Orleans Terminal — Toca Branch (or simply Toca Branch, part of New Orleans Terminal)			
Muscadine Spur			
Coal Track			
South Transfer Track			
AG Branch			
Pell City Industrial Park Lead			
Woodlawn-Bessemer Branch			
Potter Track			
Berry Branch			
Alta Lead			
N-Line			
C-Line			
WA-Line			
MA-Line			
Riverdale Lead			
AGR East Connection			
AGR West Connection			
AGR Main Track at Demopolis			
AGR Connection Track			
Blue Circle Lead			
Mahrt Branch (also known as NU Line)			
Bon Air Track			
See Alabama Division Employee Timetables, 2008.
=== Keystone Division ===
District	From	To	Notes
Ashmore Secondary	Penn Haven Junction, PA	West Hazleton, PA	Former LV
Buffalo Line	Driftwood, PA	Rockville, PA	Former PRR
C&F Secondary	Alburtis, PA	Seiple, PA	Former RDG
Cement Secondary	Bethlehem, PA	Stockertown, PA	Former LNE
Columbia Secondary	Lancaster, PA	Columbia, PA	Former PRR
Corning Secondary	Geneva, NY	Corning, NY	Former NYC
Dale Secondary (part of the Trenton Cutoff, a rail corridor)	Plymouth, PA	Glenloch, PA	The Dale Secondary is part of a rail corridor called the Trenton Cutoff. The Trenton Cutoff opened as a rail line until it was split into two tracks: Dale Secondary and Morrisville Line, becoming a rail corridor. The Trenton Cutoff is a former PRR property.
Delmarva Secondary (part of the Delmarva Business Unit, a rail corridor)	Newark, DE	Porter, DE	Former PRR. Section between Porter, DE and Pocomoke City, MD leased to Delmarva Central Railroad in 2016.
Harrisburg Line	Philadelphia, PA	Harrisburg, PA	Former RDG
Hudson Secondary	Campbell Hall, NY	Warwick, NY	Former LHR; leased to NYSW
Indian River Secondary (part of the Delmarva Business Unit, a rail corridor)	Harrington, DE	Frankford, DE	Former PRR. Leased to Delmarva Central Railroad in 2016.
Ithaca Secondary	Waverly, NY	Ithaca, NY	Former LV. Leased to Ithaca Central Railroad in 2018.
Lake Erie District	Buffalo, NY	Blasdell, NY	Former NKP. Line continues into Pittsburgh Division
Lehigh Line	Manville, NJ	M&H Junction, PA	Former LV with former CNJ leased trackage. NS has access into the New Jersey Terminal area via the Conrail Lehigh Line, which is a continuation of this line.
Lehigh Secondary	Mehoopany, PA	Waverly, NY	Former LV. Leased to Lehigh Railway.
Lititz Secondary	Lancaster, PA	Lititz, PA	Former RDG
Lurgan District	Harrisburg, PA	Hagerstown, MD	Former RDG and PRR
Morrisville Line (part of the Trenton Cutoff, a rail corridor)	Morrisville, PA	King of Prussia, Pennsylvania	The Morrisville Line is part of a rail corridor called the Trenton Cutoff. The Trenton Cutoff opened as a rail line until it was split into two tracks: Morrisville Line and Dale Secondary, becoming a rail corridor. The Trenton Cutoff is a former PRR property.
New Castle Secondary (part of the Delmarva Business Unit, a rail corridor)	South Wilmington, DE	Porter, DE	Former PRR
New Holland Secondary	Lancaster, PA	New Holland, PA	Former PRR
Pittsburgh Line	Harrisburg, PA	Duncannon, PA	Former PRR. Line continues into Pittsburgh Division
Port Road Branch	Perryville, MD	Enola, PA	Former PRR
Portland Secondary	Easton, PA	Portland, PA	Former PRR and DLW
Pottsville Branch	Reading, PA	Muhlenberg Township, PA	Former RDG
Reading Line	Wyomissing, PA	Bethlehem, PA	Former RDG
Roxburg Secondary	Harmony, NJ	Belvidere, NJ	Former PRR
Royalton Branch	Shocks Mills, PA	Harrisburg, PA	Former PRR
Shellpot Secondary (part of the Delmarva Business Unit, a rail corridor)	Bellefonte, DE	Newport, DE	Former PRR
Shippensburg Secondary	Wormleysburg, PA	Carlisle, PA	Former PRR
Southern Tier Line	Binghamton, NY	Buffalo, NY	Mostly a former Erie line. A small portion was DLW. The line continues as ex-Southern Tier Line trackage leased to NYS&W from Binghamton to Port Jervis, NY, ex-Southern Tier Line trackage leased to MNR from Suffern to Port Jervis for the Port Jervis Line service, and NJT Main Line to Hoboken, NJ. NS retains ownership from Binghamton to Suffern and retains trackage rights to Secaucus.
Stony Creek Branch	Norristown, Pennsylvania	Lansdale, Pennsylvania	Former RDG
Stroudsburg Secondary	Portland, Pennsylvania	Slateford, Pennsylvania	Former DLW leased by D-L
Sunbury Line	Sunbury, Pennsylvania	Binghamton, New York	Former DLW (mainline, includes Nicholson Cutoff) and former PRR (Wilkes-Barre Branch). Ownership of trackage later transferred to PC, EL, D&H and CPR.
Washington Secondary	Phillipsburg, New Jersey	Hackettstown, New Jersey	Former DLW. Leased to Dover and Delaware River Railroad in 2019.
Watsontown Secondary	Watsontown, Pennsylvania	Strawberry Ridge, Pennsylvania	Former PRR
York Secondary	York Haven, Pennsylvania	York, Pennsylvania	Former PRR
Morrisville Connecting Track	Norristown, Pennsylvania	Plymouth Township, PA	
Wood Connecting Track			
Norristown Line − SEPTA (or simply Norristown Line)	Norristown, Pennsylvania	Center City, Philadelphia	Former RDG line, Owned by SEPTA
Allentown Consolidated Terminal	Allentown, Pennsylvania	Bethlehem, Pennsylvania	
Baltimore Consolidated Terminal			
Buffalo Consolidated Terminal			
Harrisburg Consolidated Terminal			
Lancaster Consolidated Terminal			
North Jersey Consolidated Terminal			
See Harrisburg Division Track Chart, 2008.
=== Great Lakes Division ===
District	From	To	Notes
Cincinnati District	Cincinnati, Ohio	Portsmouth, Ohio	Former NW. Out of Service East of Peebles. West of Peebles to Cincinnati the line is leased to Cincinnati Eastern Railroad.
Cleveland District	Bellevue, Ohio	Cleveland, Ohio	Former NKP
Cleveland District/Fairlane Yard	Cleveland, Ohio	Cleveland, Ohio	
Chicago District	Chicago	Fort Wayne, Indiana	Former N&W line and was called Chicago District under N&W ownership.
Columbus District	Portsmouth, Ohio	Columbus, Ohio	
Dayton District	Columbus, Ohio	Cincinnati, Ohio	Former PRR and NYC
Fostoria District	Fort Wayne, Indiana	Bellevue, Ohio	Former NKP
Lima District	Lima, Ohio	Arcadia, Ohio	Was grouped with Frankford District in one employee timetable.
New Castle District	Cincinnati, Ohio	Fort Wayne, Indiana	Former PRR and NKP
Sandusky District	Columbus, Ohio	Sandusky, Ohio	Former NW
Toledo District	Toledo, Ohio	Bellevue, Ohio	Former NW
Western Branch	Bannon, Ohio	Columbus, Ohio	
Michigan City Branch			Former N&W line and was previously known as Michigan City District under N&W ownership.
Fort Wayne Terminal			
Buckeye Terminal			
Detroit Terminal			
Bellevue Terminal			
Buckeye Branch			
Woodburn Branch	New Haven, IN	Woodburn, IN	
West Detroit Branch			
Huron Branch	Berlin Township, OH	Huron, OH	
West Virginia Branch			
South Lorain Branch	Sheffield, OH	Sheffield, OH	
Red Key Secondary			
Detroit District	Montpelier, Ohio	Detroit, Michigan	Former WAB line which was passed to N&W and was called Detroit District under N&W ownership. It is formerly known as Detroit to Montpelier—3rd District (or Montpelier to Detroit−3rd District) under WAB. Part of Detroit to Peru (or Detroit and Huntington District), a former N&W rail corridor.
Huntington District	Peru, Indiana	Montpelier, Ohio	Former WAB line which was passed to N&W and was called Huntington District under N&W ownership. It is formerly known as Montpelier to Peru—1st District (or Peru to Montpelier−1st District) under WAB. Part of Detroit to Peru (or Detroit and Huntington District), a former N&W rail corridor.
Frankfort District	Peru, Indiana	Montpelier, Ohio	Was grouped with Lima District in one employee timetable.
Marion District	Elkhart, Indiana	Anderson, Indiana	
=== Piedmont Division ===
District	From	To	Notes
SC Line	Charleston, SC	Columbia, SC	
Charlotte Terminal			
N&W Belt Line	Durham, North Carolina	Durham, North Carolina	Former N&W line
Battleground Lead			
Peachtree Corners Lead			
Porter Woodyard			
Commerce Passing Track			
Catawba Lead			
Plant Marshall Industrial Lead			
Buford Pass Track			
Salisbury Wye			
Gurley Lead			
Arrowood Industrial and Arrowood Lead Track			
Pass Track Boylan			
Donaldson Lead			
Chester Industrial Lead			
Linwood Terminal			
Asheville Terminal			
Washington District	Alexandria, Virginia	Lynchburg, Virginia	The line consists of 2 railroad segments: Washington District − Alexandra to Montview and Washington District − Calverton to Cassanova. The line is part of the ex-Southern Main Line. Washington District − Manassas to Edinburg is not part of the Washington District, it is its own rail line called the B-Line.
B-Line	Strasburg, Virginia	Manassas, Virginia	It is mistakenly referred to as part of the Washington District because it is labeled Washington District − Manassas to Edinburg on employee timetables, it is not part of the Washington District, and it is its own separate rail line; B-Line is the official name of the rail line and not Washington District − Manassas to Edinburg. The line between Broadway and Riverton Junction in Front Royal is inactive, with the section from Strasburg to Riverton Junction filed for abandonment in 2025.
Danville District	Lynchburg, Virginia	Salisbury, North Carolina	The line consists of 9 railroad segments: Danville District − Montview to Salisbury, Danville District − Stokesland to Spray, Danville District − Greensboro to Cumnock West, Danville District − Pomona to Rural Hall, Danville District − Winston-Salem to Charlotte, Danville District − High Point to Asheboro, Danville District − Greensboro to Fetner, Danville District − Glenn to Chapel Hill, Dannville District − Oxford to East Durham. The line is part of the ex-Southern Main Line.
	Danville, Virginia	Eden, North Carolina	Also known as DW Line, former Danville and Western Railroad
	Greensboro, North Carolina	Cumnock, North Carolina	Also known as the CF Line. Former Atlantic and Yadkin.
	Greensboro, North Carolina	Rural Hall, North Carolina	Abandoned
	Greensboro, North Carolina	Goldsboro, North Carolina	Also known as the NC Line. Before 2020 known as the H Line.
	Winston-Salem, North Carolina	Charlotte, North Carolina	Route through Barber Junction known as NS L line and NS O Line.
	High Point, North Carolina	Asheboro, North Carolina	Asheboro Branch, also known as the M Line
State University Railroad	Glenn, North Carolina	Chapel Hill, North Carolina	Chapel Hill is the end of the line, also known as the J Line
	Durham, North Carolina	Oxford, North Carolina	Also known as the D Line
Raleigh District	Raleigh, North Carolina	Fayetteville, North Carolina	
CNLA District	Raleigh, North Carolina	Washington, North Carolina	
A&EC District	Goldsboro, North Carolina	Morehead City, North Carolina	
	New Bern, North Carolina	Washington, North Carolina	
Charlotte District (also known as R Line)	Greenville, South Carolina	Charlotte, North Carolina	The line consists of 5 railroad segments: Charlotte District − Salisbury to Greenville, Charlotte District − Yadkin Junction to Halls Ferry, Charlotte District − Bowlin to Gebo, Charlotte District − Spartanburg to Landrum, Charlotte District − Donaldson Junction to Michelin. The line is part of the ex-Southern Main Line.
Norcross District	Norcross, Georgia	Atlanta, Georgia	Continues into Georgia Division
	Salisbury, North Carolina	Halls Ferry, North Carolina	Also known as the D Line
	Gastonia, North Carolina	Bowlin, South Carolina	Ex-Carolina and Northwestern Railway line to Chester, SC; Bowlin is the end of the line near the NC border.
Greenville District	Greenville, South Carolina	Atlanta, Georgia	The line consists of four railroad segments: Greenville District − Greenville to Inman Yard, Greenville District − C&G Junction to Piedmont, Greenville District − Anderson to Walhalla, and Greenville District − Lula to Center. The line is part of the ex-Southern Main Line.
Columbia District	Charlotte, North Carolina	Columbia, South Carolina	The line consists of four railroad segments: Columbia District − Columbia to Beaumont, Columbia District − Charlotte to Columbia, Columbia District − Columbia to Augusta, Columbia District − Prosperity to Conrad, and Columbia District − Warrenville to Oakwood.
Asheville District (also known as the S line)	Salisbury, North Carolina	Asheville, North Carolina	The line consists of one railroad segment: Asheville District − Salisbury to Murphy Junction.
East Carolina Business Unit			The line consists of 6 railroad segments: East Carolina Business Unit − Goldsboro to Fetner, East Carolina Business Unit − Morehead City to Goldsboro, East Carolina Business Unit − Havelock to LeJeune, East Carolina Business Unit − Raleigh North to Cumnock, East Carolina Business Unit − Varina to Fayetteville, East Carolina Business Unit − Chocowinity to New Bern, and East Carolina Business Unit − Aurora to Phosphate Junction.
=== Pittsburgh Division ===
District	From	To	Notes
Cleveland Line (includes Mahoning Siding)	Rochester, Pennsylvania	Ravenna, Ohio	Former PRR. Line continues into Dearborn Division
Conemaugh Line	New Florence, Pennsylvania	Pittsburgh, Pennsylvania	Former PRR
Fort Wayne Line	Pittsburgh, Pennsylvania	Crestline, Ohio	Former PRR Pittsburgh to Chicago Main Line. Line continues to Fort Wayne, IN under CSX ownership.
Lake Erie District	Cleveland, Ohio	Buffalo, NY	Former NKP, formerly known as Buffalo District and was part of the NS Lake Division.
Meadville Line	Meadville, PA	Hubbard, OH	
Mon Line	West Brownsville, Pennsylvania	Pittsburgh, Pennsylvania	
Pittsburgh Line (Note: Includes Main 9 Track, Main 8 Track, No. 3 Track, No. 4 Track, No. 1 Pitt Track)	Duncannon, Pennsylvania	Pittsburgh, Pennsylvania	Former PRR. Line continues into Harrisburg Division
River Line	Powhatan Point, Ohio	Yellow Creek, Ohio	
Youngstown Line	Ashtabula, Ohio	Rochester, Pennsylvania	
Keystone Branch	Saltsburg, Pennsylvania	Shelocta, Pennsylvania	Services Keystone Power Generating Station and Rosebud Mining Crooked Creek Mine loadout
Manor Branch	Waynesburg, Pennsylvania	Graysville, Pennsylvania	Services prep plant at Bailey Mine
Miracle Run Branch			
Port Perry Branch			
Waynesburg Southern Branch			
Captina Secondary			
Cove Secondary (formerly Cove Secondary Track)			
Ellsworth Secondary			
Koppel Secondary (formerly Koppel Secondary Track)	Wampum, PA	Homewood, PA	
Lordstown Secondary (formerly Lordstown Secondary Track)	Maple Ridge, OH	Youngstown, OH	
Loveridge Secondary			
Niles Secondary (formerly Niles Secondary Track)	Johnston Township, OH	Warren, OH	
No. 2 Secondary (or Number 2 Secondary, formerly No. 2 Secondary Track or Number 2 Secondary Track)			
South Fork Secondary (formerly South Fork Secondary Track)			
Weirton Secondary (formerly Weirton Secondary Track)			
Altoona Terminal			Employee timetable name for Altoona Works.
Ashtabula Terminal			
Conway Terminal			Employee timetable name for Conway Yard.
Fairport Branch	Perry, Ohio	Fairport Harbor, Ohio	Was part of NS Lake Division, not on employee timetable.
Omal Running Track (or Omal R.T.)			
Rose Connecting Track			
"O" Track			
Hall Running Track			
Fairport Industrial Track (or Fairport I.T.)			
Hall Running Track			
Angola Storage Track (or Angola Stg. Track)			
Crestline Connecting Track			
Island Connecting Track			
Blairsville Industrial Track (or Blairsville I.T.)			
Sewickley Team Track			
Harding Industrial Track (or Harding I.T.)			
See Pittsburgh Division Track Chart, 2008 and Pittsburgh Division Employee Timetable, 2008
=== Pocahontas Division ===
District	From	To	Notes
Clinch Valley District	Bluefield, Virginia	Norton, Virginia	The line is a former N&W line and assumed its current name under N&W ownership.
Clinch Valley Extension			
Kenova District	Williamson, West Virginia	Portsmouth, Ohio	
Pocahontas District and Williamson District (written as Pocahontas/Williamson Districts)	Bluefield, West Virginia	Williamson, West Virginia	The line is a former N&W line and the whole line was originally called the Pocahontas District under N&W ownership.
Princeton–Deepwater District	Kellysville, West Virginia	Deep Water, West Virginia	Former VGA and later N&W property, it was originally two N&W lines: Princeton District and Deepwater District. The route combined was called the Kellysville to D.B. Tower rail corridor. All properties were started as part of the Virginian Railway main line.
Tug Fork Branch			
Sand Lick Branch			
South Fork Branch			
Gilbert Branch			Former N&W line.
Ben Creek Spur			
Briar Mountain Branch			
Delmore Branch			
Jamboree Spur			
Lick Fork Branch			Consists of two railroad segments: Lick Fork Branch Main Line and Lick Fork Branch out of service tracks
Mate Creek Branch			
Alma Branch			
Nolan Spur	Nolan, WV	Hatfield, KY	
Long Fork Spur	Hatfield, KY	Elkins Fork, KY	
Sidney Spur	Hatfield, KY	Sidney, KY	
Lenore Branch	Naugatuck, WV	Ragland, WV	
Marrowbone Branch			
Wolf Creek Branch	Lovely, KY	Prestonsburg, KY	
Wayne Branch			
Colmont Spur			
Dry Fork Branch			
Jacobs Fork Branch			
Coal Creek Branch			
Dumps Creek Branch			
Big Toms Creek Branch			
Buchanan Branch			
Levisa Branch			
Big Creek Branch			
Dismal Creek Branch			
Big Prater Creek Spur			
Garden Creek Branch			
Glamorgan Branch			
Dixiana Branch			
Pardee Branch			
Pine Branch			
Roda Branch			
T-Line			
St. Charles Branch			
Calvin Spur			
Winding Gulf Branch			Former VGA and later N&W line.
Stone Coal Branch			Former VGA and later N&W line.
Glen Rogers Branch			Former VGA and later N&W line.
Vaco Branch			Former VGA and later N&W line.
Guyandot River Branch (or Guyandotte River Branch, formerly known as Guyandot River Line)			Former VGA and later N&W line.
Pinnacle Creek Branch			
Morri Branch			Former VGA and later N&W line.
Cub Creek Branch			Former VGA and later N&W line.
West Virginia Secondary	Columbus, Ohio	Enon, West Virginia	Leased to Watco and operated as Kanawha River Railroad, LLC
New Connection Track			
Norton Wye			
Beech Fork Spur			
Vulcan Middle Track			
Virginia Division Pull-In Track			
Former Virginia Division			
Altavista District	Abilene, Virginia	Roanoke, Virginia	Former VGA line which was passed to the N&W. It assumed its current name under N&W ownership.
	Abilene, Virginia	Crewe, Virginia	
Blue Ridge District (formerly Crewe to Roanoke)	Crewe, Virginia	Roanoke, Virginia	Former N&W line and it was called Crewe to Roanoke (also known as Roanoke to Crewe) and then Blue Ridge District under N&W ownership. The Crewe to Roanoke name was revived as a nickname for the rail line instead. The Blue Ridge District is part of the Lamberts Point to Roanoke rail corridor.
Christiansburg District (or Roanoke to Bluefield and New River District)	Roanoke, Virginia	Bluefield, West Virginia	Former N&W line and it was called Christiansburg District under N&W ownership. It is part of the Roanoke to Bluefield and Bristol rail corridor.
?	Roanoke, Virginia	Walton, Virginia	
Petersburg Belt Line			Former N&W rail line
Durham District	Lynchburg, Virginia	Hyco Lake, North Carolina	Built by the Lynchburg and Durham Railroad, former VGA line which was passed to the N&W. It assumed its current name under N&W ownership.
Hagerstown District	Hagerstown, Maryland	Shenandoah, Virginia	The line is a former N&W property and it was once part of the Shenandoah District, a former N&W line. The Shenandoah District was also known as the Shenandoah Valley Line, Shenandoah Line or Hagerstown to Roanoke.
Norfolk District (formerly Lamberts Point to Crewe)	Norfolk, Virginia	Crewe, Virginia	Former N&W line and it was once part of the Norfolk and Western main line. The line was formerly known as Lamberts Point to Crewe under N&W ownership and was renamed to Norfolk District under N&W ownership The line from Lamberts Point to Canal Drive, Norfolk was separated from the Norfolk District and became a new rail line called Norfolk Terminal. The Norfolk District is part of the Lamberts Point to Roanoke rail corridor. At one time the line's original name was restored as a timetable name and the line was grouped with the Norfolk Terminal in that one timetable.
Pulaski District (or Walton to Bristol)	Walton, Virginia	Bristol, Virginia	Former N&W line and it was called Pulaski District under N&W ownership. It is part of the Roanoke to Bluefield and Bristol rail corridor.
Richmond District (includes Yard Track, Track No. 15 and Woodhole Track)	Burkeville, Virginia	West Point, Virginia	Former Southern Railway) and originally Richmond and York River Railroad and eastern section of Richmond and Danville Railroad
Roanoke District	Shenandoah, Virginia	Roanoke, Virginia	The line is a former N&W property and it was once part of the Shenandoah District, a former N&W line. The Shenandoah District was also known as the Shenandoah Valley Line, Shenandoah Line or Hagerstown to Roanoke.
Whitethorne District	Roanoke, Virginia	Narrows, Virginia	Former N&W line and it was called Whitethorne District under N&W ownership.
Winston-Salem District (or Roanoke to Winston-Salem)	Roanoke, Virginia	Winston-Salem, North Carolina	The line is a former N&W line and assumed its current name under N&W ownership.
Norfolk Terminal (Lamberts Point to Canal Drive)	Norfolk, Virginia	Norfolk, Virginia	The line is a former N&W property and it was once part of the Norfolk and Western main line and then the Norfolk District (formerly Lamberts Point to Crewe). The Norfolk Terminal is part of the Lamberts Point to Roanoke rail corridor.
Sewells Point Branch Grouped with Norfolk Terminal)	Norfolk, Virginia	Norfolk, Virginia	Former N&W line, formerly known as Sewells Point District and it was once part of the defunct Sewells Point to Virso Connection rail corridor.
South Branch (Grouped with Norfolk Terminal, or South Branch Main Line and Old Jarratt District))	Norfolk, Virginia	Norfolk, Virginia	
Jarratt District	Norfolk, Virginia	Norfolk, Virginia	The line was once the primary rail line of the defunct Sewells Point to Virso Connection rail corridor;
Berkley/Albemarle District (Grouped with Norfolk Terminal, formerly Berkley District)	Norfolk, Virginia	Norfolk, Virginia	
Albemarle District (Grouped with Norfolk Terminal)	Norfolk, Virginia	Norfolk, Virginia	
New Berkley Line (Grouped with Norfolk Terminal)	Norfolk, Virginia	Norfolk, Virginia	
Franklin District			
City Point Branch			Former N&W line
Halsey Spur			
Clover Spur			
Mayo Creek Spur			Was grouped with Durham District employee timetable.
Hypo Spur			Was grouped with Durham District employee timetable.
Roanoke Terminal (Vinton to West Roanoke)			Former N&W property
Roanoke Terminal (North Roanoke to Starkey)			Former N&W property
Roanoke Terminal (Demuth to Salem Connection)			Former N&W property
Catawba Branch			
Blacksburg Branch			
Radford Branch			
Bradshaw Spur			
Potts Valley Branch			
Cloverdale Branch			
Chesapeake Western (Elkton to Dayton) (formerly Chesapeake Western (Elkton to Harrisonburg)			
Chesapeake Western (Harrisonburg to Pleasant Valley) (formerly Chesapeake Western (Harrisonburg to Staunton)			It is an Excepted Track
Chesapeake Western (Harrisonburg to Bowman) (formerly Chesapeake Western (Harrisonburg to Mt. Jackson) Consists of Mt. Jackson Line railroad segment.			
George's Old Mill Track			
Hill Top Branch			
Nylon Spur			
Belews Creek Spur			
Walton Storage Track			
Salem Connection Track			
VS Running Track (or Auxiliary Track — Richmond District)			
Webster Storage Track			
Tinker Creek Connection Track			
East & West Legs Wye			
Sewells Point Line (or Main 1, Sewells Point Line or Main 1)			
Fontaine Spur			

== List of defunct lines ==
=== Defunct Norfolk Southern lines or lines that don't have their own employee timetable ===
Sources:

- Bath Secondary- was part of NS Harrisburg Division
- Bethlehem Secondary- was part of NS Harrisburg Division
- Farmer's Valley Secondary- was part of NS Harrisburg Division
- Linden North Wye- was part of NS Harrisburg Division
- Streator Secondary- was part of NS Dearborn Division
- Sterling Secondary- was part of NS Dearborn Division
- Nipsco Secondary- was part of NS Dearborn Division
- Junction Yard Secondary- was part of NS Dearborn Division
- Bo Secondary- was part of NS Dearborn Division
- Harvard Connecting Track- was part of NS Dearborn Division
- Amtrak Connecting Track- was part of NS Dearborn Division
- Buckeye Line- was part of NS Dearborn Division
- Indianapolis District
- Bradford Secondary
- North Yard Branch- was part of NS Dearborn Division
- Cleveland Belt Line (later known as Cleveland Belt - Line Branch)- was part of NS Lake Division
- Cleveland Belt Line Bridge track- was part of NS Lake Division
- Manhattan Branch- was part of NS Lake Division
- Maumee Branch- was part of NS Lake Division
- Toledo Maumee Connection- was part of NS Lake Division
- South Bend Branch- was part of NS Lake Division, former PRR.
- Fort Wayne District- was part of NS Lake Division
- Federal District (or Alton Branch)- became the Alton District rail corridor.
- Franklin Secondary (formerly known as Franklin Secondary Track)- was part of NS Pittsburgh Division
- Harbor Connecting Track- was part of NS Pittsburgh Division
- Harding Connecting Track- was part of NS Pittsburgh Division
- New Castle Connecting Track- was part of NS Pittsburgh Division
- Alliance—Crest District
- Pitt—Wood District
- Alliance Running Track
- South Massillon Branch
- Captina Running Track
- Yellow Creek Runner
- Hugo Industrial Track
- Roanoke Belt Line
- UM Line- portion from Mansfield, IL to Bloomington, IL (Dean) formally abandoned in 2017, was part of NS Illinois Division

=== Defunct Norfolk and Western lines (later Norfolk Southern) ===
- Farmville Belt Line (sometimes pronounced Farmville Beltline, later known as Burkeville–Pamplin Belt Line and Burkeville–Pamplin Low Grade Line)- a former Norfolk and Western rail line, created from the Norfolk and Western main line.
- Wheeling District- a former Norfolk and Western rail line.
- Canton District- a former Norfolk and Western rail line.
- Steubenville Branch- a former Norfolk and Western rail line.
- Chagrin Falls Branch- a former Norfolk and Western rail line.
- Adena Branch- a former Norfolk and Western rail line.
- Carrollton Branch- a former Norfolk and Western rail line.
- Zanesville District- a former Norfolk and Western rail line.
- Akron District- a former Norfolk and Western rail line.
- Connellsville District- a former Norfolk and Western rail line.
- St. Louis Terminal- a former Norfolk and Western rail line.
- Stanberry District- a former Norfolk and Western rail line.
- Council Bluffs District- a former Norfolk and Western rail line.
- Hannibal District- a former Norfolk and Western rail line.
- Moulton District- a former Norfolk and Western rail line.
- Des Moines District- a former Norfolk and Western rail line.
- Luther Branch- a former Norfolk and Western rail line.
- Columbia Branch- a former Norfolk and Western rail line.

=== Defunct Norfolk and Western lines (regular) ===
- Main Line- main line of the Norfolk and Western, the majority of the line is still used, but its now represented as separate rail lines.
  - Lynchburg Belt Line (later known as Main Line (Phoebe to Forest))- a former Norfolk and Western rail line, created from the Norfolk and Western main line.
- Shenandoah District (also known as Shenandoah Valley Line or Shenandoah Line)- a former Norfolk and Western rail line; line is still active, but was separated into two rail lines: Roanoke District and Hagerstown District.
- Kinney to Duke (or Duke to Kinney)- a former Norfolk and Western rail line.
- Radford District- a former Norfolk and Western rail line.
- Saltville Branch- a former Norfolk and Western rail line.
- North Carolina Branch- a former Norfolk and Western rail line.
- Abingdon Branch- a former Norfolk and Western rail line.
- Duke's Belt Line- a former Norfolk and Western rail line.
- Concord—Forest Low Grade Line- a former Norfolk and Western rail line.
- AC&Y District- - a former Norfolk and Western rail line. Built by Akron, Canton and Youngstown Railroad and sold to the new Wheeling and Lake Erie Railway.
- AC&NA Branch- - a former Norfolk and Western rail line.
- Massillon Branch- - a former Norfolk and Western rail line.

=== Defunct Virginian lines (later Norfolk and Western) ===
- Princeton District- a former Virginian Railway rail line which passed down to Norfolk and Western. Formed from the Virginian Railway main line and was combined with Deepwater District to form Princeton–Deepwater District. The Princeton District and Deepwater District rail lines were part of the Kellysville to D.B. Tower rail corridor.
- Deepwater District- a former Virginian Railway rail line which passed down to Norfolk and Western. Formed from the Virginian Railway main line and was combined with Princeton District to form Princeton–Deepwater District. The Deepwater District and Princeton District rail lines were part of the Kellysville to D.B. Tower rail corridor.
- First Subdivision- a former Virginian Railway rail line which passed down to Norfolk and Western. Formed from the Virginian Railway main line.

=== Defunct Virginian lines (regular) ===
- Main Line- a former Virginian Railway rail line.
- Huff Creek Branch- a former Virginian Railway rail line.
- Allen Creek Bridge track- a former Virginian Railway rail line.
- Bowyer Creek Branch- a former Virginian Railway rail line.
- Laurel Fork Branch- a former Virginian Railway rail line.
- White Oak Branch- a former Virginian Railway rail line.
- Beards Fork Branch- a former Virginian Railway rail line.
- Piney Creek Extension and Upper Piney Creek Extension- a former Virginian Railway rail line.
- Eastern Branch- a former Virginian Railway rail line.

=== Defunct Wabash lines (later Norfolk and Western and Norfolk Southern) ===
- Delta District- a former Wabash Railroad rail line which was passed on to Norfolk and Western. Formerly known as Toledo−Montpelier−1st District. Part of the defunct Toledo to Landers rail corridor.
- Gary Branch- a former Wabash Railroad rail line which was passed on to Norfolk and Western. Formerly known as Montpelier−Chicago−4th District and Gary District. Part of the defunct Toledo to Landers rail corridor.
- Maumee District- a former Wabash Railroad rail line which was passed on to Norfolk and Western. Formerly known as Maumee–New Haven–5th District.
- La Porte Spur- a former Wabash Railroad rail line which was passed on to Norfolk and Western.
- 8th District- from Bement, Il southward to Shumway, Il where it split into two branches going to Altamont and Effingham, Il.
- 11th District- from Meredosia, IL to Keokuk, IA
- Streator Branch - Streator to Forrest, IL
- Pittsfield Branch- Pittsfield to Maysville, IL
- Quincy Branch - East Hannibal to Quincy, IL
- Champaign Branch- Champaign to Deers, IL

=== Defunct Wabash lines (regular) ===
- Peru–Tilton–2nd District- a former Wabash Railroad rail line
- Chicago to Forest–6th District (or Forest to Chicago–6th District)- a former Wabash Railroad rail line. Metra operates this line from Landers Yard to Manhattan, IL. Track removed south of Manhattan.
- Forest to Bement–7th District (or Forest to Chicago–6th District)- a former Wabash Railroad rail line. Portion from Gibson City, IL to Risk sold to BLOL.
- Streator Branch–7th District (or Streator Branch)- a former Wabash Railroad rail line
- Bement to Effingham- 8th District- a former Wabash Railroad rail line
- Tilton to Decatur–9th District (or Decatur to Tilton–9th District)- a former Wabash Railroad rail line
- Decatur to St.Louis–13th District (or St.Louis to Decatur–13th District)- a former Wabash Railroad rail line
- Decatur–Outer Depot–10th District- a former Wabash Railroad rail line
- Keokuk Branch–11th District (or Keokuk Branch)- a former Wabash Railroad rail line
- Outer Depot-Moberly-12th District

=== Defunct Central of Georgia lines ===
- Convington District- a former Central of Georgia rail line
- Athens District- a former Central of Georgia rail line.
- Oconee District- a former Central of Georgia rail line.
- Americus District- a former Central of Georgia rail line.
- Andalusia District- a former Central of Georgia rail line.
- Birmingham District- a former Central of Georgia rail line.
- Chattanooga District- a former Central of Georgia rail line.
- Greenville District (not related to the current NS Greenville District)- a former Central of Georgia rail line.
- Roanoke District (not related to the current NS Roanoke District)- a former Central of Georgia rail line.
- Dadeville Loop- a former Central of Georgia rail line.

== Misc. ==
=== Examples of extra trackage not owned by Norfolk Southern (only some are included) ===
- Chemical Lime Lead- Alabama Division
- Georgia Pacific Lead- Alabama Division
- International Paper Lead- Alabama Division
- Gulf States Paper Lead- Alabama Division
- Segco Mine Tracks- Alabama Division
- Nauvoo Coal Track- Alabama Division
- Jasper Lumber Company Spur- Alabama Division
- Canadian National Railway State Docks Lead- Alabama Division
- Kroger Leads- Georgia Division
- Stevens Graphics Track- Georgia Division
- Arch Chemical Track- Georgia Division
- Rayonier Lead- Georgia Division
- Seaboard Construction Industrial Track- Georgia Division
- General Electric Hydro Switch- Georgia Division
- Boyle Midway Upper Track- Georgia Division
- General Electric Lead- Georgia Division
- Huber Lead- Georgia Division
- Chattahoochee Industrial Railroad CIRR Lead Hilton- Georgia Division
- Harlee Lead- Georgia Division, defunct
- ECOLAB Track- Georgia Division
- GA Power Loop Track- Georgia Division

=== Not sure ===
- AAR Connection Track at Prillaman Chemical Company- Alabama Division
- Vulcan Lead- Alabama Division
- Crystex Track- Alabama Division
- Stone Mountain Lead- Alabama Division and Georgia Division
- Stone Mountain Industrial Area and Stone Mountain Industrial Lead- Alabama Division and Georgia Division
- L.B. Foster Track- Alabama Division and Georgia Division
- Decatur Street Belt Line- Alabama Division and Georgia Division

== See also ==
- List of CSX Transportation lines
- High Point, Thomasville and Denton Railroad
- Georgia Southern and Florida Railway- GS&F Main Line (or GS&F Main Track and GS&F District Main Track), Norfolk Southern Georgia Division
