= Salisbury Wye =

North Carolina railroading landmark

The Salisbury Wye is a Y-shaped railroad junction in Salisbury, North Carolina, operated through Norfolk Southern Railway's Coastal Division. The Charlotte District, which is the main line with intermodal, manifest and Amtrak trains daily, connects to the Asheville branch which hosts manifest, local and coal trains daily.

== Trains ==
All manifest trains travel to and from nearby Linwood Yard and it is an official stop for new crews. However, eastbound trains who are bound for Columbia, South Carolina, will stop at nearby Fulton St. in Salisbury and change crew and the train will hit the Charlotte District, and then as soon as they pass the Queen City they hit the Columbia District onto the R-Line and head south.

Salisbury is 45 minutes north of Charlotte.

== Railfans ==
The Salisbury Wye is also an attraction to railfans; weekends can sometimes be a day that many railfans would come and take photographs and videos of the trains as they pass through. Another nearby spot for railfans north of Salisbury in Spencer, North Carolina, is the former Hackett St. railroad crossing at Five Row. It is a spot where railfans watch south- or westbound trains go up a hill to the Five Row signal after crossing the Yadkin River and northbound trains going down the hill. It is located just 2 minutes away from the North Carolina Transportation Museum.
