= Cincinnati District =

Railroad line in Ohio, U.S.

Overview
- Status: Active (Clare Yard to Peebles); Inactive (Peebles to Vera Junction)
- Owner: Norfolk Southern
- Locale: Southern Ohio
- Termini: Clare Yard in Mariemont, Ohio; Vera Junction in Portsmouth, Ohio

Service
- Type: Freight rail
- Operator(s): Cincinnati, Batavia and Williamsburg Railroad (1876–1887); Ohio and Northwestern Railroad (1887–1890); Cincinnati, Portsmouth and Virginia Railroad (1891–1901); Norfolk and Western Railway (1901–1982); Norfolk Southern Railway (1982–2014); Cincinnati Eastern Railroad (2014–present)

History
- Opened: 1876 (150 years ago) to present

Technical
- Line length: 96.20 mi (154.8 km)
- Number of tracks: 1 passing sidings: 12 (8 active)
- Track gauge: Current: 4 ft 8 1/2 in (1,435 mm) standard gauge Original: 3 ft (914 mm)

The Cincinnati District is a railroad line owned by the Norfolk Southern Railway and operated by Cincinnati Eastern Railroad in the U.S. state of Ohio. The line runs from Cincinnati, Ohio, southeast to Portsmouth, Ohio, along a former Norfolk and Western Railway line. Its southeast end is at the Columbus District near Portsmouth, while its northwest end is in Mariemont, Ohio, where it meets the Indiana and Ohio Railway's Midland Subdivision and Norfolk Southern's Dayton District.

== Pre-1900 history ==
Connecting the cities of Cincinnati and Williamsburg, the Cincinnati, Batavia & Williamsburg Railway (CB&W) was chartered on January 11, 1876. The name was changed to the Cincinnati & Eastern Railroad (C&E) and the eastern terminus was changed to Portsmouth by May. The main reason behind building the C&E is that it was projected to become a primary coal-hauling route from the Jackson County coalfields. Construction began almost immediately on the C&E and by October 18, 1876, the route was open for 15 miles (24 km) between Batavia Junction and Batavia. By August 4, 1877, the line had reached Winchester, a distance of 48 miles (77 km). The C&E opened five miles (8.0 km) of a branch towards New Richmond from the Cincinnati, Georgetown & Portsmouth Railway at Richmond Junction to Tobasco on March 1, 1878.

A 5.5-mile (8.9 km) western extension of the C&E to the Miami Valley Railroad (MV) was completed in June. The MV had proposed a narrow-gauge connection to Cincinnati via a tunnel through the Deer Creek valley, but after the Deer Creek tunnel project ran into financial difficulties, the C&E found that its connection to Cincinnati was useless thereby forcing the carrier to enter into bankruptcy on January 27, 1879. Nonetheless, the New Richmond branch was extended to Blairsville by early 1880 and to New Richmond on March 1, a distance of 14 miles (23 km). Excited by the prospects of connecting the C&E with the vast coal reserves of the southern part of the state, shareholders voted to increase the capital stock from $500,000 to $2 million and authorized a bond issue to finish the railroad from Winchester to Portsmouth, and to then build an extension to Gallipolis on November 21, 1880.

The C&E exited receivership on March 1, 1881. In February 1882, the railroad signed an agreement with the Cincinnati Northern to use 3.8 miles (6.1 km) of its line between Idlewild and Court Street via the Deer Creek valley to provide the C&E with a direct connection to its Court Street depot in downtown Cincinnati. The C&E began operations with daily runs to Irvington, Winchester, and New Richmond from Court Street on April 4, 1882. The C&E mainline had been finished to Peebles by the close of the year, to Rarden by May 1883, and to the Scioto Valley Railway at Vera Junction just north of Portsmouth in August 1884, which included the erection of a 1,000-foot crossing of the Scioto River. The high expense of the bridge and building an alignment through the Scioto Brush Creek valley caused the C&E to enter bankruptcy again on September 14.

The C&E began preparation to convert its route from narrow-gauge to standard-gauge shortly after the completion of its railroad to Portsmouth. However, by February 1885, its finances had not improved and another receiver was appointed for the railroad. The C&E east of Winchester to Vera Junction had been converted to standard gauge by May, but no money had been appropriated for standard gauge cars. A court authorized receiver approved the expenditure of $180,000 to convert the line west of Winchester to standard gauge, but the collapse of the 800-foot Nineveh trestle on the New Richmond branch on August 8 scuttled those plans. The disaster greatly aggravated the railroad's financial issues and another receiver was appointed who felt it was necessary to reconvert the standard gauge from Winchester to Portsmouth back to narrow gauge in order for the line to generate a profit.

By early 1886, the C&E was once again narrow gauge. The railroad was sold to a representative of the Cincinnati, Hamilton & Dayton (CH&D) on September 1, however, it defaulted on payments and the railroad was resold on January 5, 1887, to H.B. Morehead who formed the Ohio & Northwestern Railroad (O&NW). Separately, the New Richmond branch was sold to William P. DeVou on September 1, 1886, who reorganized it as the Cincinnati, New Richmond & Ohio River Railroad (CNR&OR). DeVou planned to extend the CNR&OR east to Aberdeen but the line had ceased operations by July 1889.

The O&NW moved immediately to standard gauge the ex-C&E mainline between Cincinnati to Portsmouth which was completed by November 1887. The O&NW then shifted its western terminus from the Cincinnati Northern depot to the Little Miami Railroad depot. Like its predecessors, the O&NW became insolvent and went into receivership on June 15, 1888. Under receivership, the O&NW completed five miles (8.0 km) of its long-awaited Gallipolis extension between Portsmouth and Sciotoville in February 1889. The O&NW was sold on March 13, 1890, and reorganized as the Cincinnati, Portsmouth & Virginia Railroad (CP&V) on June 24, 1891.The Norfolk and Western Railway merged with the CP&V in October 1901, and the Cincinnati to Portsmouth segment becoming the N&W Cincinnati Division with the nickname of the Peavine.

== Subsequent history to current day ==
The Scioto River crossing at Vera Junction was replaced with new multi-span truss bridges fabricated by the American Bridge Company in 1913. The mainline between was realigned in 1947 when a quarry opened along Plum Run required the line to be rerouted, which included the erection of a new trestle above Cedar Fork and the laying of several miles (km) of new track. The quarry became the primary source of ballast for the N&W and added a significant amount of traffic to the Portsmouth Branch until the mid-1980s. By the early 2000s, the bridge at Vera Junction had deteriorated and required expensive repairs, so, Norfolk Southern railbanked the Peavine between Peebles and Vera Junction in 2003. On March 21, 2014, the CCET, a subsidiary of Frontier Rail operating under the trade name Cincinnati East Terminal Railway (CCET) filed with the Surface Transportation Board (STB) to lease and operate the Portsmouth Branch between Clare (Mariemont) and Williamsburg. CCET took over operations on April 27.

In late 2016, the CCET renamed itself the Cincinnati Eastern Railroad and filed with the STB to lease and operate more of the Portsmouth Branch between Williamsburg and Plum Run east of Peebles for the storage of cars. The railroad filed with the STB to extend the lease with the goal of restarting railroad operations at the Plum Run quarry in 2019. Regional Rail, LLC acquired the Cincinnati Eastern Railroad in 2024.
