= SB Line =

SB Line has the following meanings:

- SB Line (Norfolk Southern), a rail line in South Carolina, United States
- San Bernardino Line, a rail line in California, United States
- Nike Skateboarding, a shoe line
