= L-Line (Norfolk Southern) =

The L-Line is a rail line that runs from Winston-Salem, North Carolina to Mooresville, North Carolina and it is owned and operated by the Norfolk Southern Railway; the line is part of the Coastal Division. The line crosses the S-Line at Barber, North Carolina, where most trains are based out of. The line's end point at Mooresville is joined with the O-Line which runs from Mooresville to Charlotte, North Carolina.

The majority of the trains on the L-Line are locals, running trains as far north as Clemmons, but other trains can use this line if needed. The line was very rarely used between Clemmons and Winston-Salem and was still listed as fully operational on its website until recently. However it is disconnected from the K-Line at milepost zero. The Peters Creek Trestle in Winston-Salem was the catalyst for shuddering this section. As of 2020 it has not been repaired and there are no current plans to do so, but the track is still in place.

== See also ==
List of Norfolk Southern Railway lines

S-Line (Norfolk Southern)
