= R Train =

R Train may refer to:

- R (New York City Subway service)
- R-Line (Norfolk Southern), a secondary railway line between Charlotte, North Carolina, and Columbia, South Carolina
- MTR Hyundai Rotem EMU in MTR, Hong Kong
