= Columbus Line Subdivision =

Railroad line in Ohio, U.S.

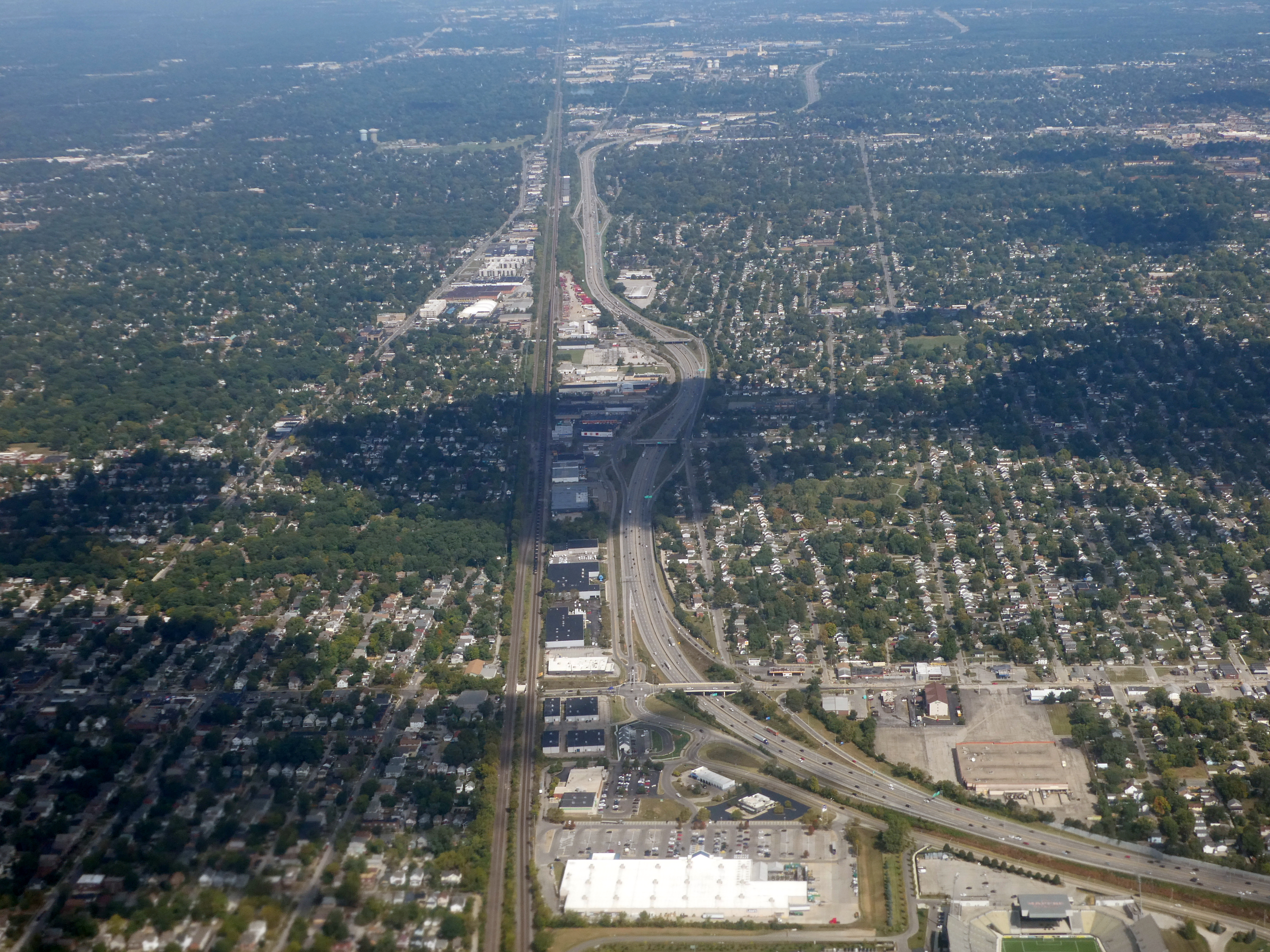
The Columbus Line Subdivision, the north end of the Dayton District, and the Sandusky District paralleling Interstate 71 through northeast Columbus

The Columbus Line Subdivision is a railroad line owned by CSX Transportation in the U.S. state of Ohio. The line runs from Galion south to Columbus along a former New York Central Railroad line.

At its north end, the Columbus Line Subdivision meets the Greenwich Subdivision (northeast towards Cleveland) and the Mount Victory Subdivision (west towards Indianapolis). At its south end, it connects with the Columbus Subdivision (north towards Toledo and south towards Kentucky) and the Western Branch (northwest towards Toledo).

Trains that run on the Columbus Line Subdivision as of July 2019 are Q634 Columbus to Selkirk, Q635 Selkirk to Columbus, Y222 Columbus to Worthington, and D756 Crestline to Columbus (Turn). A few grain trains run on this line as well.

== History ==
The line was opened by the Cleveland, Columbus and Cincinnati Railroad in 1851. In 1853, the Bellefontaine and Indiana Railroad opened from Galion west into Indiana, making Galion the junction that it still is. The line passed through mergers and takeovers into Conrail, and was assigned to CSX in Conrail's 1999 breakup.
