= Charlotte District =

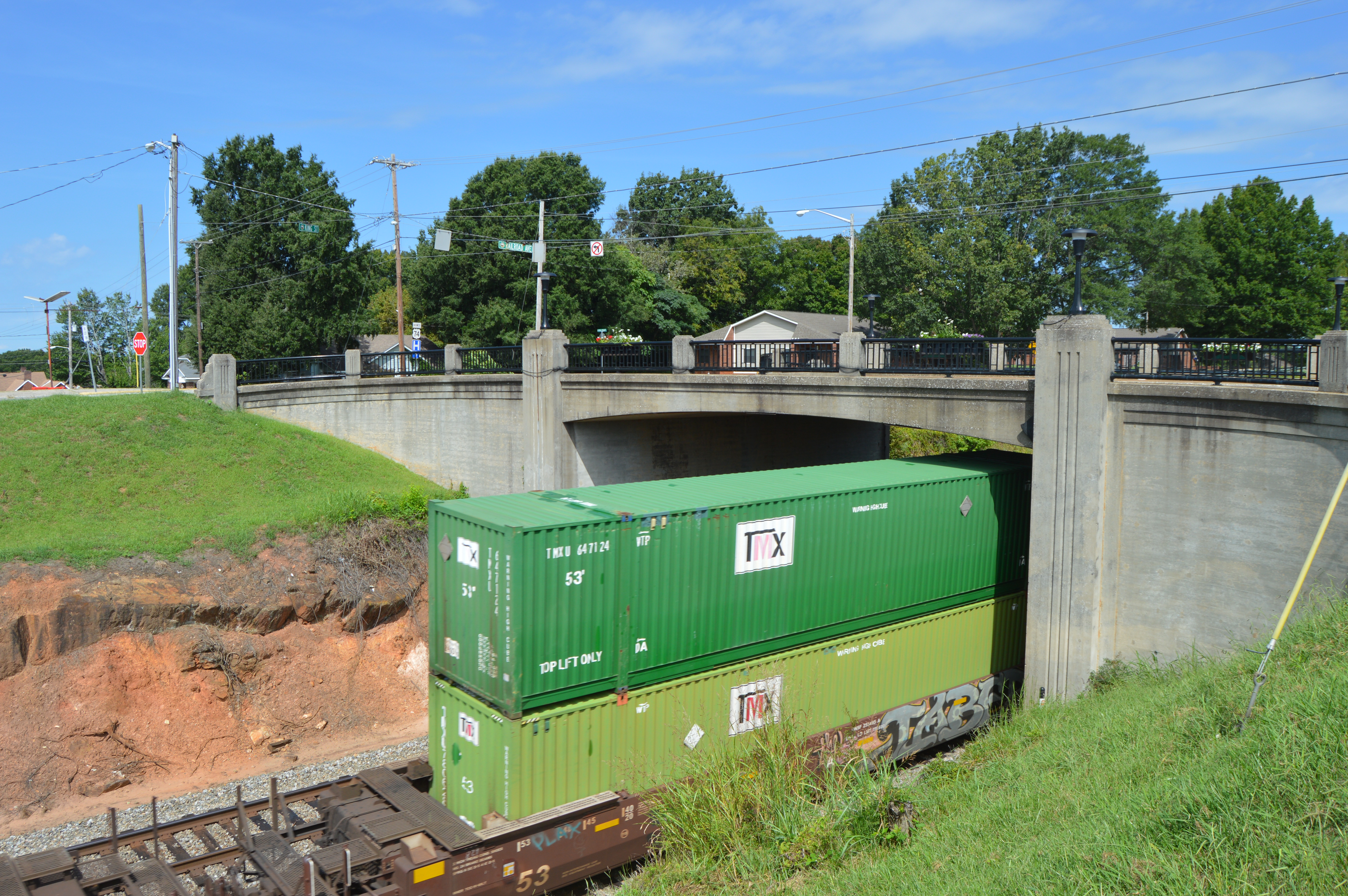
A container train on the Charlotte District passes under the King Street Overhead Bridge in Kings Mountain.

The Charlotte District is a line operated by Norfolk Southern Railway. The line is part of the Norfolk Southern Coastal Division; the district runs between Greenville, South Carolina, and Linwood, North Carolina.

== Trains ==
Intermodal, manifest, coal trains, and Amtrak run on the Charlotte District. 20–30 trains a day run through Charlotte, North Carolina, while between C.P. Charlotte Junction (a connector to the R-Line) and Gaffney, South Carolina, it is usually 10–18 trains a day. Most regional trains do not need track authorities from the Charlotte dispatcher; however, they are given to track supervisors, signal maintainers, locals, or trains that need to do the switching.

== See also ==
- List of Norfolk Southern Railway lines
