= Trenton Cutoff =

Railroad freight line in Pennsylvania

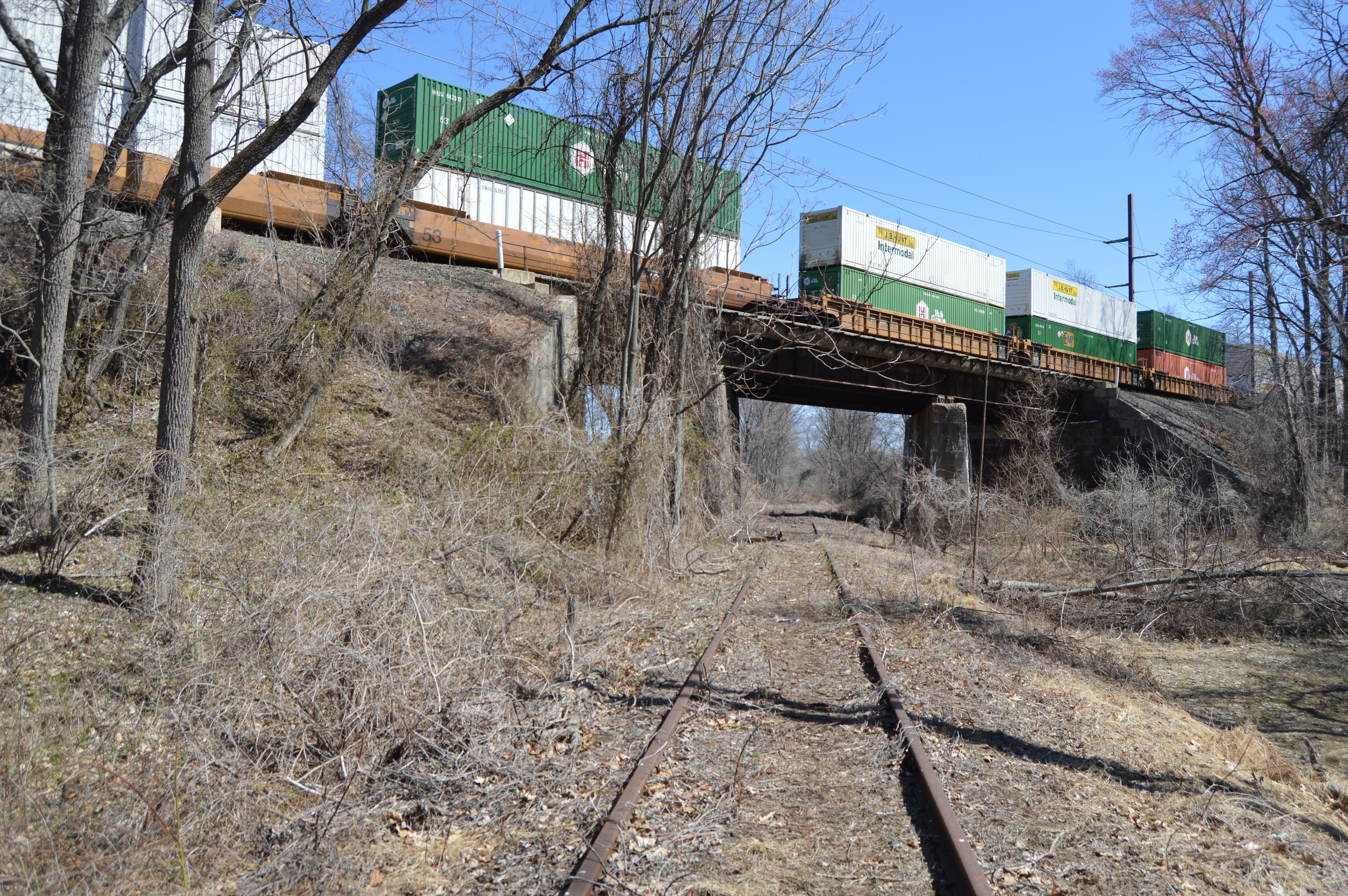
- A Norfolk Southern intermodal freight train on the Trenton Cutoff passes over SEPTA's dormant Fox Chase/Newtown Line in 2015

Overview
- Status: Operational
- Owner: Norfolk Southern
- Locale: Southeastern Pennsylvania
- Termini: Morrisville; Glenloch

Service
- Type: Freight rail
- System: Norfolk Southern
- Operator(s): Norfolk Southern

History
- Opened: 1892

Technical
- Number of tracks: 1
- Track gauge: 1,435 mm (4 ft 8 1/2 in) standard gauge

The Trenton Cutoff (sometimes spelled Trenton Cut Off) is a 48-mile (77 km) rail corridor in the U.S. state of Pennsylvania that runs from Morrisville to Glenloch. Today used by Norfolk Southern, it consists of two rail lines: the Morrisville Line, which runs between Morrisville and Ernest (near Norristown), and the Dale Secondary between Ernest and Glenloch.

The corridor was opened by the Pennsylvania Railroad in 1892 to allow main line freight traffic to run between New York City and Harrisburg without passing through Philadelphia. The Trenton Cutoff goes through the suburbs north and west of the city. The second track (the original westbound track) was removed by Conrail around 1992.

A low-grade line (one with very gradual rises and descents), the Trenton Cutoff runs from Conrail Shared Assets Operations' Morrisville Yard on the Northeast Corridor to GLEN interlocking where it joins the Amtrak-owned Keystone Corridor (Philadelphia to Harrisburg Main Line). Between Morrisville and Ernest, the Trenton Cutoff has active freight service. At Ernest, the Trenton Cutoff connects with the SEPTA Manayunk/Norristown Line (former Reading Railroad), with a connection to Norfolk Southern's Harrisburg Line via a bridge over the Schuylkill River west of the Norristown Transportation Center. From Ernest west to GLEN interlocking, the Trenton Cutoff is a single track in dark (unsignaled) territory. As of 2014, it sees one freight per day, carrying Cleveland-Cliffs steel from Coatesville to Conshohocken.

Originally a two-tracked electrified rail line, the catenary wire over the tracks was dismantled by Conrail to provide greater overhead clearance for double-stack container trains. The high voltage transmission lines running along the Trenton Cutoff from Norristown, where the Trenton Cutoff crosses over the abandoned Pennsylvania Railroad Schuylkill Branch, to Glenloch are part of Amtrak's 25 Hz traction power system, used to power trains on the Northeast Corridor and the Keystone Corridor. For the most part, the line is grade-separated, except for two public grade crossings at Bustleton Pike and County Line Road and a private grade crossing in Fort Washington. The line closely parallels the Pennsylvania Turnpike through Montgomery County. One of PECO's power lines follows the line from Willow Grove to Langhorne.

== See also ==
- List of Norfolk Southern Railway lines
