= Sandusky District =

Railroad line in Ohio, USA

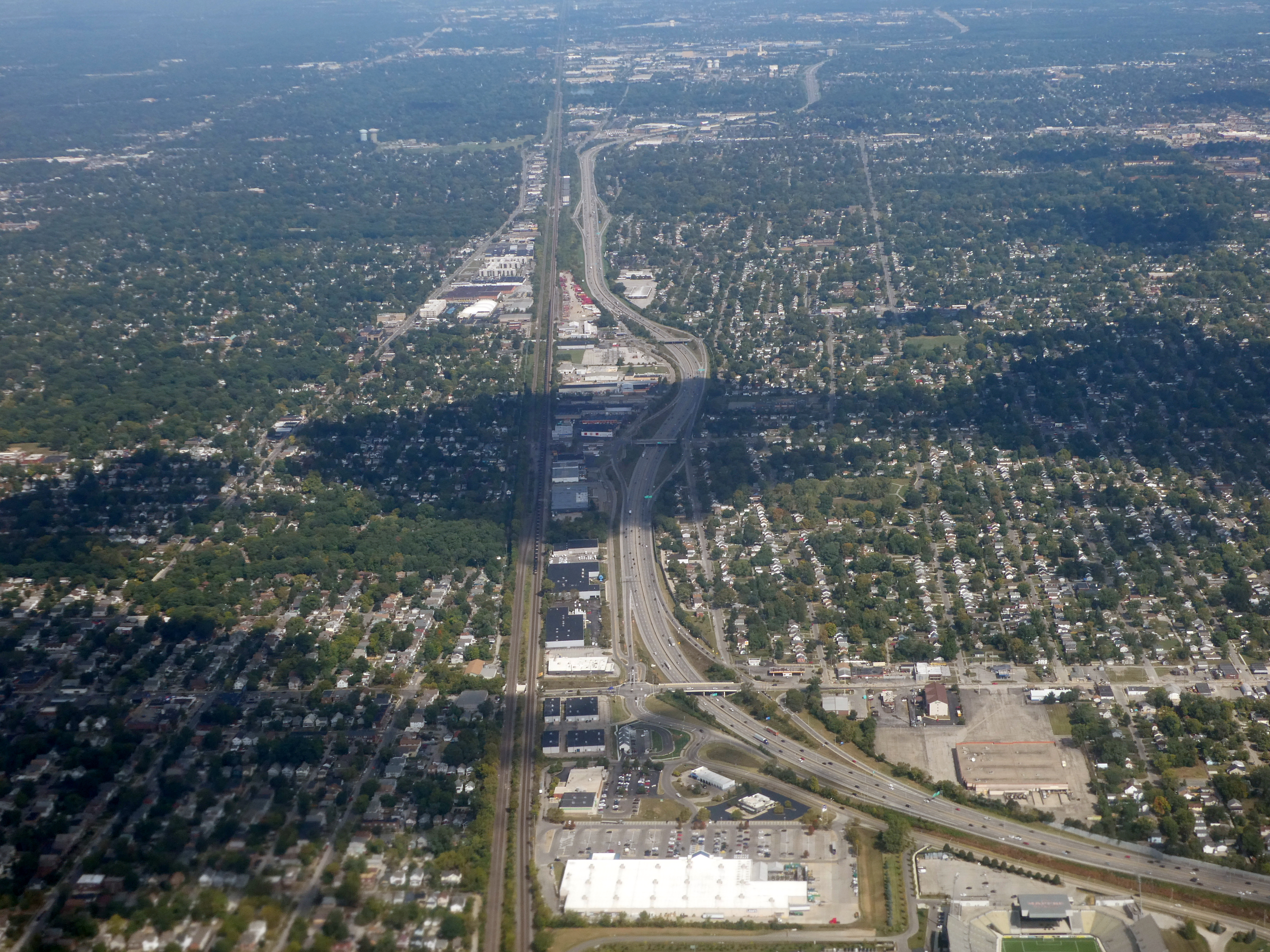
The Columbus Line Subdivision, the north end of the Dayton District, and the Sandusky District paralleling Interstate 71 through northeast Columbus

The Sandusky District is a railroad line owned and operated by the Norfolk Southern Railway in the U.S. state of Ohio. The line runs from Columbus north to Sandusky along a former Pennsylvania Railroad line. At its south end, it junctions or comes close to the Columbus District, Dayton District, and West Virginia Secondary. On the way to the Chicago Line at Sandusky, it meets the Chicago Fort Wayne and Eastern Railroad (along which it has trackage rights) at Bucyrus and the Fostoria District and Cleveland District at Bellevue.

== History ==
The Sandusky and Columbus Short Line Railway opened the line in 1893, and it became part of the Pennsylvania Railroad system through leases and mergers. In 1964, the Norfolk and Western Railway merged the New York, Chicago and St. Louis Railroad (Nickel Plate) and leased the Wabash Railroad and Pittsburgh and West Virginia Railway; they bought the Columbus-Sandusky line from the PRR in order to connect their acquisitions. The former N&W is now part of Norfolk Southern.
