= Columbus Subdivision =

Freight railroad line in Ohio, US

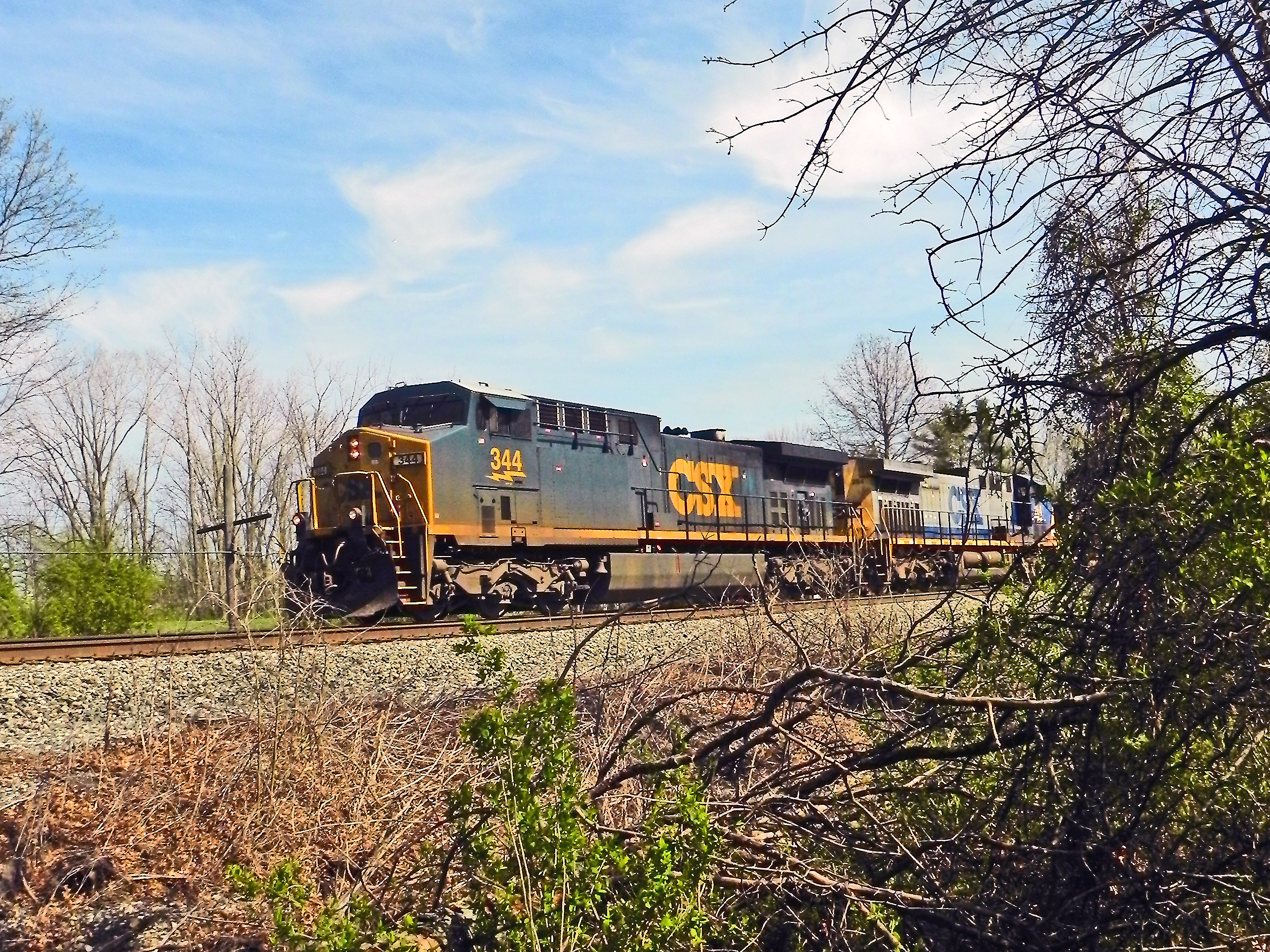
- Northbound train on Columbus Subdivision at Powell

Overview
- Status: Operating
- Owner: CSX Transportation
- Locale: Central to Northern Ohio
- Termini: Columbus, Ohio; Fostoria, Ohio

Service
- Type: Freight rail
- System: CSX Transportation
- Operator(s): CSX Transportation

Technical
- Line length: 127 mi (204 km)
- Track gauge: 1,435 mm (4 ft 8 1/2 in) standard gauge

The Columbus Subdivision is a freight railroad line extending from Columbus, Ohio, north to Fostoria, Ohio. The line is currently owned by CSX Transportation.

This rail line is a mostly double-tracked route that sees a relatively high amount of traffic per day. Unit coal trains are very common on the Columbus Subdivision, but a large variety of commodities travel along the line. The line is controlled via a Centralized Traffic Control system that allows for a high throughput of trains. Direct Traffic Control is also used along the subdivision to separate trains, with a large number of DTC Blocks named after nearby municipalities.

The Columbus Subdivision should not be confused with CSX's Columbus Line Subdivision, which stretches from Columbus, Ohio, to Galion, Ohio, and is located several miles east of the Columbus Subdivision.

== History ==
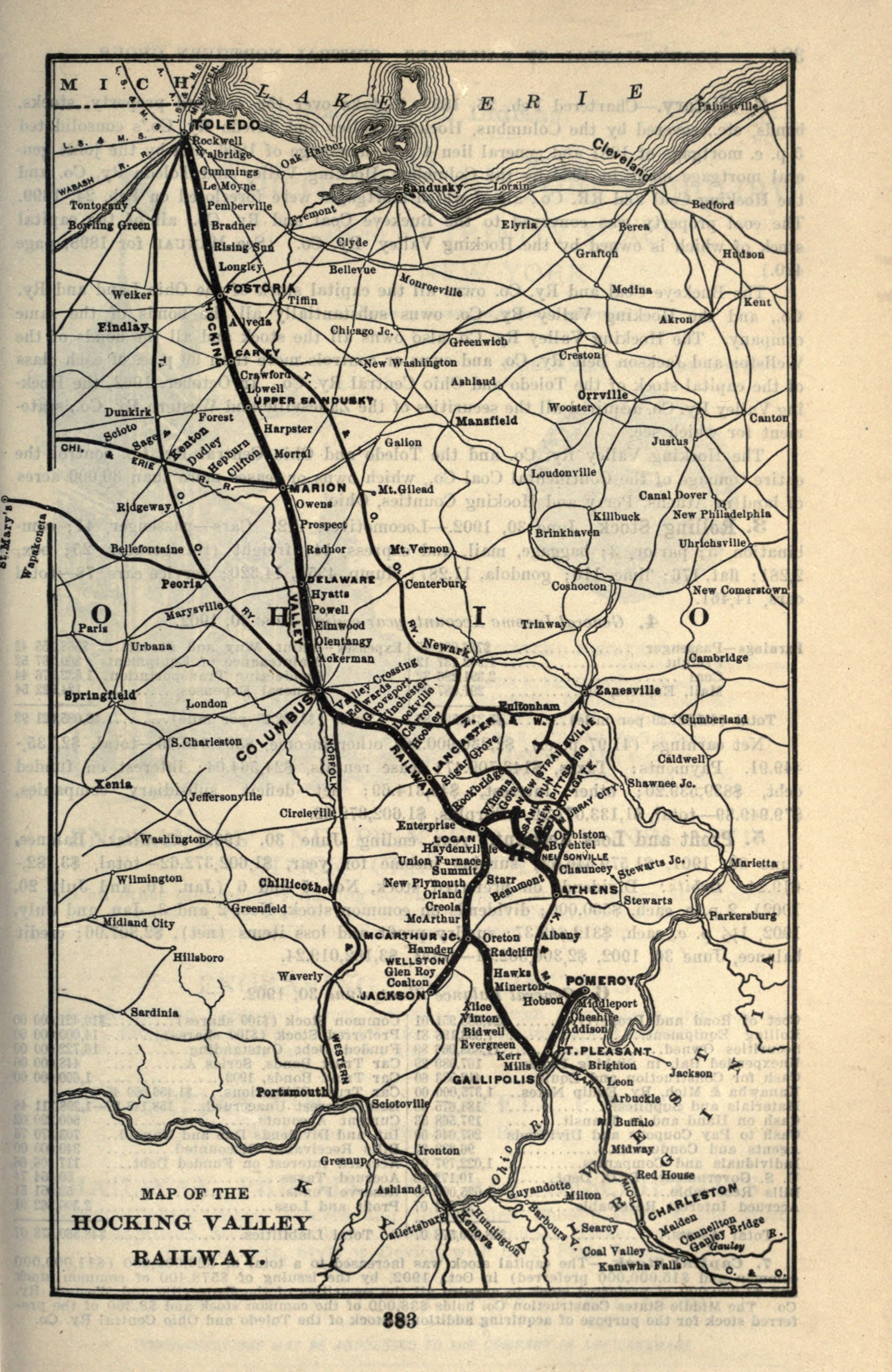
A 1903 track map of the Hocking Valley Railway system

The right-of-way that it known today as the Columbus Subdivision began construction in August 1875, once the newly founded Columbus & Toledo Railroad company raised enough funds to construct a rail line from Columbus north to Toledo through the villages of Linworth, Powell, Delaware, Prospect, Morral, and Fostoria. The primary purpose of the line was to forward coal from the Appalachian region to markets beyond Columbus. Nonetheless, the line also carried passenger traffic and reported 25M passenger-miles and 2.6B freight ton-miles per year. The Columbus & Toledo was later consolidated into the Hocking Valley Railway, along with another connected route extending south of Columbus.

After the Hocking Valley system was acquired by the Chesapeake and Ohio Railway, the line was under C&O ownership. During the 1950s, the track was modernized to include CTC signals and remote dispatch capability. Facilities for Diesel Locomotives were instituted while aging steam equipment was removed and scrapped. Passenger traffic also began to dwindle as personal automobiles and Interstate Highways proliferated, forcing the railroad to focus more on freight movements and remove most small, local depots from service.

In 1980, the C&O's holding company, the Chessie System, and several other railroads merged into the CSX Corporation. In the mid-1980s, CSX established CSX Transportation, which brought all owned lines into a single railroad with the modern-day CSX livery.

In 2006, CSX split the Columbus Subdivision at Fostoria, Ohio. The southern, Columbus–Fostoria portion kept its name, while the northern track towards Toledo was renamed the Pemberville Subdivision and placed into CSX's Great Lakes operating division. Additionally, the track within the high-volume city of Fostoria was renamed the Fostoria Subdivision.
