= Northern Subdivision =

Northern Subdivision may refer to:

- Northern Subdivision (Pennsylvania), formerly B&O
- Northern Subdivision (CSX), formerly C&O, connecting Kentucky to Columbus, Ohio
