= S-Line (Norfolk Southern) =

The Norfolk Southern S-Line is a secondary railroad line which runs between Morristown, Tennessee and Salisbury, North Carolina.

It is operated by Norfolk Southern Railway under 2 divisions. Half of the line is within the Coastal Division and the other half is in the Central Division.

On May 8, 2020, Linwood Yard in Spencer, NC will be idling its hump and rerouting all terminating/originating trains to the surrounding yards in the area. Due to this, the S-Line will no longer feature any through trains (trains running through the entirety of the line. The line will, however, still feature all locals from before with either extended or additional routes.

== Trains ==
All trains are required to be given track authorities from the Asheville Dispatcher.

| Train number | From-To | Frequency |
|---|---|---|
| 135 | Asheville-Knoxville | Monday, Wednesday, Saturday, 2 am |
| 136 | Knoxville-Asheville | Sunday, Tuesday, Friday |
| 744 | Salisbury-Catawba | As needed |
| 745 | Catawba-Salisbury | |
| 51x | Linwood NC-Lehigh IL | As needed |

=== Local trains ===
| Train number | From-To | Notes | Frequency |
|---|---|---|---|
| P71 | Oyama-Old Fort | Turn | Mon-Fri |
| P95 | Oyama-Catawba | Turn | Mon-Fri |
| P60 | Oyama to Linwood | | Sun-Friday |
| P61 | Barber-Linwood | | Daily |
| P62 | Barber-Statesville | | Sun-Thur |
| P87 | Asheville-Bridgewater | | Mon-Fri |
| T-28 | Morristown, TN to Leadvale, TN | | Mon-Fri |
| T-29 | Morristown, TN to Newport, TN | | Sun-Thur |

== See also ==
- List of Norfolk Southern Railway lines
