= New Jersey, Indiana and Illinois Railroad =

American railway in service from 1905 to 1990s

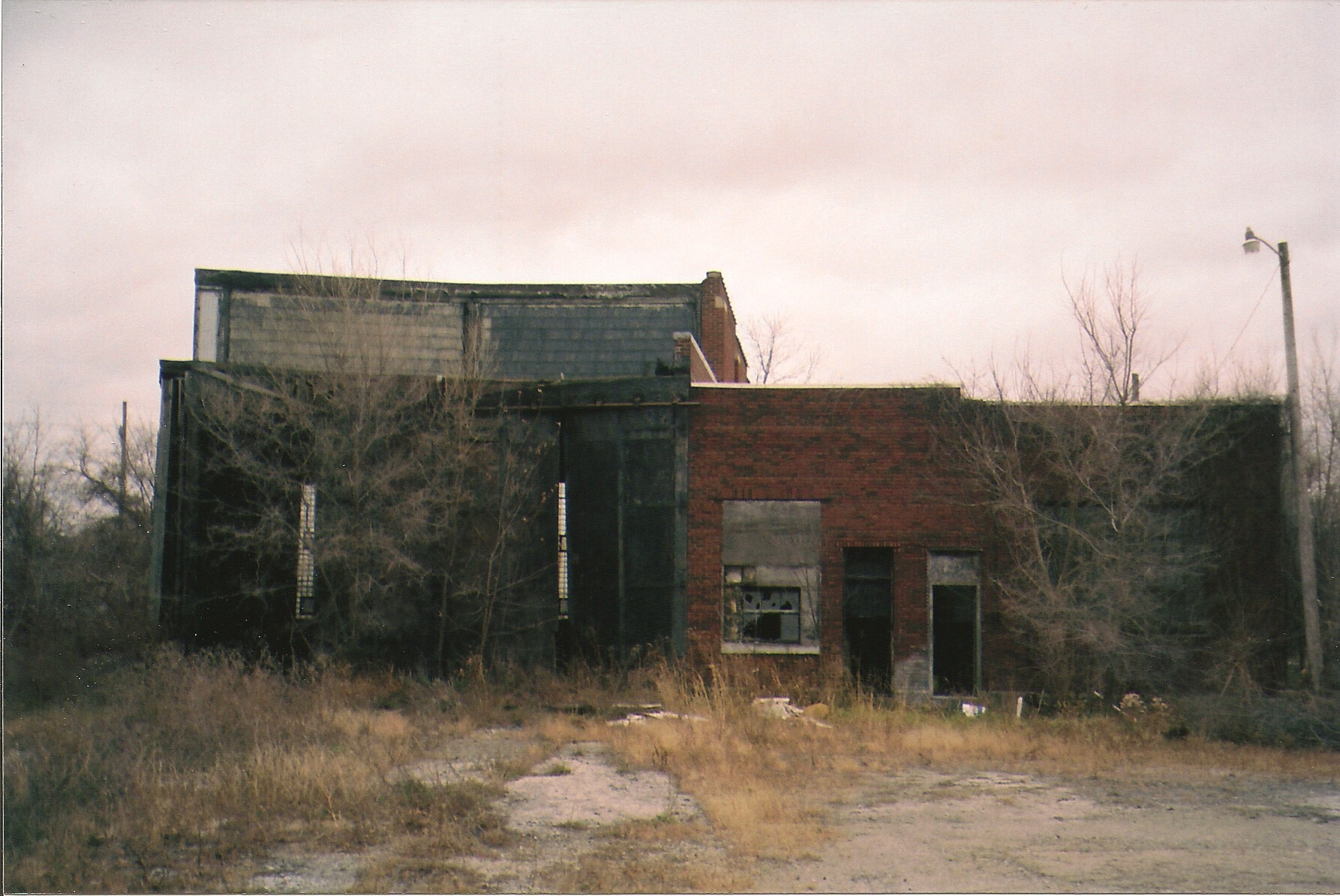
Tom Burke Photo South Bend Former Shortline New Jersey, Indiana, & Illinois (NJI&I) Roundhouse Olive Near Calvert Nov. 23 2012

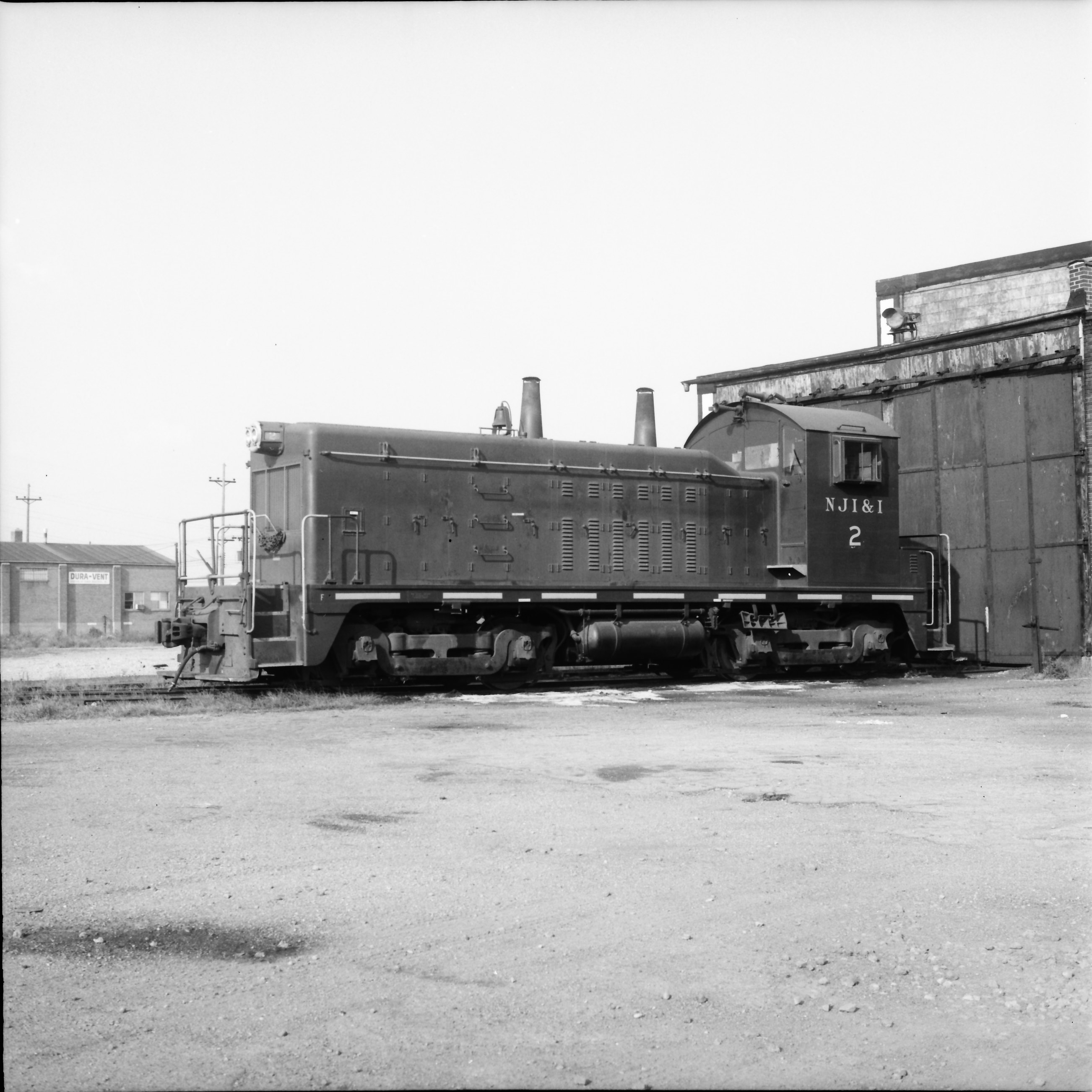

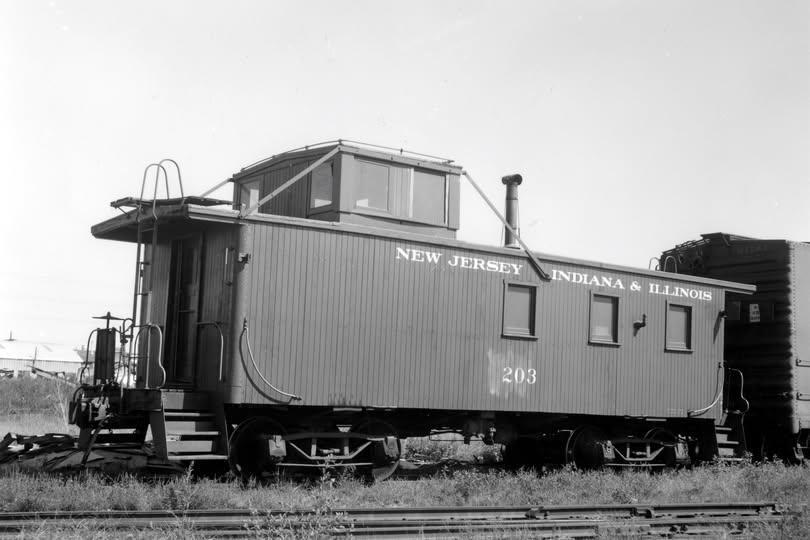
NJI&I Caboose-L. G. Isaac Photo-Chuck Geletzke Collection-Olive Street South Bend IN

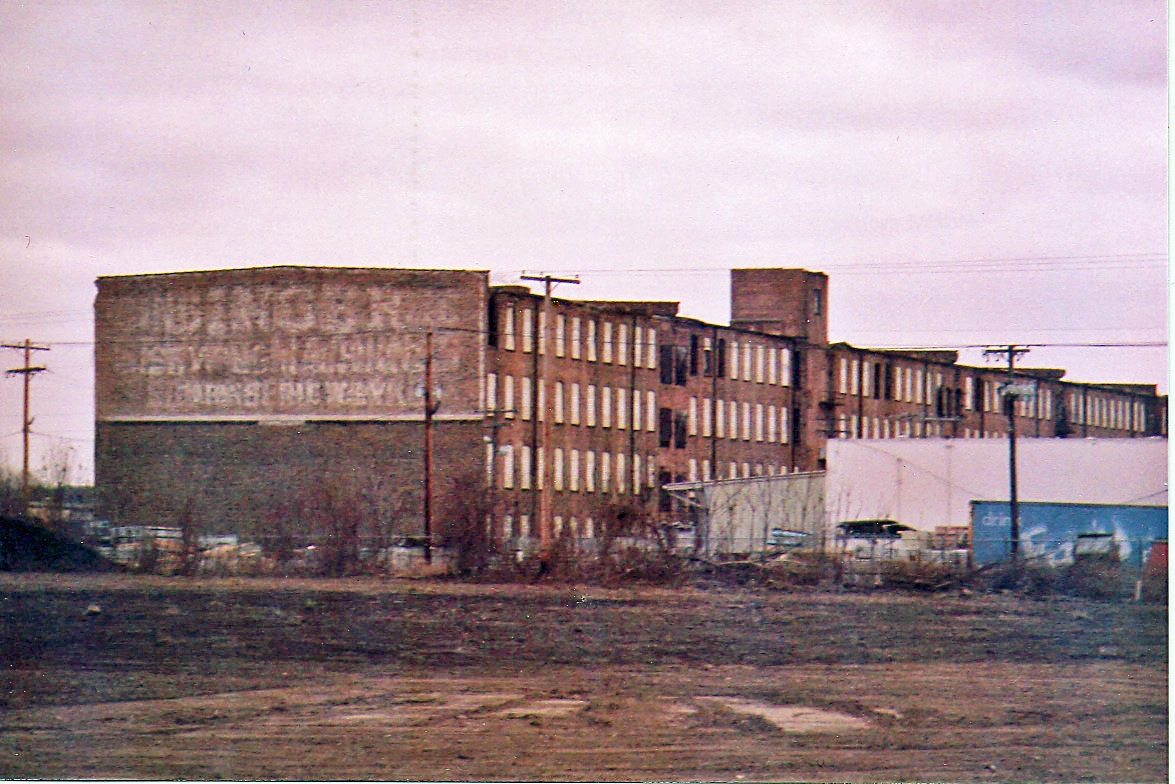

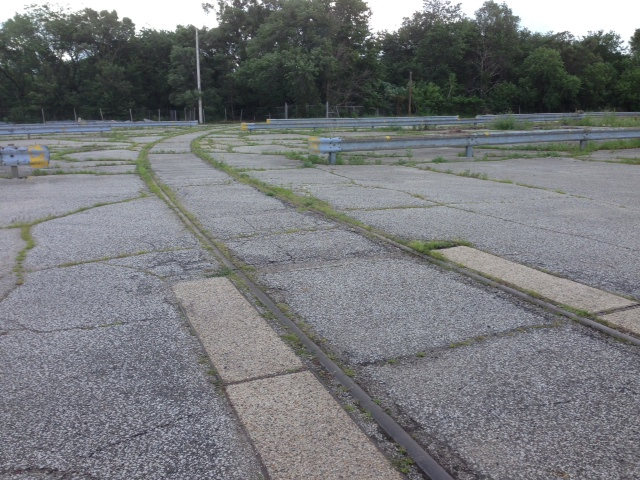

The NJI&I was originally created by the Singer Sewing Machine Company in order to transport their products from South Bend, Indiana, to a connection with the Wabash Railroad in Pine, Indiana. The line began service in 1905 and officially operated on only 11.4 miles of track.

Up until and through World War I the line offered two passenger trains round trip daily to Detroit. In the 1930s passenger service was discontinued. The Wabash had purchased the line in 1926 but continued to operate it as a separate railroad.

The major customers included Singer Manufacturing and the Studebaker Corporation. The NJI&I continued in service until 1982 when the Norfork Southern absorbed the line.

Studebaker shut down its South Bend assembly plant in December 1963, and its engine foundry in 1964, consolidating auto production at its Hamilton, ON, plant until Studebaker exited the auto business completely in March 1966. The shutdown of Studebaker's automotive operations in South Bend combined with Singer closing its plant 1954 dealt two big blows to the NJI&I. Other industries took over parts of the former Studebaker plant like Allied Stamping which offset some of the lost business.

The New Jersey, Indiana & Illinois name is derived from the three states where Singer operated plants at the time of charter. Its nickname was "the Jersey Line." The railroad was eventually taken over by the Wabash and operated through the Norfolk and Western takeover. The line continued to service several customers until the NS-Conrail takeover allowed NS to access their customers via the former New York Central Chicago line. The mainline to Pine was abandoned and removed to just past Calvert Street in the late 1990s.

== Rolling stock ==
NJI&I was a steam railroad until the late 1940s. The line was dieselized with an Alco S-1 and a EMD NW2 (ex-Indiana Northern RR) switcher locomotive. The latter currently is stored in Ohio. Operations now are handled by Norfolk Southern.

== Buildings and structures ==
While most of the NJI&I was torn out and abandoned two historic structures related to its heritage remain. The headquarters at 1508 W. Western Avenue in South Bend still stands and was used as a daycare facility. The former Singer plant is no longer connected by rail but part of the complex is still standing as a senior citizen's home on Western Avenue. This Singer plant was the main reason for creation of NJI&I. In October 2018, the roundhouse at 1625 South Olive Street was torn down.

== Current operations ==
Norfolk Southern services customers in South Bend at night using an Elkhart-based job that arrives in South Bend around 8PM. It works the former NYC Kankakee Belt Line and NJI&I from the office along the Kankakee Belt just east of the overpass at Sample and Olive Streets in South Bend. Customers include Steel Warehouse (steel coils), South Bend Ethanol (corn), an Omnisource scrap yard, West Plains Distribution for receiving aggregates, and Molding Products. In the past NS serviced customers on South Bend's south and southwest sides from a local job based on Sample Street near Oliver including Hanson Storage on the former PRR Vandalia Line remnant. The PRR Vandalia line remnant was abandoned and removed by NS though isolated tracks remain in place off Chippewa Avenue by the former AM General plant, originally a Studebaker truck plant.

NS in the mid-2000s rationalized the remaining tracks of the former NYC, NJI&I, and Indiana Northern from Olive east to Prairie down to a single track.
