= Dayton District =

Railroad line in Ohio, US

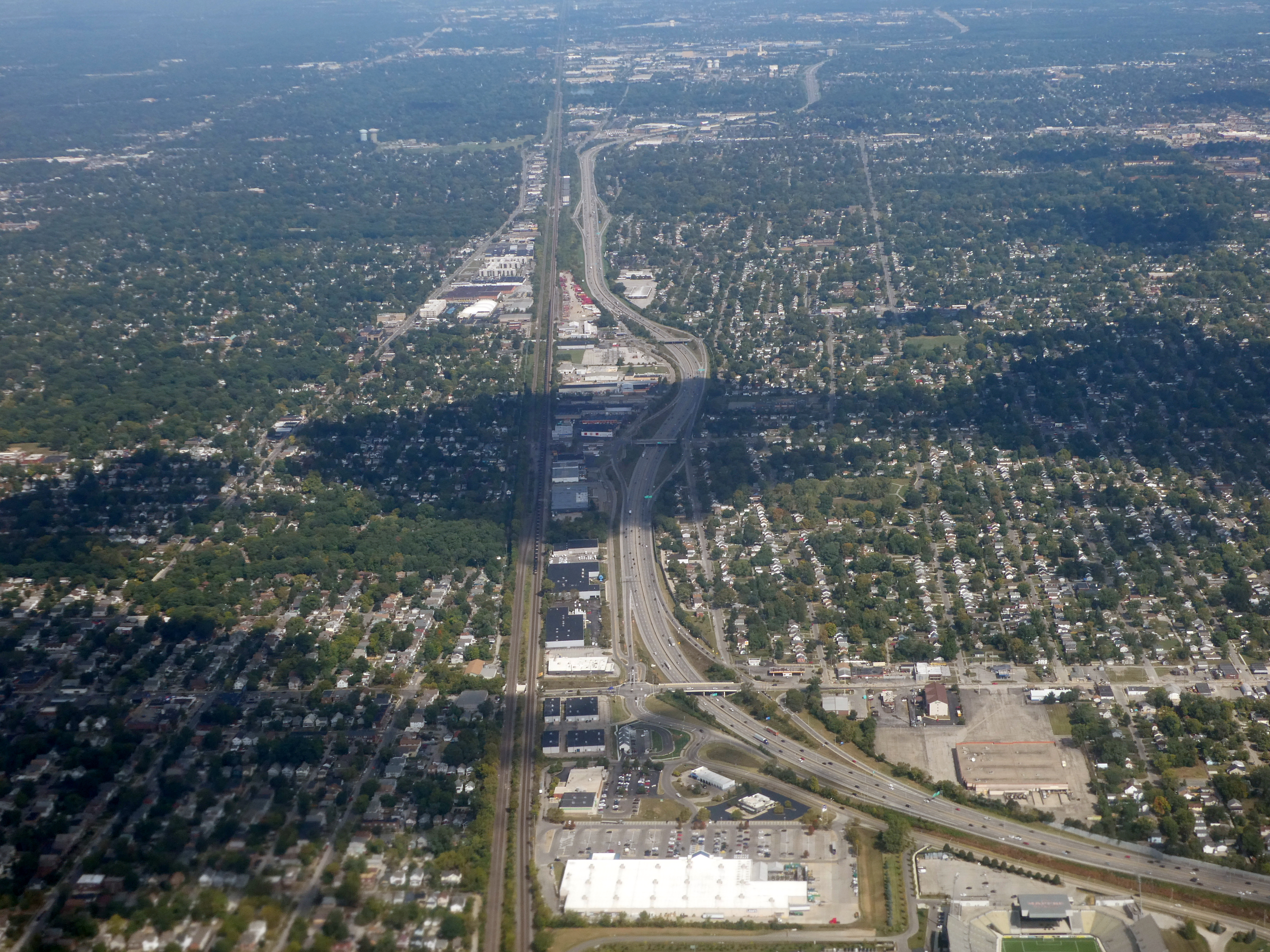
- The Columbus Line Subdivision, the north end of the Dayton District, and the Sandusky District paralleling Interstate 71 through northeast Columbus

Overview
- Other name: Cincinnati Line
- Status: Operational
- Owner: Norfolk Southern
- Locale: Ohio
- Termini: Columbus; Cincinnati (Sharonville)

Service
- Type: Freight rail
- System: Norfolk Southern
- Operator(s): Norfolk Southern

Technical
- Number of tracks: 1-2
- Track gauge: 4 ft 8 1/2 in (1,435 mm) standard gauge

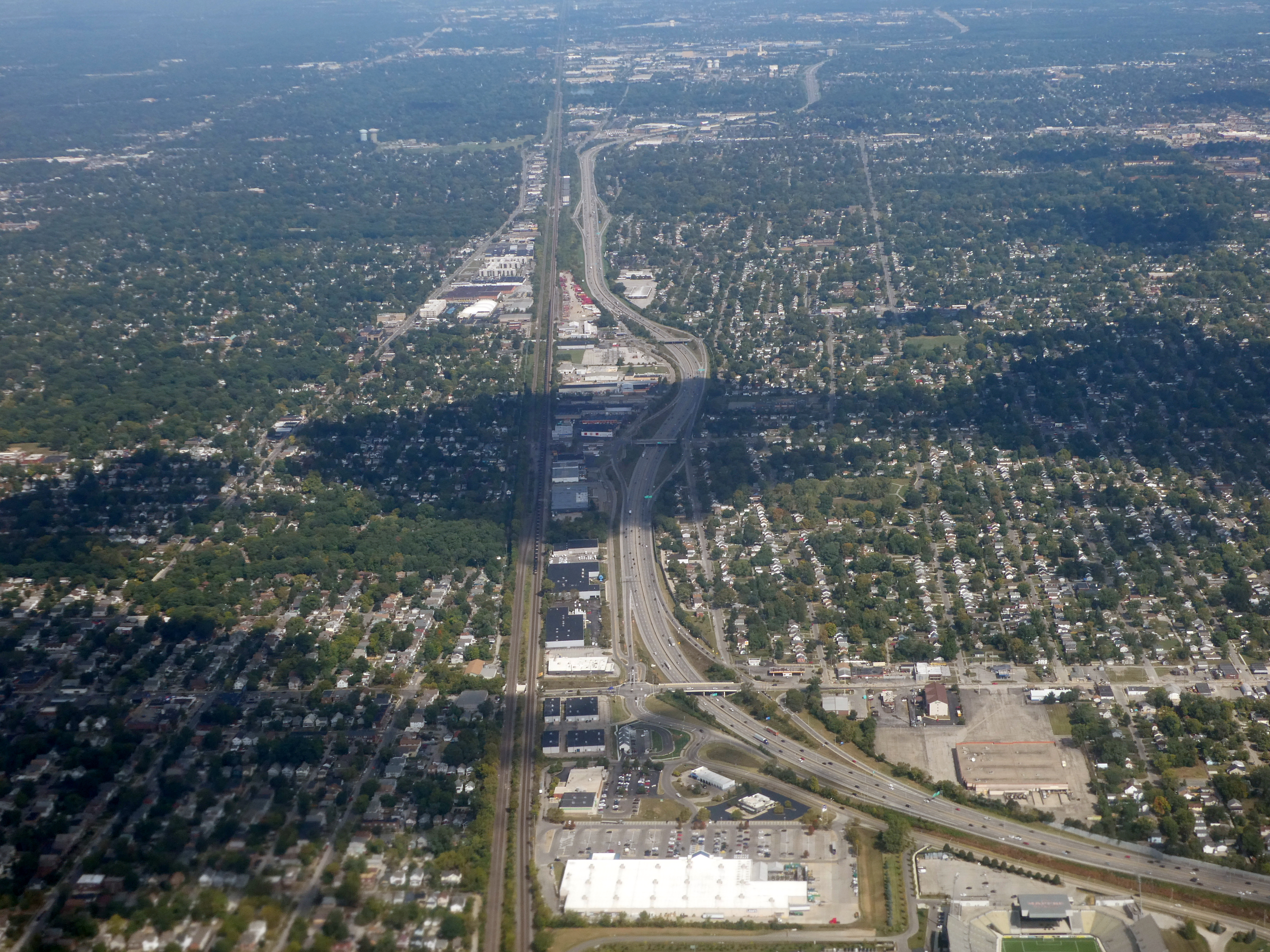
The Columbus Line Subdivision, the north end of the Dayton District, and the Sandusky District paralleling Interstate 71 through northeast Columbus

The Dayton District is a railroad line owned and operated by the Norfolk Southern Railway in the U.S. state of Ohio. The line runs from Columbus southwest to Cincinnati along former Pennsylvania Railroad and New York Central Railroad lines. Its east end is at or near the Columbus District, Sandusky District, and West Virginia Secondary; its south end is in Ivorydale, where it meets the Indiana and Ohio Railway's Midland Subdivision, and just past that in Winton Place, where it meets CSX Transportation's Cincinnati Terminal Subdivision. Along the way, it junctions the New Castle District at Evendale.

== History ==
The oldest part of the line is from Columbus west to London, was opened in 1850 by the Columbus and Xenia Railroad. In 1851, the Springfield and Dayton Railroad opened from Springfield southwest to Dayton. The Springfield and Columbus Railroad opened in 1853 from London west to Springfield. The Cincinnati and Springfield Railway opened the final piece, between Dayton and Bond Hill (part of Cincinnati), in 1872. The Columbus and Xenia Railroad became part of the Little Miami Railroad, which then was absorbed into the Pennsylvania Railroad, while the rest became New York Central Railroad system. The two companies merged to form Penn Central Transportation in 1968 and were taken over by Conrail in 1976. What was then known as the Cincinnati Line was assigned to Norfolk Southern in the 1999 breakup of Conrail. As of 2026, the route is legally owned by Pennsylvania Lines, LLC, but Norfolk Southern (its parent company) still owns and operates the subsidiary.
