= Hatfield, Kentucky =

Unincorporated community in Kentucky, United States

Hatfield
- Unincorporated community
- Location within the state of Kentucky Hatfield (the United States)
- Coordinates: 37°43′28″N 82°22′7″W
- Country: United States
- State: Kentucky
- County: Pike
- Elevation: 709 ft (216 m)
- Time zone: UTC-5 (Eastern (EST))
  - Summer (DST): UTC-4 (EDT)
- GNIS feature ID: 508204

Hatfield is an unincorporated community in Pike County, Kentucky, United States.

A post office was established in the community in 1903, and named for its first postmaster, James F. Hatfield. The post office closed in 1925.
