= Memphis District — West End =

Railway line in Alabama and Tennessee

The Norfolk Southern Railway Memphis District — West End runs between Norfolk Southern Sheffield Yard (MP 401.0A) in Sheffield, Alabama to Tower 17 (MP 551.7A) at Memphis, Tennessee. The Memphis District — IC District (now operated by the West Tennessee Railroad) connects at Rudy (MP 457.3A) on the east side of Corinth, Mississippi. The Kansas City Southern Railway Artesia Subdivision crosses at MP 458.8A in Corinth. West of Rossville, Tennessee (MP 521.1A) is the entrance to the Rossville Intermodal Facility, which turns south off the mainline towards the Mississippi state line. The mainline continues into Memphis, where it reaches the NS Harris Yard at MP 545.0A. On the west end of the Harris Yard two mainlines run towards downtown and are identified as the East and West Mains. The West Main crosses the Union Pacific Railroad Memphis Subdivision at KC Junction. Both mains terminate at Tower 17 in downtown Memphis.
