= SB Line (Norfolk Southern) =

The SB Line is a railroad line owned and operated by the Norfolk Southern Railway in the U.S. state of South Carolina. It runs from Kingville northerly via Camden and Lancaster to Rock Hill, though large parts are abandoned. The only pieces still used by Norfolk Southern are from the SC Line at Kingville to Wateree and from the Catawba River to the R Line in Rock Hill. The piece between Kershaw and the Catawba River is now owned by the Lancaster and Chester Railway.

The short spur to Wateree serves a Duke Energy plant.

In 2001, the Lancaster and Chester Railway leased the line between Kershaw and the Catawba River. It bought the line in 2003.

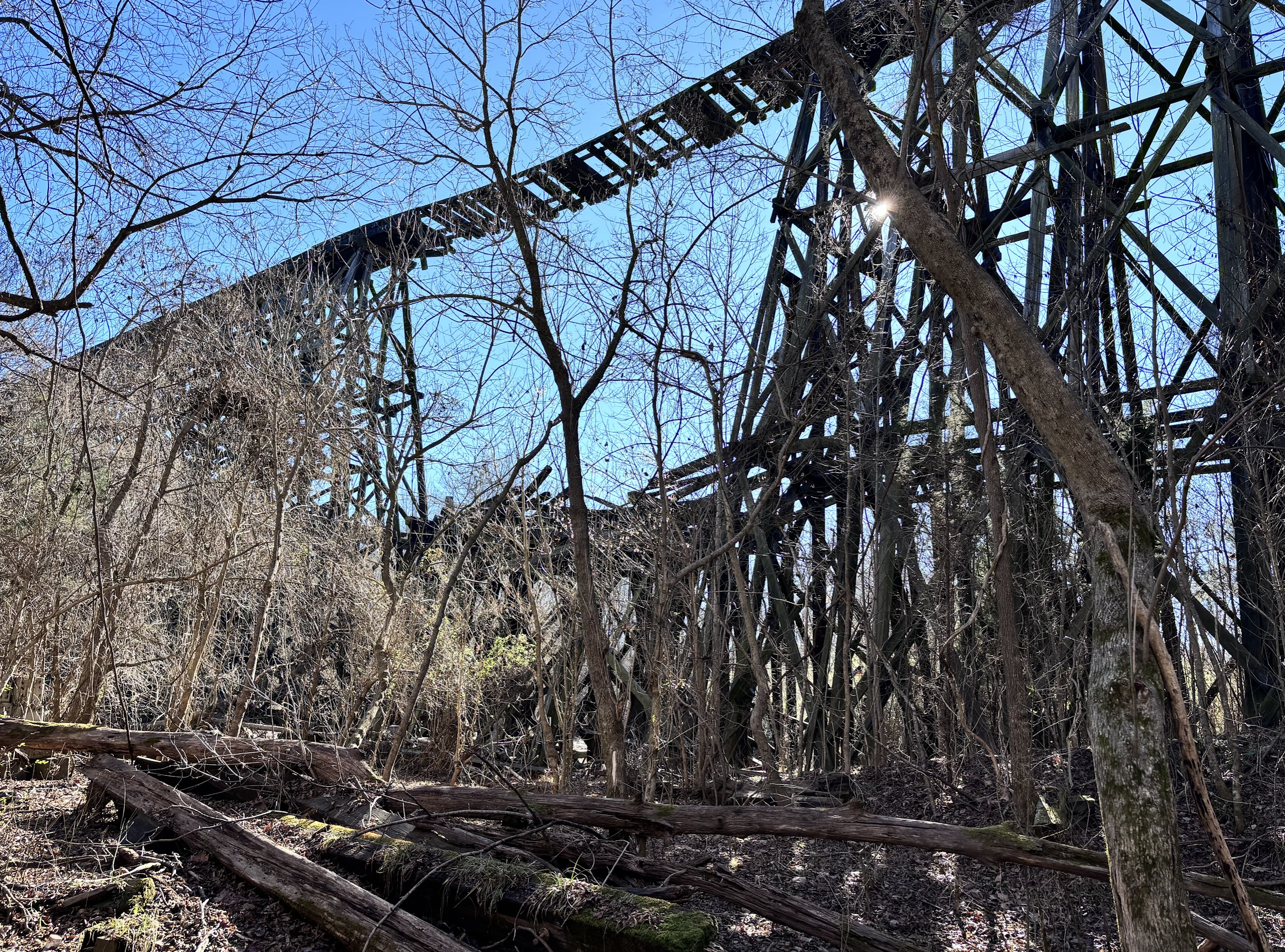
An abandoned trestle on the SB Line, over Kings Creek

Service between the CSX Transportation Eastover Subdivision at Foxville and Hasskamp was discontinued in 2005.
