= Kankakee Belt Route =

The Kankakee Belt Route is the nickname for the Illinois Division of the New York Central Railroad, which extended from South Bend, Indiana, through Kankakee, Illinois, and westward to Zearing, Illinois. This line was sometimes referred to as the "3 I Line", in reference to a corporate predecessor, the "Indiana, Illinois & Iowa Railroad". That portion of the line west of Kankakee to Moronts, Illinois, roughly parallels the Illinois River in Northern Illinois and was used, in large part, to transport corn toward eastern markets. See Kankakee Outwash Plain

== History ==
In the mid-1930s, waterway improvements were made on the Illinois River to improve barge movement (for example, new wider and deeper locks at Lockport). These improvements enabled the Illinois River to handle larger barges as well as movement of Tank Landing Ships (LST) constructed by the Chicago Bridge and Iron Company at Seneca, IL during World War II to New Orleans. After these improvements, significant grain traffic (primarily corn) was drawn away from the railroads to the river barges. Corn was now being moved to Chicago by barge, transferred to rail car at Great Lakes facilities and then shipped to Eastern US destinations by rail.

Prior to 1957, barge rates from ports along the Illinois River to Chicago and then via rail from Chicago to eastern destinations had a total shipping cost of 53.625 cents for corn and 54.125 cents for corn products. At the same time, the rates for shipping corn via all-rail routes from origins on the Kankakee Belt Line to eastern markets averaged 72 cents for corn and 72.5 cents for corn products.

What took place from 1956 to the Supreme Court decision in 1964 MECHLING BARGE LINES v. U.S., 376 U.S. 375 (1964) is another episode in the long and continued competitive struggle between the railroads and waterway barge lines.

== Today ==
Today, the Norfolk Southern operates the Kankakee Belt Route (ex-Conrail, ex-NYC, Kankakee Belt Line). The Kankakee Belt Route sees around eight to ten trains daily, from the BNSF (old AT&SF main line) at Streator, Illinois to Norfolk Southern Railway interchanges and facilities in Indiana. It still serves as a Chicago bypass.

The north-south portion of the Kankakee Belt Line (Gary, IN to Danville, IL) acquired the name "Danville Secondary" when the line was under ownership of Conrail. South of Schneider, where this N-S line crosses the current Norfolk Southern (ex-Penn Central/NYC) line, down to Danville was abandoned ("out of service") in 1994. The abandoned portion of the line measures 76.2 miles.

The west end of this Norfolk Southern Line now ends at the former Illinois River bridge east of Depue, due south of Seatonville. This Illinois River swing bridge at DePue has an interesting history. The bridge was hit by a barge in the 1960s, caught fire and the bridge tender killed. This swing bridge was removed in the early 1980s, and much of the track from Illinois River to Ladd was removed. Illinois Railway acquired old-NYC trackage between Depue and Ladd. In 2004, Illinois Railway acquired trackage between the Wye (“Y”) with BNSF at Zearing, thru Ladd and Spring Valley to LaSalle.

The east end of the Kankakee Belt towards South Bend is unused except for the local trackage around South Bend. NS operates the local trackage of the Kankakee Belt in South Bend in conjunction with their operations of the former New Jersey, Indiana, and Illinois Railroad, a Wabash subsidiary, and the Vandalia line, a former PRR route from Logansport. Since the demise of Studebaker and Singer, these lines are lightly used with no more than five customers total. The track between here and the NIPSCO plant in Wheatfield was removed in 1983.

== NYC Kankakee Belt Line – Illinois section (1964) ==
List of Illinois cities and interchange railroads (east to west) as of 1964

- Litchfield, Illinois – Milwaukee Road
- Momence, Illinois – Chicago and Eastern Illinois Railroad
- Sun River Terrace - Milwaukee Road
- Kankakee, Illinois – Illinois Central Railroad and New York Central Railroad
- Reddick, Illinois – Wabash Railroad
- Dwight, Illinois – Gulf, Mobile and Ohio Railroad, old Alton Railroad
- Streator, Illinois – Atchison, Topeka and Santa Fe Railway, Chicago, Burlington and Quincy Railroad
- Lostant, Illinois – Illinois Central Railroad
- Illinois River bridge (removed) at 41°18′50.87″N, 89°16′43.02″W
- De Pue, Illinois – Chicago, Rock Island and Pacific Railroad
- Ladd, Illinois – Chicago, Milwaukee, St. Paul and Pacific Railroad, Chicago and North Western Railway, and LaSalle and Bureau County Railroad (LS&BC), also known as "The Bee"
- Zearing, Illinois – Chicago, Burlington and Quincy Railroad

== NYC Kankakee Belt Line – Indiana section (1964) ==
List of Indiana cities and interchange railroads (east to west) as of 1964

- South Bend, Indiana – New York Central Railroad and Grand Trunk Railway
- North Liberty, Indiana – Wabash Railroad
- Walkerton, Indiana – Baltimore and Ohio Railroad and Nickel Plate Railroad
- Hamlet, Indiana – Pennsylvania Railroad
- Knox, Indiana – Nickel Plate Railroad
- North Judson, Indiana – Pennsylvania Railroad, Erie Railroad, Chesapeake and Ohio Railway
- San Pierre, Indiana – Monon Railroad
- Shelby, Indiana – Monon Railroad
- Schneider, Indiana – New York Central Railroad
