= W Line (Norfolk Southern) =

The W Line is a railroad line owned and operated by the Norfolk Southern Railway in the U.S. states of North Carolina and South Carolina. It runs from Asheville, North Carolina southeasterly via Spartanburg, South Carolina to Columbia, South Carolina, but the portion northwest of Landrum, South Carolina (over the Saluda Grade) has been closed since December 2001.

An April 19, 2014, report from WLOS, the ABC affiliate in Asheville, said that Norfolk Southern was looking to sell or lease the W Line from Asheville to Flat Rock. As of July 9, 2014, NS had entered an agreement to lease out the northern portion of the line to a Watco-owned shortline named the Blue Ridge Southern Railroad:

Watco to Acquire North Carolina Trackage, July 9, 2014 Later this month the Blue Ridge Southern Railroad (BLU), a subsidiary of Watco, will acquire about 90 miles of track from Norfolk Southern in North Carolina. The lines include 47 miles between Murphy Junction and Dillsboro, 25 miles between Asheville and East Flat Rock, and 20 miles between Hendersonville and Pisgah Forest. The new railroad plans to hire about 30 employees including supervisors, train crews, and maintenance personnel.

As was later reported, Norfolk Southern in fact sold this portion of the line to Watco, along with the defunct TR Line that branches from the W Line at Hendersonville, North Carolina and runs west to Pisgah Forest, North Carolina, and another branch line to the west of Asheville. Ownership of the three lines was transferred effective July 26, 2014.
