= Saluda Grade =

Steepest standard-gauge mainline railway grade in the United States

Coordinates: 35°13′25″N 82°20′52″W

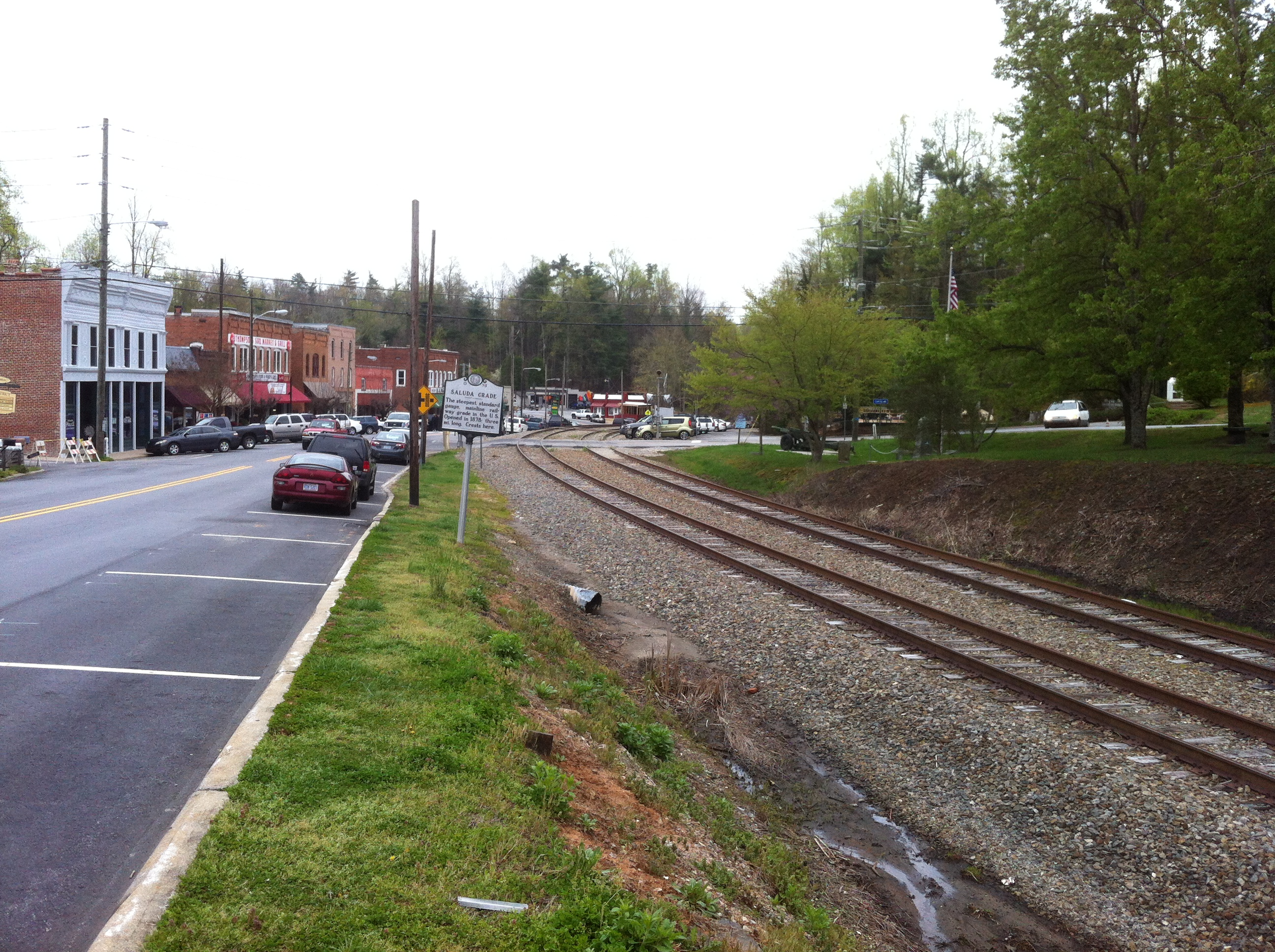
- The top of Saluda Grade in downtown Saluda

History
- Opened: July 4, 1878
- Closed: December 9, 2001

Technical
- Number of tracks: 1
- Track gauge: 1,435 mm (4 ft 8 1/2 in) standard gauge

Saluda Grade was the steepest standard-gauge mainline railway grade in the United States. Owned by the Norfolk Southern Railway as part of its W Line, Saluda Grade in Polk County, North Carolina, gained 606 feet (185 m) in elevation in fewer than three miles (4.8 km) between Melrose and Saluda, North Carolina. Average grade was 4.24 percent for 2.6 miles (4.2 km) and maximum was 4.9% for about 300 feet (91 m). In late 2001, Norfolk Southern took the line containing the grade out of service for economic reasons. In a contract signed August 5, 2024, Saluda Grade was sold to the Saluda Grade Trail Conservancy, with plans to convert to a rail trail.

== History ==
Captain Charles W. Pearson was assigned to select a route for the Asheville and Spartanburg Railroad (A&SRR) to ascend the Blue Ridge front; the area where the rolling hills of the Piedmont end at the foot of the Blue Ridge Mountains. Despite numerous surveys, no route was found for a railroad to traverse the mountains at a tolerable grade; the best route followed the Pacolet River valley and gorge. The line began its climb at the bottom of Melrose Mountain, where Tryon is today, at 1,081 feet (329 m), and continued on the south side of the Pacolet valley. At Melrose, the Saluda Grade began and climbed to the town of Saluda, cresting in the center of town at an elevation of 2,097 feet (639 m).

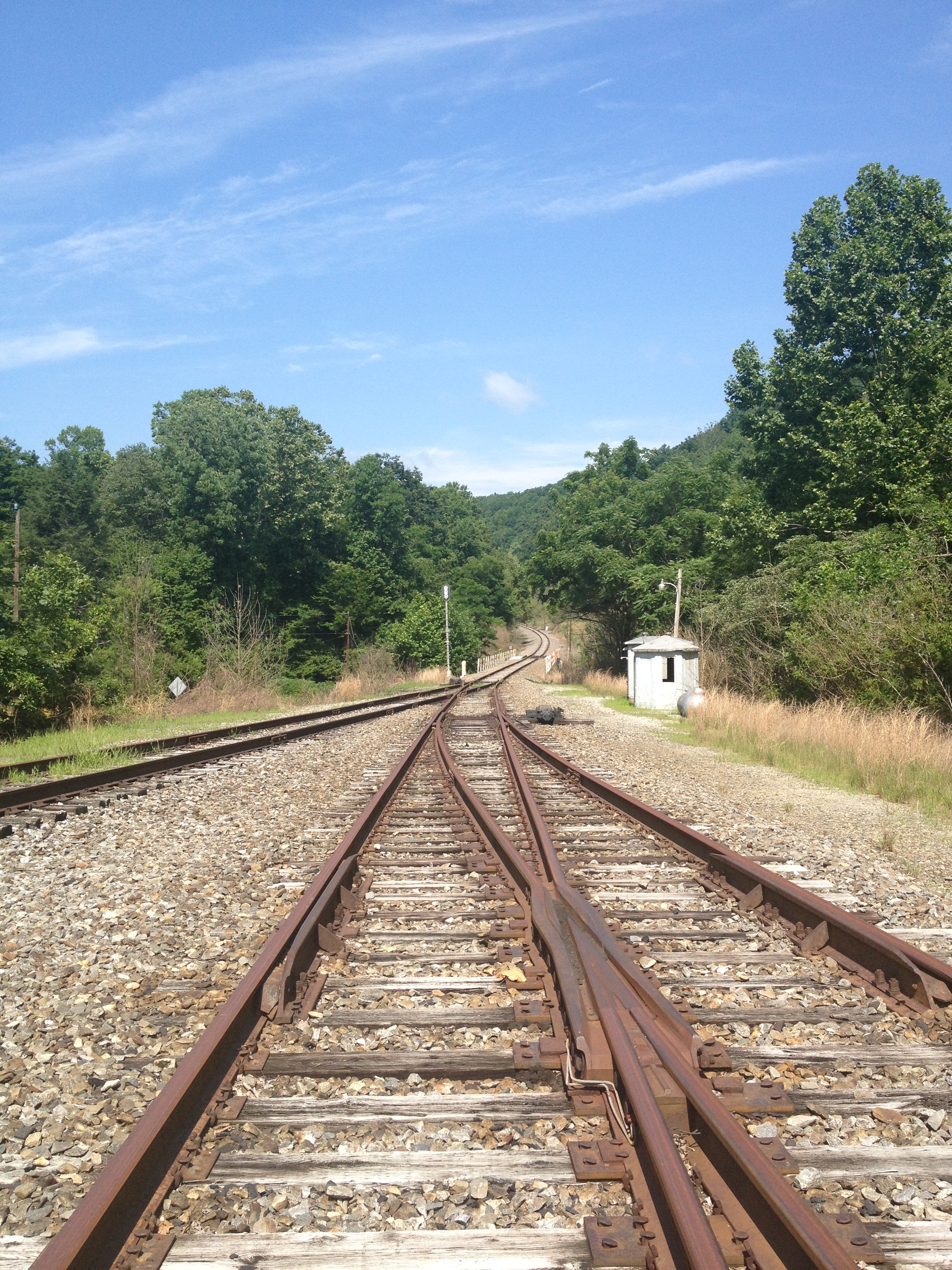
The bottom of Saluda Grade at Melrose in 2013

Because of accidents involving downgrade runaway trains in the late 1880s, A&SRR's successor, the Southern Railway built two runaway safety spur tracks, which were covered with 60-foot (18 m) piles of earth that could stop downgrade runaway trains. These were originally staffed junctions that were always switched to the spurs; only upon hearing a whistle signal from a downgrade train would the signaller staffing a spur junction throw the switch to keep the train on the main line. In later years, CTC signaling was installed along with automated switches and timer circuits for the one remaining runaway safety track at the bottom of the grade at Melrose. Trains running downgrade were required to travel no faster than 8 miles per hour (13 km/h) when approaching the runaway track switch. This would allow a timer circuit to determine if the train was under control, in which case the switch from the runaway track at Melrose would be aligned to the mainline. But for speeds greater than 8 miles per hour (13 km/h) the switch would remain aligned for the runaway track. Saluda Grade was one of the few grades in the country where uphill trains could travel faster than their downhill counterparts. However, most uphill trains had to double or triple the grade, splitting the train into sections to be taken up to Saluda one at a time and reassembled there for the rest of the trip to Asheville.

Norfolk Southern suspended freight traffic between East Flat Rock, North Carolina and Landrum, South Carolina in December 2001, thus ceasing operations on the Saluda Grade. In April 2003, Norfolk Southern severed the line from the rest of its system by placing mounds of dirt over the tracks and disconnecting the rails at mile posts 26 and 45. The signal system was not in use, and grade crossings had their arms removed and signals covered. Norfolk Southern continued to inspect and maintain the right-of-way after placing the segment out of service, removing fallen trees and spraying herbicide on encroaching vegetation, but multiple washouts of the roadbed have occurred between Zirconia and the South Carolina border, rendering the line impassable.

Talks in recent years of a passenger train excursion and a rail-to-trail conversion made no headway. Norfolk Southern stated it did not intend to abandon the line. However, in 2014 Norfolk Southern sold a portion of the W Line south of Asheville between mileposts 1 and 26 to Watco, a Class III shortline railroad operator. Watco operates this segment as the Blue Ridge Southern Railroad. Norfolk Southern still retained ownership of the out-of-service segment over the Saluda Grade.

On July 20, 2022, Upstate Forever announced its desire to turn the portions of the abandoned Saluda Grade into a rail trail. In February 2023, Norfolk Southern agreed to sell 31 miles of the Saluda Grade to another group planning a trail, The Saluda Grade Trail Conservancy. Terms were not disclosed. As of August 2023, "a coalition of three nonprofits is spearheading the Saluda Grade Trail. Conserving Carolina is leading efforts in North Carolina, while PAL: Play. Advocate. Live Well. and Upstate Forever are leading efforts in South Carolina." On October 3, 2023, the North Carolina General Assembly passed a law funding the acquisition of the corridor from the state line to Zirconia, and it authorized the Department of Natural and Cultural Resources to add the corridor to the State Trail System. The contract was signed August 7, 2024.

== See also ==
- List of steepest gradients on adhesion railways
- Reuben Wells

== Bibliography ==
- Loy, Sallie; Hillman, Dick; Cates, C. Pat (2004). The Southern Railway. Images of Rail (1st ed.). Arcadia Publishing. ISBN 978-0-7385-1641-7.
