= Midland Subdivision =

Railroad line between Cincinnati and Columbus, Ohio, USA

Overview
- Status: Active
- Owner: CSX Transportation
- Locale: Southern Ohio
- Termini: Cincinnati; Columbus

Service
- Type: Freight rail
- System: Indiana and Ohio Railway
- Operator(s): Indiana and Ohio Railway

Technical
- Number of tracks: 1
- Track gauge: 4 ft 8 1/2 in (1,435 mm) standard gauge

The Midland Subdivision is a railroad owned by CSX Transportation and operated by Indiana and Ohio Railway in the U.S. State of Ohio. The line runs from St. Bernard, Ohio to Columbus, Ohio for a total of 107.0 miles. At its west end the line connects to the Norfolk Southern Cincinnati Line (the westernmost part of the Dayton District), and at its east end the line connects with the Dayton District near its easternmost point.

== See also ==
- List of CSX Transportation lines
