= Spencer Yard =

Large railway yard in North Carolina, USA

Coordinates: 35.7356°N 80.3407°W

Spencer Yard a.k.a. Linwood Yard is one of the largest classification railroad yards in North Carolina. It is also one of the remaining hump yards in North America, which are steadily being eliminated. The yard is operated by Norfolk Southern Railway (NS). The yard is located 8 miles (13 km) north of Salisbury, and 3 miles (4.8 km) north of Spencer, off Interstate 85 in Davidson County, west of Linwood. The yard is on the edge of the NS Charlotte District and Danville District, and the Asheville District is nearby in Salisbury.

== History ==
Spencer Yard, a.k.a. Linwood Yard for the location, is named after Samuel Spencer, the first president of Southern Railway. It started operations in 1979 for the Southern Railway, before the NS merger. The project cost $49 million to build. The yard is 376 acres (1.52 km^{2}) and 4.5 miles (7.2 km) long and consists of more than 65 miles (105 km) of track. The yard facilities include diesel locomotive repair shops, which replaced older facilities at the nearby Spencer Shops.

== Current operation ==
The hump was shut down in 2020 and now the yard only features four trains directly to and from it, mostly being used to divide up local freight rather than classify cars for long-distance hauling.
