= Columbus District =

Norfolk Southern freight rail line in Ohio

Overview
- Other name: Columbus District Subdivision
- Status: Active
- Owner: Norfolk Southern Railway
- Locale: South-central Ohio, United States
- Termini: Vera, near Portsmouth, Ohio; CW Tower, Columbus, Ohio

Service
- Type: Freight rail line
- System: Norfolk Southern Railway
- Operator: Norfolk Southern Railway

Technical
- Line length: 96.1 mi (154.7 km) (timetable distance)
- Character: Freight
- Operating speed: 60 mph (97 km/h) maximum authorized speed in 2008 timetable, subject to restrictions

The Columbus District is a Norfolk Southern Railway freight rail district in south-central Ohio, United States. The line runs between the Portsmouth-area junction at Vera and the Columbus terminal area at CW Tower, following part of the former Norfolk and Western Railway route through the Scioto Valley.

In Norfolk Southern employee-timetable sources, the district is listed between milepost N 608.5 at Vera and milepost N 704.6 at CW Tower, a timetable distance of approximately 96.1 miles.

== Route ==
The Columbus District extends north from the Portsmouth area toward Columbus. Timetable locations on the district include Vera, Glen Jean, Omega, Lunbeck, Renick, Chillicothe, Scioto, West Dorney, West Circleville, Ashville, Craft, Lockbourne, Rohr, Reese, Valley Crossing, Bannon and CW Tower.

The line passes through or near several communities in the Scioto Valley, including Chillicothe, Circleville, Ashville and Lockbourne, before entering the Columbus terminal area. At its Columbus end, the district connects with other Norfolk Southern and connecting-carrier trackage in the Columbus area.

=== Timetable locations ===
The following table lists selected timetable locations on the Columbus District from publicly available Norfolk Southern Lake Division timetables. Mileposts are shown using the railroad's N-prefix milepost series.

Selected locations on the Columbus District
Milepost	Location	Notes
N 608.5	Vera	Southern district limit near the Portsmouth area
N 634.6	East Glen Jean	Timetable location
N 635.3	West Glen Jean	Timetable location
N 646.7	Omega	Timetable location
N 652.0	Lunbeck	Timetable location
N 655.1	Renick	Timetable location
N 655.8	Chillicothe	Major city on the route
N 657.0	Scioto	Timetable location north of Chillicothe
N 674.4	West Dorney	Circleville-area timetable location
N 676.9	West Circleville	Circleville-area timetable location
N 684.8	Ashville	Timetable location south of Columbus
N 687.1	Craft	Timetable location
N 690.8	Lockbourne	Near the Rickenbacker logistics area
N 693.3	Rohr	Timetable location
N 694.5	Reese	Timetable location
N 696.7	Valley Crossing	Columbus terminal-area location
N 698.8	Bannon	Columbus terminal-area location
N 704.6	CW Tower	Northern district limit in the Columbus terminal area

== Operations ==
Norfolk Southern employee timetables list the Columbus District as part of the railroad's Lake Division. A 2008 Norfolk Southern timetable showed a maximum authorized speed of 60 mph between Vera and CW Tower, subject to lower-speed restrictions at specific curves, turnouts, bridges and terminal-area locations.

The district is primarily a freight route. Its modern significance is tied in part to the Columbus and Rickenbacker logistics area, including Norfolk Southern's Rickenbacker Intermodal Terminal near Columbus.

== History ==
The route originated with the Scioto Valley Railway, which built a line between Columbus and the Ohio River region in the late nineteenth century. Historical accounts of Columbus-area railroads identify the Scioto Valley route as a predecessor of the Norfolk and Western line between Columbus and the Portsmouth/Ironton region.

The Norfolk & Western Historical Society states that the Norfolk and Western Railway acquired the Scioto Valley and New England Railroad in 1890, making it part of the N&W system. The West Virginia Encyclopedia also describes the Scioto Valley Railway as a 126-mile line acquired by N&W in 1890, running from near Columbus to Coal Grove, Ohio, opposite Kenova, West Virginia.

In 1982, the Norfolk and Western Railway and the Southern Railway became subsidiaries of the newly formed Norfolk Southern Corporation. The former N&W route through the Scioto Valley later became part of Norfolk Southern's operating network.

== Rickenbacker and the Heartland Corridor ==
Norfolk Southern opened the Rickenbacker Intermodal Terminal near Columbus in March 2008. The terminal was built as part of the Rickenbacker Global Logistics Park and was intended to expand Norfolk Southern's intermodal capacity in central Ohio.

The terminal is associated with Norfolk Southern's Heartland Corridor, a public-private freight rail improvement program intended to provide a shorter double-stack intermodal route between the Port of Virginia, Columbus and Chicago. The Mid-America Freight Coalition identifies the Norfolk Southern Columbus intermodal facility as being located on the Columbus District Subdivision near Rickenbacker International Airport.

In 2012, Norfolk Southern announced an extension of Heartland Corridor-related clearance improvements between Columbus and Cincinnati. The project was intended to improve double-stack intermodal access between Cincinnati, Columbus and the Port of Virginia, and included additional capacity at the Rickenbacker terminal.

== See also ==
- Norfolk Southern Railway
- Norfolk and Western Railway
- Heartland Corridor
- Rickenbacker International Airport
- Chillicothe, Ohio
- Circleville, Ohio
- Portsmouth, Ohio
