= R-Line (Norfolk Southern) =

Railway line in the United States

The R-Line is a secondary main railway line running between Charlotte, North Carolina and Augusta, Georgia, United States. The line is operated by Norfolk Southern (NS) as part of the railway's Piedmont Division. The R-Line originally operated by the former Charlotte, Columbia and Augusta Railroad, before being merged in 1878 with the Richmond and Danville which merged with the Southern in 1894. Today it is now operated by NS.

Trains on the R-Line are mostly manifest, grain, coal, scrap, chemicals, and locals. Manifests to and from Linwood Yard use the line on a daily basis. Grain trains that use the R-Line are bound to and from Asheville, North Carolina.

Crew changes for Linwood Yard and Asheville through trains occur in Salisbury, North Carolina.

All trains are required to be given track authorities from the Columbia Dispatcher.

All southbound trains on the R-Line make connections to Savannah and Atlanta via the D-Line from Augusta, GA.

All trains on the R-Line must stop in the Norfolk Southern Columbia Yard.

== History ==
The Norfolk Southern R-Line was originally built and owned by the Charlotte and South Carolina Railroad in 1852. It was acquired by the Southern Railway in 1892. Trains continue to operate on the R-Line today and are all operated by the Norfolk Southern Railway. Trains historically ran from Augusta, GA to downtown Charlotte direct without using the present-day Norfolk Southern Charlotte District. In 1950 the Berryhill Cutoff was created connecting the R-line in South Charlotte to the Piedmont Division via Charlotte Junction keeping traffic off the South Charlotte to Uptown Charlotte Segment. Locals ran on the short segment of track until 1990. By then the segment of track was designated as the 'Old R Line' by the FRA.

In the late 1990s/early 2000s a temporary streetcar operation was done on the same right of way from Atherton Mill station in South End to Scaleybark Road in South Charlotte while roadbed was being rebuilt for operations from Atherton Mill to uptown Charlotte for future trolley operations. All operations on the old R Line ceased in 2002 once the new trolley main opened.

All old tracks and signaling were later removed and rebuilt on the right of way between 2005-2007 to make way for what is the present day Lynx Blue Line. Some of the Lynx right of way had to be re-accommodated next to the active portions of the NS R-line.
