= Meltwater channel =

A meltwater channel (or sometimes a glacial meltwater channel) is a channel cut into ice, bedrock or unconsolidated deposits by the flow of water derived from the melting of a glacier or ice-sheet. The channel may form on the surface of, within, beneath, along the margins of or downstream from the ice mass. Accordingly it would be referred to as supraglacial, englacial, subglacial, lateral (or ice-marginal) or proglacial.

Different forms of subglacial channel are described in glaciological literature including Nye or N-channels, Röthlisberger or R-channels and Hooke or H-channels. Tunnel valley is a related term descriptive of subglacial channels. Some examples of tunnel valleys in northwest England have also been described as iceways. The depositional landforms known as kames and eskers may often be found in association with meltwater channels.

An urstromtal is a proglacial or ice-marginal channel common in Germany and Poland formed during various of the Pleistocene glaciations which gave rise to the substantial Scandinavian ice sheet. A spillway is a term sometimes used for a channel carved by water overflowing from, for example, a proglacial lake. Examples of major glacial lake outbursts creating spillways along the southern margins of the Laurentide icesheet in North America are documented.

Meltwater channels associated with glaciation have also been identified on Mars.

== See also ==
- Fluvioglacial landform
