= Eel River (Wabash River tributary) =

Coordinates: 40.75032°N 86.37306°W

Eel River L'Anguille River, Kenapocomoco,, Kineepikwameekwa Siipiiwi (Miami-Illinois), Shoxamèkw Sipu (Delaware)
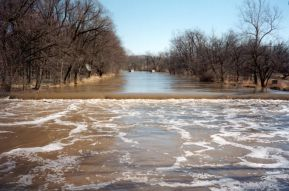
- Collamer Dam

- Location within Indiana
- Native name: Kineepikwameekwa Siipiiwi (Miami-Illinois)

Location
- Country: United States
- State: Indiana

Physical characteristics
- Source
  - location: Huntertown, Indiana
- Mouth: Wabash River
  - location: Logansport, Indiana
- Discharge
  - location: mouth
  - average: 848.48 cu ft/s (24.026 m^{3}/s) (estimate)

The Eel River is a 94-mile-long (151 km) tributary of the Wabash River in northern Indiana in the United States. Via the Wabash and Ohio rivers, its waters flow to the Mississippi River and ultimately the Gulf of Mexico. The Eel River rises southeast of Huntertown in Allen County and flows southwest through Allen, Whitley, Kosciusko, Wabash, Miami, and Cass counties to join the Wabash at Logansport. The river was called Kineepikwameekwa Siipiiwi - "river of the snake fish" by the Miami people, who inhabited the area at the time of European contact, the English rendered it as Ke-na-po-co-mo-co. It is the northern of the two rivers named Eel River within Indiana.

== Origins and history ==
=== Natural history ===
Originating as an "ice-marginal channel" at the edge of the retreating Saginaw Lobe of the Wisconsin Glacier, the Eel River was later buried by the glacier's advancing Erie Lobe. As the Erie Lobe retreated, the Eel formed a single stream with what is now upper Cedar Creek in DeKalb and Allen counties. The ancestral Eel River was also fed by glacial meltwater surging under the ice from the southeast through a "tunnel valley" known today as Cedar Creek Canyon. Blockage of the Eel's channel by outwash from the canyon and a decline in the volume of meltwater forced the upper Eel to change course into the canyon, creating today's Cedar Creek. This is a classic example of stream piracy that shifted almost 175,000 acres (710 km^{2}) of land from the Eel-Wabash watershed to that of the St. Joseph-Maumee.

=== Indigenous peoples and French exploration ===
The waterways were where indigenous peoples settled in prehistoric and historic times, as they were sources of food and water, and the avenues for transportation and trade. The Miami, an Algonquian-speaking people, called the river Kineepikwameekwa Siipiiwi or Ke-na-po-co-mo-co, meaning "river of the snake fish." Later French explorers, who also followed the waterways, called it the Rivière L'Anguille (Eel River).

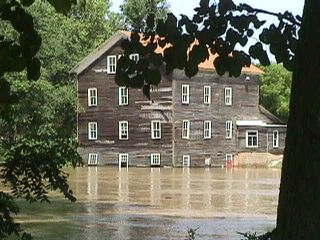
Stockdale Mill on the Northern Eel River at Roann, Indiana, in June 1998.

=== Political and military history ===
Before the United States consolidated its hold on the Northwest Territory, the Eel formed a rough boundary between the Potawatomi tribe on the north and the Miami tribe on the south. In addition, it was an area of competition between French and British colonial forces for decades before the American Revolution. Afterward, the US fought with American Indians in numerous battles sometimes called the Northwest Indian War.

In November 1780, a French militia force under Auguste Mottin de la Balme, who planned to seize a British trading post on the Eel near present-day Columbia City, was destroyed by the Miami led by Chief Michikinikwa, also known as "Little Turtle". On 19 October 1790, Chief Michikinikwa's warriors surprised and virtually annihilated a U.S. force under Colonel John Hardin in the Eel bottomlands southeast of present-day Churubusco.

On 7 August 1791, the Eel was the scene of another battle, when General James Wilkinson destroyed the Miami town of Kenapacomaqua 6 miles (9.7 km) upstream from present-day Logansport.

In September 1812, Colonel James Simrall, acting under orders from General William Henry Harrison, ravaged Miami farms and villages along the Eel in present-day Whitley County. He defeated a Miami force that stood and fought.

=== Literary reference ===
Ross Lockridge Jr., Raintree County, Boston: Houghton Mifflin (1948), pp. 93–94.

Johnny Shawnessy probably had a better guess about the river's name than anyone else as he was the only person in the County for years who made any research into the Indian culture. He finally decided that the river's name was related to the Indian word Shakamak, meaning long fish or eel. There was a Shakamak River in southern Indiana; and in the northern part of the state, an Eel River, which in the Miami tongue had been called the Kenapocomoko, or River of Snake Fish. The only drawback to Johnny's theory was the fact that he never found an eel in the Shamucky River.

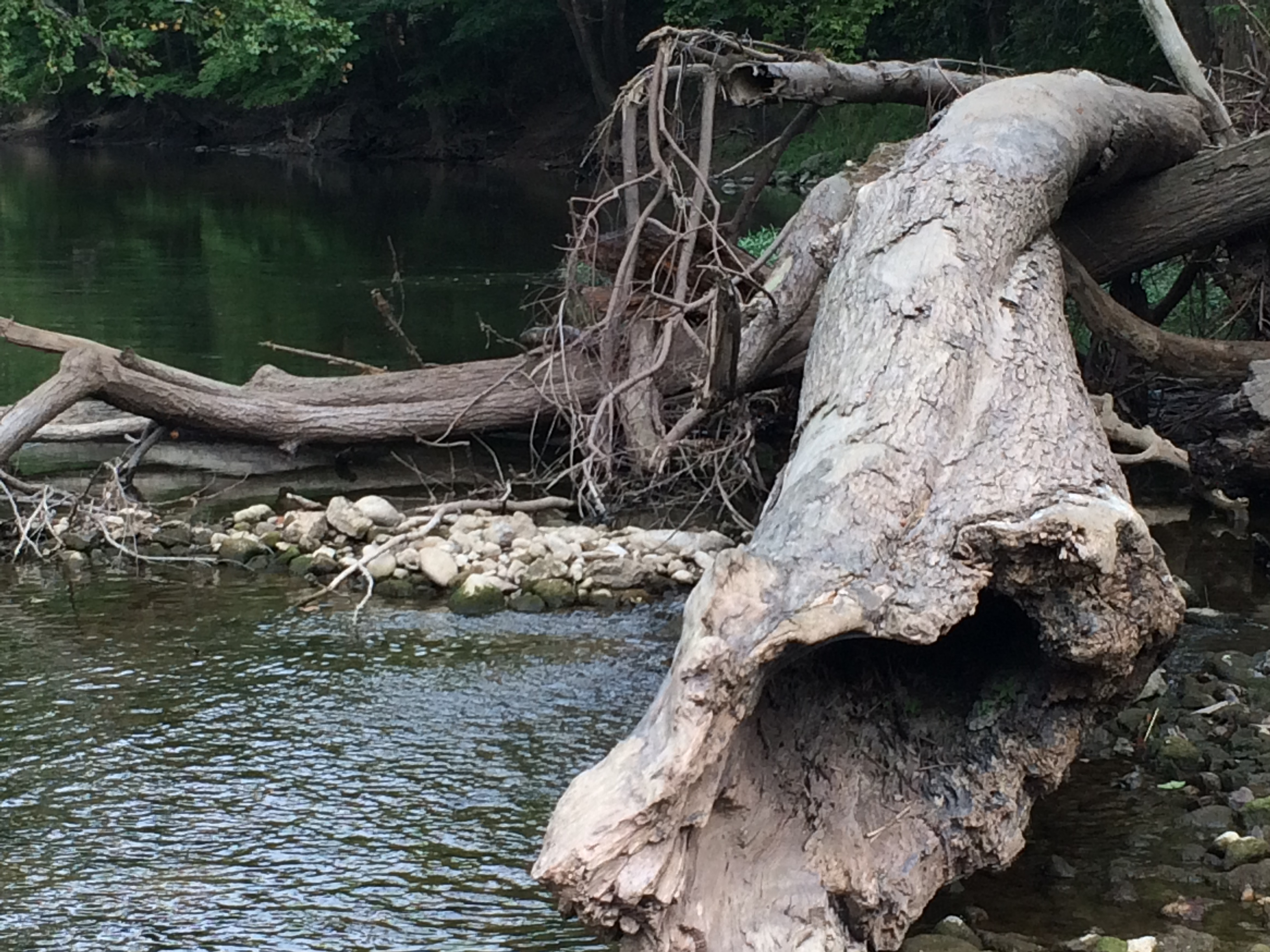
Eel river in early September 2015 location 41.0, -85.8

== See also ==
- List of rivers of Indiana
- Eel River Tribe

== Bibliography ==
- "Water Resource Availability in the Maumee River Basin, Indiana, Water Resource Assessment 96-5" (PDF). Indianapolis:Indiana Department of Natural Resources, Division of Water. 1996.
- Winger, Otho (1934). The Ke Na Po Co Mo Co: Eel River, the Home of Little Turtle. Whitley County Historical Society.
- Winger, Otho (1939). The Potawatomi Indians (1961 reprint ed.). The Elgin Press.
