= Tunnel valley =

Glacial-formed geographic feature

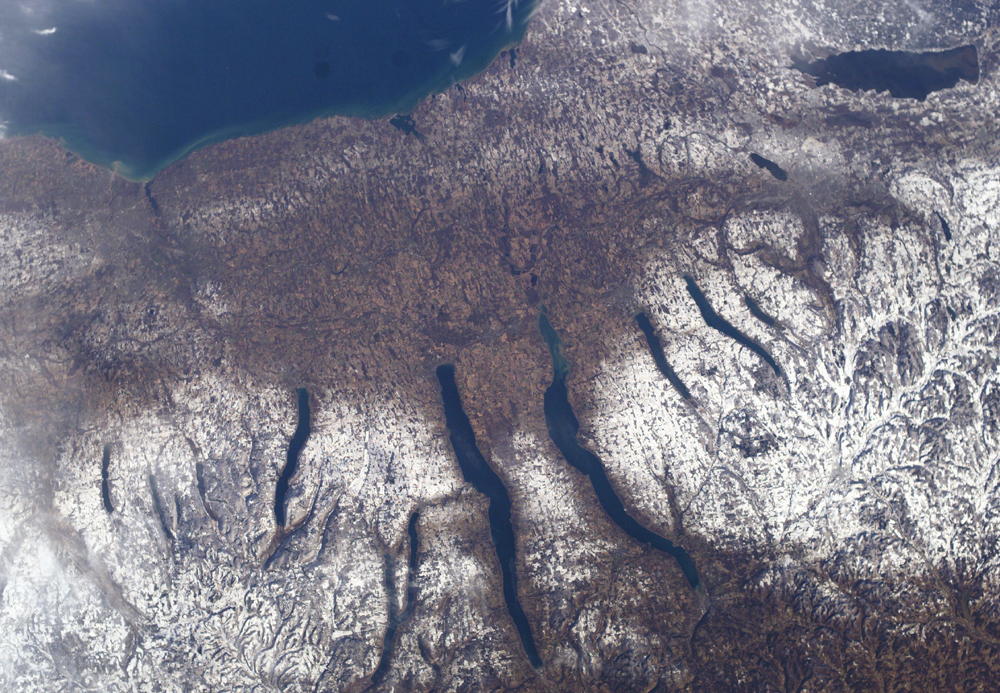
Lying south of Lake Ontario, the Finger Lakes of New York State formed in tunnel valleys.

A tunnel valley is a U-shaped valley originally cut under the glacial ice near the margin of continental ice sheets such as that now covering Antarctica and formerly covering portions of all continents during past glacial ages. They can be as long as 100 km (62 mi), 4 km (2.5 mi) wide, and 400 m (1,300 ft) deep.

Tunnel valleys were formed by subglacial erosion by water and served as subglacial drainage pathways carrying large volumes of meltwater. Their cross-sections often exhibit steep-sided flanks similar to fjord walls. They presently appear as dry valleys, lakes, seabed depressions, and as areas filled with sediment. If they are filled with sediment, their lower layers are filled primarily with glacial, glaciofluvial or glaciolacustrine sediment, supplemented by upper layers of temperate infill. They can be found in areas formerly covered by glacial ice sheets including Africa, Asia, North America, Europe, Australia and offshore in the North Sea, the Atlantic and in waters near Antarctica.

Tunnel valleys appear in the technical literature under several terms, including tunnel channels, subglacial valleys, iceways and linear incisions.

== Significance ==
Tunnel valleys play a role in identifying oil-rich areas in Arabia and North Africa. The Upper Ordovician–Lower Silurian materials there contain a roughly 20 m (66 ft) thick, carbon-rich layer of black shale. Approximately 30% of the world's oil is found in these shale deposits. Although the origin of these deposits is still under study, it has been established that the shale routinely overlies glacial and glacio-marine sediment deposited ~445 million years before the present by the Hirnantian glaciation. The shale has been linked to glacial meltwater nutrient enrichment of the shallow marine environment. Hence the presence of tunnel valleys is an indicator of the presence of oil in these areas.

Tunnel valleys represent a substantial fraction of all meltwater drainage from glaciers. Meltwater drainage influences the flow of glacial ice, which is important in understanding of the duration of glacial–interglacial periods, and aids in identifying glacial cyclicity, a problem that is important to palaeoenvironmental investigations.

Tunnel valleys are typically eroded into bedrock and filled with glacial debris of varying sizes. This configuration makes them excellent at capturing and storing water. Hence they serve an important role as aquifers across much of Northern Europe, Canada and the United States. Examples include Oak Ridges Moraine Aquifer, Spokane Valley-Rathdrum Prairie Aquifer, Mahomet Aquifer, the Saginaw Lobe Aquifer, and the Corning Aquifer.

== Characteristics ==
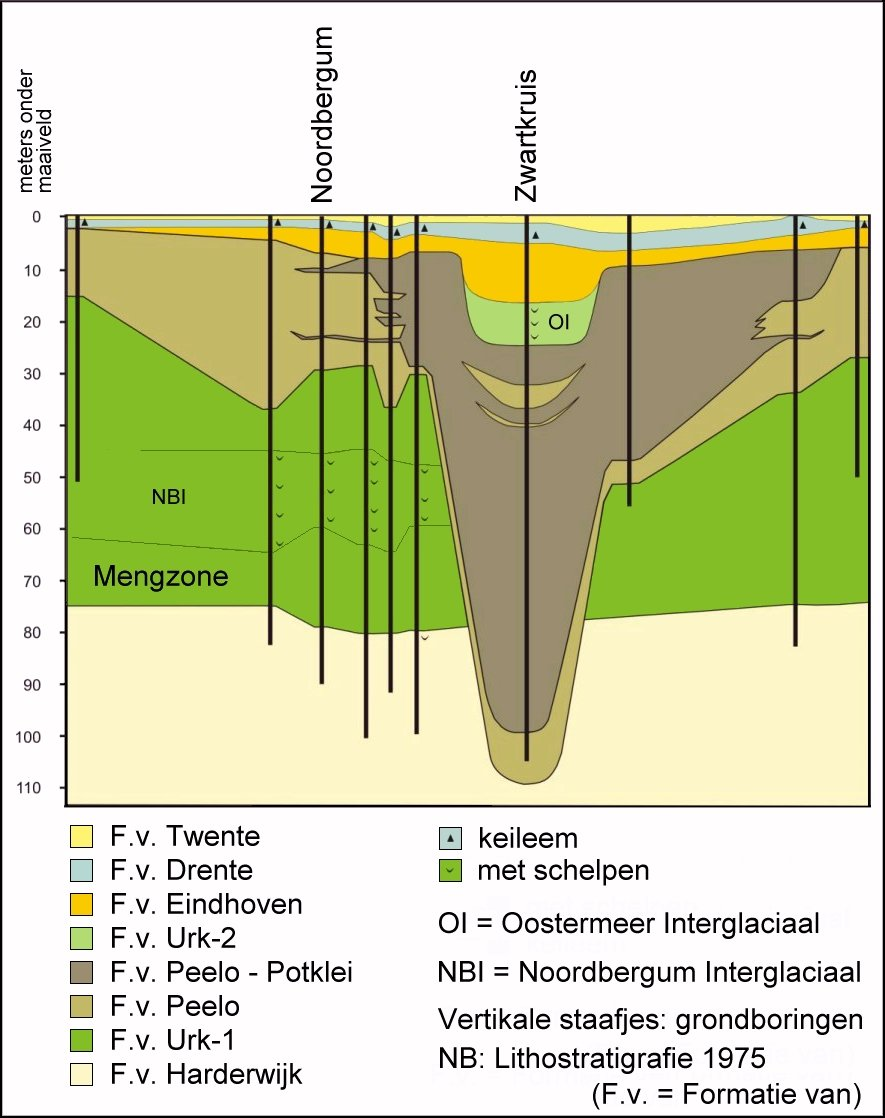
A figure in Dutch showing the cross-section of a tunnel valley which has been refilled after erosion into bedrock.

=== Buried, open and partially filled ===
Tunnel valleys have been observed as open valleys and as partially or totally buried valleys. If buried they may be partially or totally filled with glacial outwash or other debris. The valleys may be incised in bedrock, sand, silt, or clay.

A part of a tunnel valley may go uphill: water can flow uphill if it is under pressure in an enclosed pipe: for example in Doggerland (submerged land which is now part of the bed of the North Sea) are some infilled tunnel valleys that flowed from north to south across the hollow of the Outer Silver Pit.

=== Dimensions ===
They vary in channel depth and width; Danish examples run from 0.5–4 km (0.31–2.49 mi) wide and from 50–350 m (160–1,150 ft) deep. They vary in depth along their course, exhibiting overdeepening; overdeepened sections cut into bedrock and typically are significantly deeper than either upstream or downstream sections of the same tunnel valley. They have steep sides which are frequently asymmetric.

Tunnel valleys frequently include relatively straight individual segments parallel to and independent of one another. Tunnel valley courses may be periodically interrupted; the interruption may include a stretch of elevated esker, indicating the channel ran through ice for a distance. The below-grade sections typically run 5–30 km (3.1–18.6 mi) in length; in some cases the sections form a larger pattern of an interrupted channel composed of strings of depressions which can extend from 70–100 km (43–62 mi).

=== Structure ===
The upstream portion – that section furthest into the glacier – consists of a branching system forming a network, similar to the anastomostic branching patterns of the upper reaches of a river (as contrasted with dendritic patterns). They typically exhibit the largest cross-sectional area in the center of the course and terminate over a relatively short distance in elevated outwash fans at the ice-margin.

Tunnel valleys are found to cross the regional gradient – as a result they may be crosscut by modern stream networks. In one example, tributaries of the Kalamazoo River cut at nearly right angles across buried tunnel channel filled with ice and debris. They frequently terminate at a recessional moraine. Tunnel valleys from successive glaciations may crosscut one another.

Tunnel valleys frequently run along roughly parallel courses. They originate in and run through regions which include clear evidence of glacial erosion through abrasion and may exhibit striations and roche moutonnée. Depositional forms such as terminal moraines and outwash fans are found at their terminal end. In Michigan tunnel valley channels have been observed to diverge slightly with an average spacing between the channels of 6 km (3.7 mi) and a standard deviation of 2.7 km (1.7 mi).

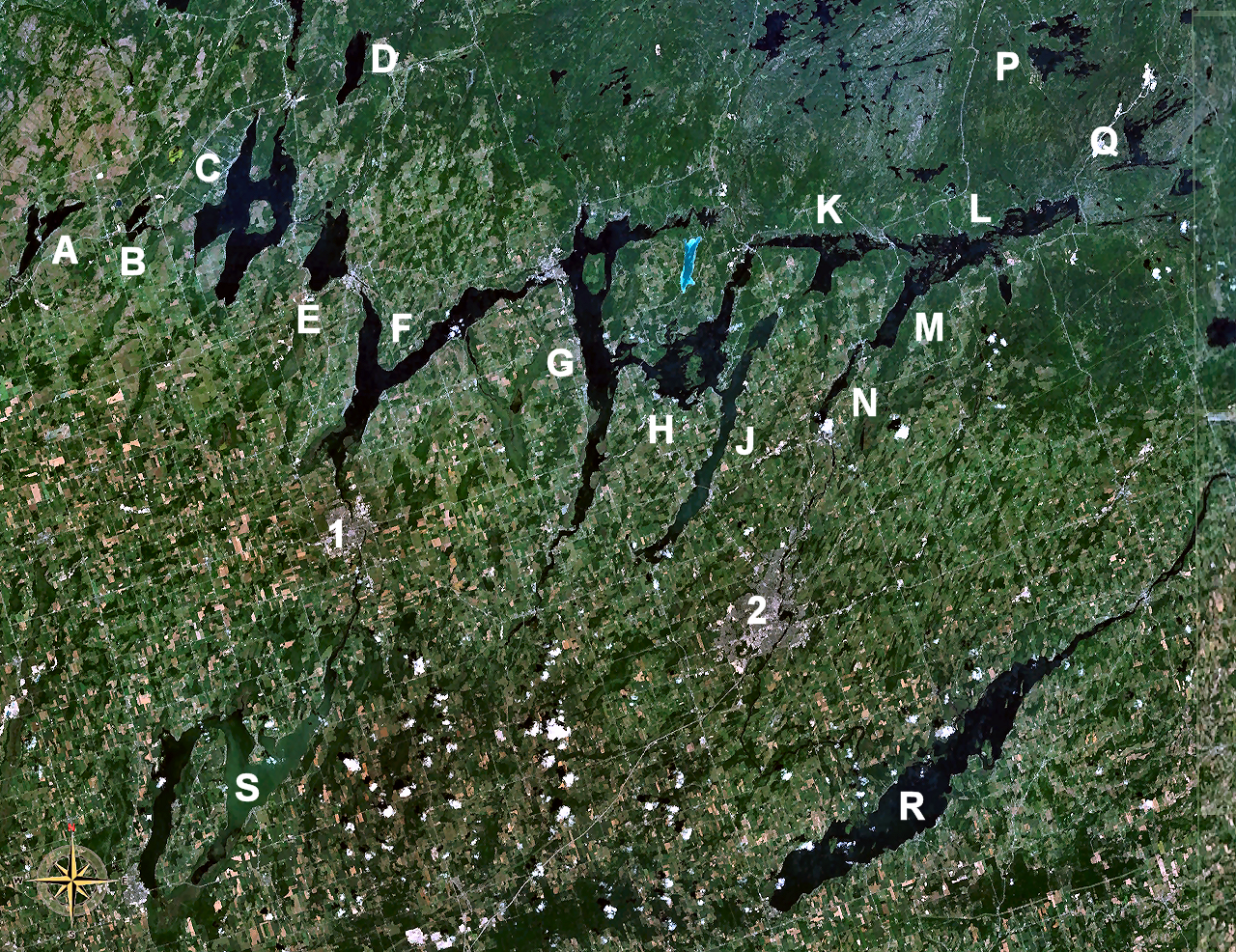
The Kawartha Lakes in Ontario formed in residual tunnel valleys from the Late Wisconsonian glacial period. The water flow was from upper right to lower left. Close examination shows the existence of buried tunnel valleys as well – they can be identified by contrasting vegetation.

Tunnel valley channels often start or stop abruptly. They have convex-up longitudinal profiles. They are often occupied by elongated lakes of underfit streams. They frequently show signs of subsequent depositions such as eskers.

=== Evidence of erosion mechanisms ===
Evidence suggests that erosion in a tunnel valley is primarily the result of water flow. They erode by meltwater, which it has been argued, episodically drains in repeated jökulhlaups from subglacial lakes and reservoirs; examples of such motion have been observed in Antarctica. Although there is evidence of ice erosion such as linear striations in the bedrock, these are observed only in the widest valleys, and are believed to have played a secondary role.

The subglacial layout of valley tunnels is predominantly oriented parallel to glacial ice flow lines – essentially they stretch from areas of thicker sheet ice toward areas of thinner sheet ice. They can exhibit reverse gradients, which result when pressurized meltwater flows over obstacles such as ridges or hills along the glacier bed.

Tunnel valleys can be formed under extremely thick glacial ice – examples have been observed on the bottom of Lake Superior and in the oceans offshore in Antarctica. The course of a tunnel valley typically runs from thickest glacial ice to the glacier margin; as a result the glacial ice pressurizes the water such that it runs uphill toward its end.

== Formation of tunnel valleys ==
Although there is agreement on the role of meltwater in creation of tunnel valleys, several theories are still under consideration for the role of that meltwater:

- Steady state theory – Boulton and Hindmarsh propose a steady state theory. They suggest tunnel valleys form in unconsolidated sediment when meltwater flows under pressure through an initially narrow subglacial conduit. With progressive removal of sediment by meltwater, ice deforms under its own weight into the cavity to create a tunnel valley through a positive feedback mechanism.
- Jökulhlaup driven erosion – Piotrowski argues that ice sheets may, in some instances, be cold-based; that is they contact land that is frozen (permafrost) and they freeze to the permafrost. Meltwater builds up behind this frozen ice terminus until it generates sufficient pressure to lift the ice and break the bond, with a catastrophic meltwater release such as is seen with the Icelandic jökulhlaup. As a consequence of this jökulhlaup a tunnel valley is formed.
- Upglacier erosion – Wingfield proposes that tunnel valleys form gradually, with the valley head cutting progressively back toward the source up-glacier during deglaciation.

Periodic outbursts of subglacial water have been observed moving subglacial water between subglacial lakes beneath the East Antarctic Ice Sheet. Satellite data recorded a subglacial discharge totaling two km^{3} (0.48 mi^{3}) traveling ~260 km (160 mi) over a period of less than a year. As the flow subsided, the weight of ice closed the tunnel and sealed the lake again. The water flow was modeled satisfactorily with channeling in ice and in sediment. The analytic model shows that over some regions, the ice-bedrock geometry included sections which would have frozen, blocking off flow, unless erosion of the sedimentary substrate was the means of creating a channel and sustaining the discharge. Hence, combining this data and analysis with Icelandic jökulhlaup observations, there is experimental evidence that some form of the jökulhlaup hypothesis with features of the steady state model is correct.

=== Common features of tunnel valley theories ===
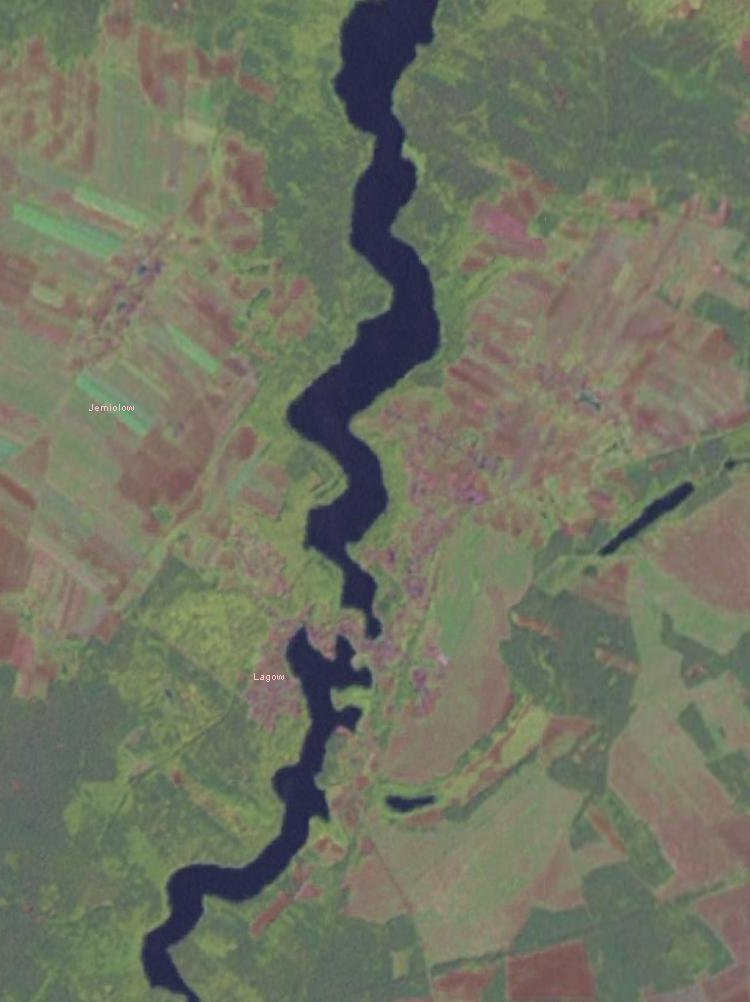
A Polish ribbon lake formed in a tunnel valley. Note the variable width and the interruption between segments of the course. There is also evidence of other sediment-filled channels adjacent to this (e.g., two smaller lakes to the right)

Subglacial meltwater flow is common to all theories; hence a key to understanding channel formation is an understanding of subglacial meltwater flow. Meltwater may be produced on the glacier surface (supraglacially), below the glacier (basally) or both. Meltwater may flow either supraglacially or basally as well; the signatures of supraglacial and basal water flow differ with the passage zone. Supraglacial flow is similar to stream flow in all surface environments – water flows from higher areas to lower areas under the influence of gravity. Basal flow exhibits significant differences. In basal flow the water, either produced by melting at the base or drawn downward from the surface by gravity, collects at the base of the glacier in ponds and lakes in a pocket overlain by hundreds of meters of ice. If there is no surface drainage path, water from surface melting will flow downward and collect in crevices in the ice, while water from basal melting will collect under the glacier; either source will form a subglacial lake. The hydraulic head of the water collected in a basal lake will increase as water drains through the ice until the pressure grows high enough to either develop a path through the ice or to float the ice above it.

=== Steady state theory ===
Sources of water and water drainage routes through and below temperate and sub-polar glaciers are reasonably well understood and provide a basis for understanding tunnel valleys. For these glaciers, supraglacial water ponds or moves in rivers across the surface of the glacier until it drops down a vertical crevice (a moulin) in the glacier. There it joins subglacial water created by geothermal heat; some portion of the water drains into aquifers below the glacier. Excess subglacial water that cannot drain through sediment or impermeable bedrock as groundwater, moves either through channels eroded into the bed of sediment below the glacier (called Nye channels) or through channels upward into the glacial ice (called Rothlisberger channels), eventually flowing out at the ice margin. On the simplest level, the tunnel valley can be considered a larger-scale version of these phenomena.

Tunnel valleys or tunnel channels are produced by meltwater flows beneath glacial ice. Tunnel valleys are often buried or partially buried by sediment accumulation during periods of ice advance and retreat.

Although attractive since it scales up the Nye channel formation which has been observed in sediments, a weakness of the steady state theory is that it requires that tunnel valleys be excavated in unconsolidated sediment, in which meltwater is initially forced through an initially narrow subglacial conduit. With progressive sediment erosion by the meltwater, ice deforms under its own weight into the cavity to creating an ever-larger tunnel valley. However the steady state theory appears not to account for erosion into bedrock, which has been extensively observed.

=== Jökulhlaup driven erosion ===
There is evidence that meltwater discharges are episodic. This can result because as water continues to collect, more ice is lifted, and the water moves outward in a growing under-ice lake. Areas where the ice is most easily lifted (i.e., areas with thinner overlying ice sheets) are lifted first. Hence the water may move up the terrain underlying the glacier if it moves toward areas of lower overlying ice. As water collects, additional ice is lifted until a release path is created.

If no preexisting channel is present, the water is initially released in a broad-front jökulhlaup which can have a flow front that is tens of kilometers wide, spreading out in a thin front. As the flow continues, it tends to erode the underlying materials and the overlying ice, creating a channel even as the reduced pressure allows most of the glacial ice to settle back to the underlying surface, sealing off the broad front release and channelizing the flow. The direction of the channel is defined primarily by the overlying ice thickness and secondarily by the gradient of the underlying earth, and may be observed to “run uphill” as the pressure of the ice forces the water to areas of lower ice coverage until it emerges at a glacial face. Hence the configuration of the various tunnel valleys formed by a specific glaciation provide a general mapping of the glacier thickness when the tunnel valleys were formed, particularly if the original surface relief under the glacier was limited.

Analyses by Piotrowski demonstrate that the annual production of water from one typical catchment of 642,000,000 m^{3} (2.27×10^{10} cu ft) would normally drain through its associated tunnel valley in less than 48 hours. The debris found in tunnels and at the mouth of tunnels tends to be coarse rocks and boulders – this is indicative of high flow velocities and an extremely erosive environment. This erosive environment is consistent with creation of tunnels over 400 m (1,300 ft) deep and 2.5 km (1.6 mi) wide, as have been observed in the Antarctic. Piotrowski's model predicts a cycle as follows:

1. Meltwater is produced as a result of geothermal heating from below. Surface ablation water is not considered as it would be minimal at the glacial maximum and evidence indicates that surface water does not penetrate more than 100 m (330 ft) into a glacier.
2. Meltwater initially drains through subglacial aquifers.
3. When the hydraulic transmissivity of the substratum is exceeded, subglacial meltwater accumulates in basins.
4. Water accumulates sufficiently to open the ice blockage in the tunnel valley which accumulated after the last discharge.
5. The tunnel valley discharges the meltwater excess – turbulent flow melts out or erodes the excess ice as well as eroding the valley floor.
6. As the water level drops, the pressure decreases until the tunnel valleys again close with ice and water flow ceases.

=== Post-erosion infill processes ===
Tunnel valleys have similar characteristics, irrespective of whether they are formed on land or in a submerged environment. This is because they are formed by high pressure water under a thick ice sheet – in a submerged environment they still have sufficient pressure to erode tunnel valleys into configurations comparable to those generated on land.

Tunnel valleys may remain open, partially filled or filled, as a function of the glacial recession. The filled configuration is significant because filled tunnel valleys become excellent reservoirs for either water (aquifer) or for oil. This results since relatively coarse-grained sandstones are located on the valley floors and valley margins and valley floor because the coarser-grained sediments settle out more easily and accumulate preferentially in the flowing water common to the tunnel valley fill stages.

The subglacial tunnel valley networks originally formed near the ice margin. Tunnel valleys are likely to fill with sediment as the result of meltwater release during glacial recession. Tunnel valleys fill in two main ways. In the first instance, debris carried by flow settles out and accumulates in the tunnel valley. Subsequently, once the ice has retreated sufficiently, marine deposits may be laid down, depending on the water depth at the ice front.

The tunnel valley sedimentary record is controlled by meltwater release flow rates and sediment burdens during glacial recession. The sediment found in the tunnel valley provides insight into whether it was laid down in a tidal environment, a transitional environment, or an essentially dry environment with good drainage. In the glaciomarine environment, glacially-related deposits are interbedded with to those similar to those on non-glaciated tidal areas; the tidal environment will show undertow dominated fans. The transitional environment is characterized by both mixed marine and fresh water life in a delta environment. In an essentially dry environment, the glacial flow carries sediment which accumulates much as it would in any stream bed.

=== Large-scale structure ===
Ice flow within glaciers results from an increase in the surface slope of the glacier, which result from geographic features combined with an imbalance between the amounts of ice accumulated through precipitation and lost through ablation. The increased gradient increases the shear stress on a glacier until it begins to flow. The flow velocity and deformation are also affected by the slope of the ice, the ice thickness and temperature.

Punkari identified that continental ice sheets typically flow in fan-shaped lobes, which converge from separate sources and move at differing speeds. Lobes are separated by interlobate zones, which have thinner ice coverage. Water collects in this interlobate area. The hydraulic head (pressure) is lower in areas of thinner ice; hence subglacial water tends to converge on the interlobate joint. The separate lobes move at different speeds, generating friction at the ice boundary; the heat released melts ice to release additional water. The surface of the interlobate area is crevassed, allowing surface meltwater, which runs down the ice surface to the lower area, to penetrate into the ice. As a result, the ice-flow patterns and the debris accumulation are different in interlobate zones. Specifically, tunnel valleys and eskers indicate water flow toward the interlobate zones, which are elevated as the result of debris carried and deposited there.

== Geographic distribution ==
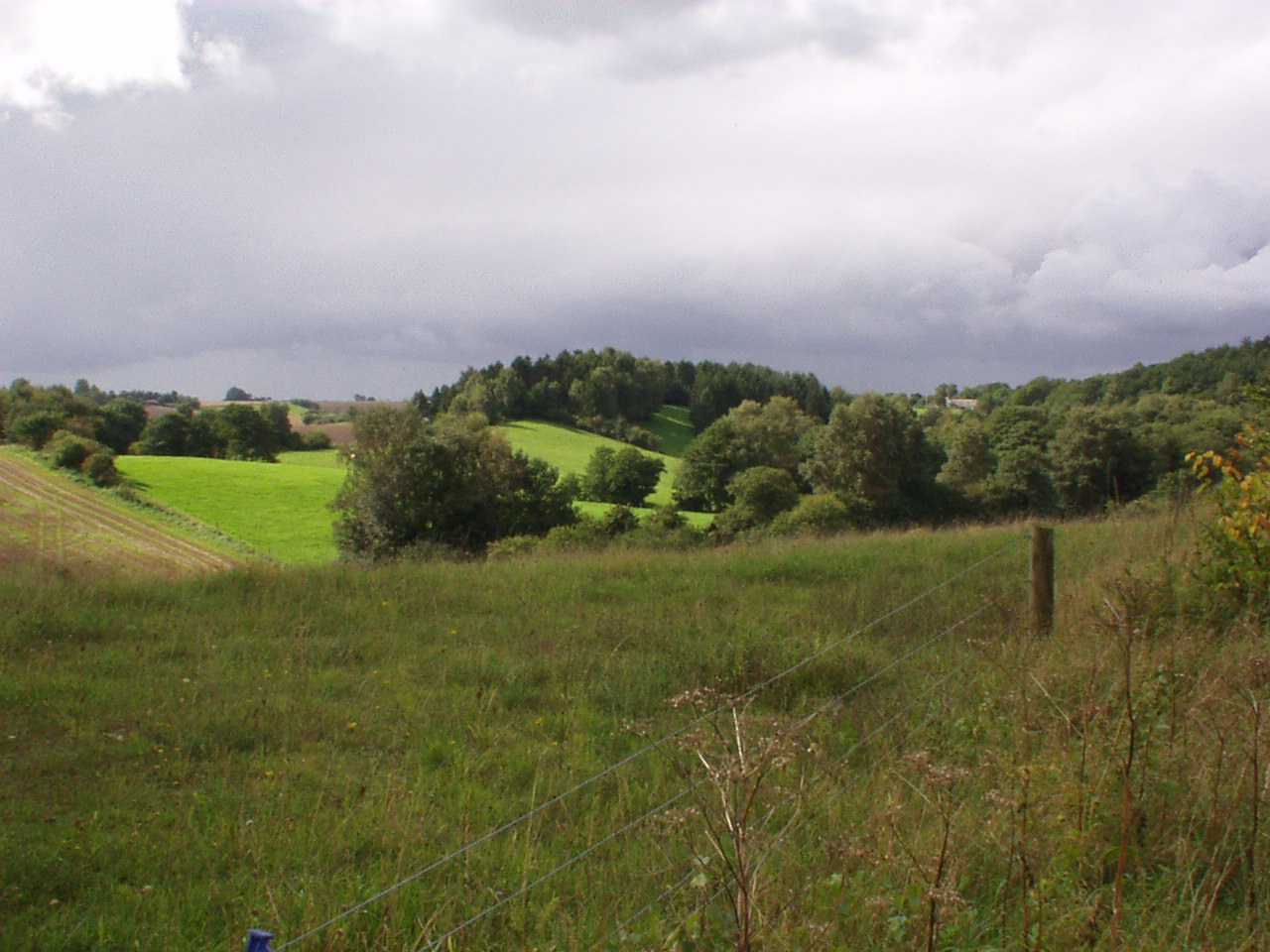
Tunnel valley landscape from the island Zealand in Denmark.

Glacially formed tunnel valleys have been identified on every continent.

=== Africa ===
Tunnel valleys associated with the Late Ordovician glaciation have been observed in north African countries, including Libya. These large-scale channel-fill sandstone bodies (tunnel valleys) are a striking sedimentological feature of the glacially related deposits on the old North Gondwanaland margin. They range from 10–200 m (33–656 ft) in depth, and 500–3,000 m (1,600–9,800 ft) wide. The tunnel valleys are incised into the bedrock and can be traced for 2–30 km (1.2–18.6 mi) in length. In one example, in Mauritania, in the western Sahara, Late Ordovician siliciclastic glacial features and deposits on the North Gondwana continental shelf include incised channels identified as tunnel valleys. The filled tunnel valley are several kilometers long and several hundred meters wide. Reconstructions conclude that these structures were located in glacier ice-margin regions; the cross-sections of the valleys are comparable to those confirmed to have formed glacially, the valleys end in outwash fans similar to tunnel valleys, and the infill is post-glacial typical of that observed for tunnel valleys.

In southern Africa a Permo-Carboniferous tunnel valley system has been identified in northern Cape Province, South Africa.

=== Antarctica ===
The active formation of tunnel valleys is observed in the present period beneath the Antarctic ice.

=== Asia ===
During the late Ordovician, eastern Gondwana was covered with ice sheets. As a consequence, Jordan and Saudi Arabia exhibit regionally-extensive filled tunnel valley structures.

=== Australia ===
Open-pit gold mines near Kalgoorlie, Western Australia, expose an extensive network of glacially-eroded valleys filled with tillite and shale cut below the Late Paleozoic Pilbara ice sheet.

=== Europe ===
Tunnel valleys and related glacial impacts have been identified in Russia, Belarus, Ukraine, Poland, Germany, Northern France, the Netherlands, Belgium, Great Britain, Finland, Sweden, Denmark and Norway. They have been studied in detail in Denmark, north Germany and north Poland where the thick ice sheet of the Weichsel and earlier Glaciations, having flowed down from the mountains of Scandinavia, began to rise up the north-European slope, driven by the altitude of the glacial ice accumulation over Scandinavia. Their alignment indicates the direction of ice flow at the time of their formation. They are found extensively in the United Kingdom with several examples reported from Cheshire for example. They are also to be found under the North Sea.

Examples of lakes formed in tunnel valleys include the Ruppiner See (a lake in Ostprignitz-Ruppin, Brandenburg), the Werbellinsee, and the Schwielochsee, all in Germany.

=== North America ===
Okanagan Lake is a large, deep ribbon lake in the Okanagan Valley of British Columbia which formed in a tunnel valley from the Okanogan lobe of the Cordilleran Ice Sheet. The lake is 135 km (84 mi) long, between 4 and 5 km (2.5 and 3.1 mi) wide, and has a surface area of 351 km^{2} (136 mi^{2}). Northern Idaho and Montana show evidence of tunnel valley formation under the Purcell lobe and the Flathead Lobe of the Cordilleran Ice Sheet. Tunnel valleys in southeast Alberta form an interconnected, anabranching network comprising Sage Creek, the Lost River and the Milk River and generally drain southeast.

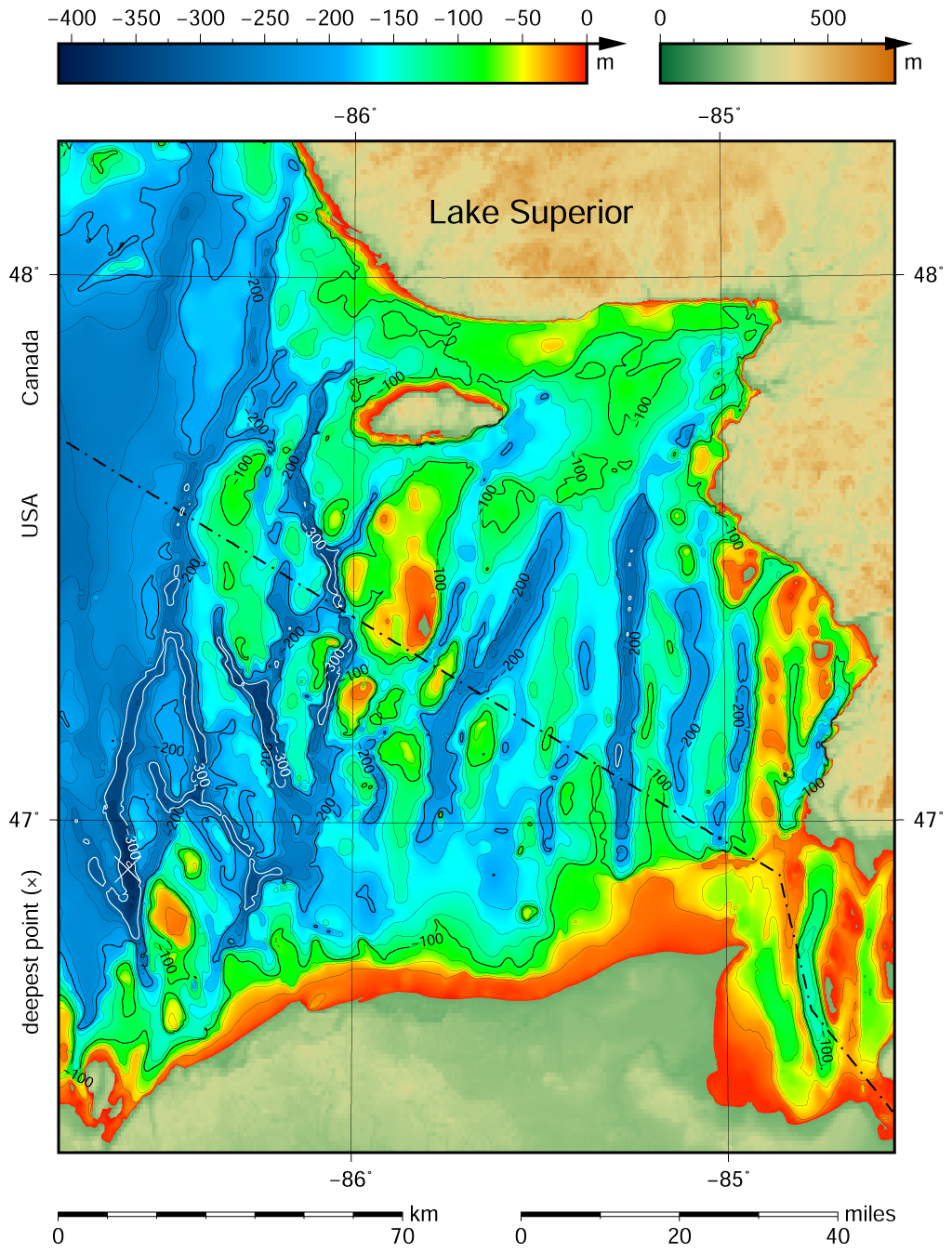
Eastern part of Lake Superior bathymetric map. The submerged valleys may have originated as tunnel valleys.

Tunnel valleys have been observed in Minnesota, Wisconsin and Michigan at the margins of the Laurentide Ice Sheet. Examples of bedrock tunnel valleys in Minnesota include River Warren Falls and several valleys which lie deep beneath till deposited by the glaciers which created them, but can be traced in many places by the Chain of Lakes in Minneapolis and lakes and dry valleys in St. Paul.

The Kawartha Lakes of Ontario formed in the Late Wisconsinan glacial period. Ice melt from the Niagara Escarpment flowed through tunnel valleys beneath the ice expanded to form a west-to-east passage between the main Laurentide Ice Sheet and a mass of ice in the Lake Ontario basin.

Cedar Creek Canyon is a tunnel valley located in Allen County, Indiana. It is a very straight, narrow gorge about 50 to 100 ft (15 to 30 m) deep that contains part of the lower segment of Cedar Creek, the largest tributary of the St. Joseph River.

In the Laurentian Channel offshore eastern Canada, numerous tunnel valleys have been identified originating from the submerged valley of the St. Lawrence River, which is also of glacial origin. Seismic reflection profiles of the fill of tunnel valleys suggest that they are of various ages, with the youngest dating from shortly after the Late Glacial Maximum. They result from erosion by sub-glacial water crossing the eastern Scotian Shelf off Nova Scotia. They originate from the Laurentian Channel south of the Cabot Strait. Additionally, seismic profiles show deeply buried post-Miocene channels, some of which lie 1,100 m (3,600 ft) below modern sea level, cutting across the eastern part of the outer Laurentian Channel which have also tentatively been determined to be tunnel valleys. Seismic profiles have also mapped large tunnel valleys on Banquereau Bank and Sable Island Bank.

=== South America ===
The Perito Moreno Glacier is located in the southern Southern Patagonian Ice Field, terminating in Lake Argentino. It divides Lake Argentino into the Los Témpanos channel, and the Rico branch, blocking the channel and forming an ice dam. Lake Argentino periodically breaks through in outburst floods with drainage initially through a tunnel with subsequent roof collapse to form an open channel.

== Temporal distribution ==
There have been five known ice ages in the Earth's history; the Earth is experiencing the Quaternary Ice Age during the present time. Tunnel valleys formed during four of the five have been identified.

Name	Period (Ma)	Period	Era	Tunnel valleys and tunnel valley formation extensively observed
Quaternary	2.58 – Present	Neogene	Cenozoic	Tunnel valleys formation has been reported in northern Asia, Europe, North America, and Antarctica
Karoo	360–260	Carboniferous and Permian	Paleozoic	Tunnel valleys has been reported in the Carboniferous–Permian glacial record of Australia and of South Africa.
Andean-Saharan	450–420	Ordovician and Silurian	Paleozoic	Tunnel valleys have been reported in Jordan, Saudi Arabia, Mauritania, Mali, Morocco, Algeria, Libya, Tunisia, Niger, Chad, and Sudan.
Cryogenian (or Sturtian-Varangian)	800–635	Cryogenian	Neoproterozoic	Tunnel valleys have been reported in the Cryogenian strata of Oman and Mauritania.
Huronian	2100–2400	Siderian and Rhyacian	Paleoproterozoic	

== See also ==
- Ledoyom
- Moulin (geomorphology)
