= Cedar Creek (Indiana) =

Coordinates: 41°27′51″N 85°10′11″W

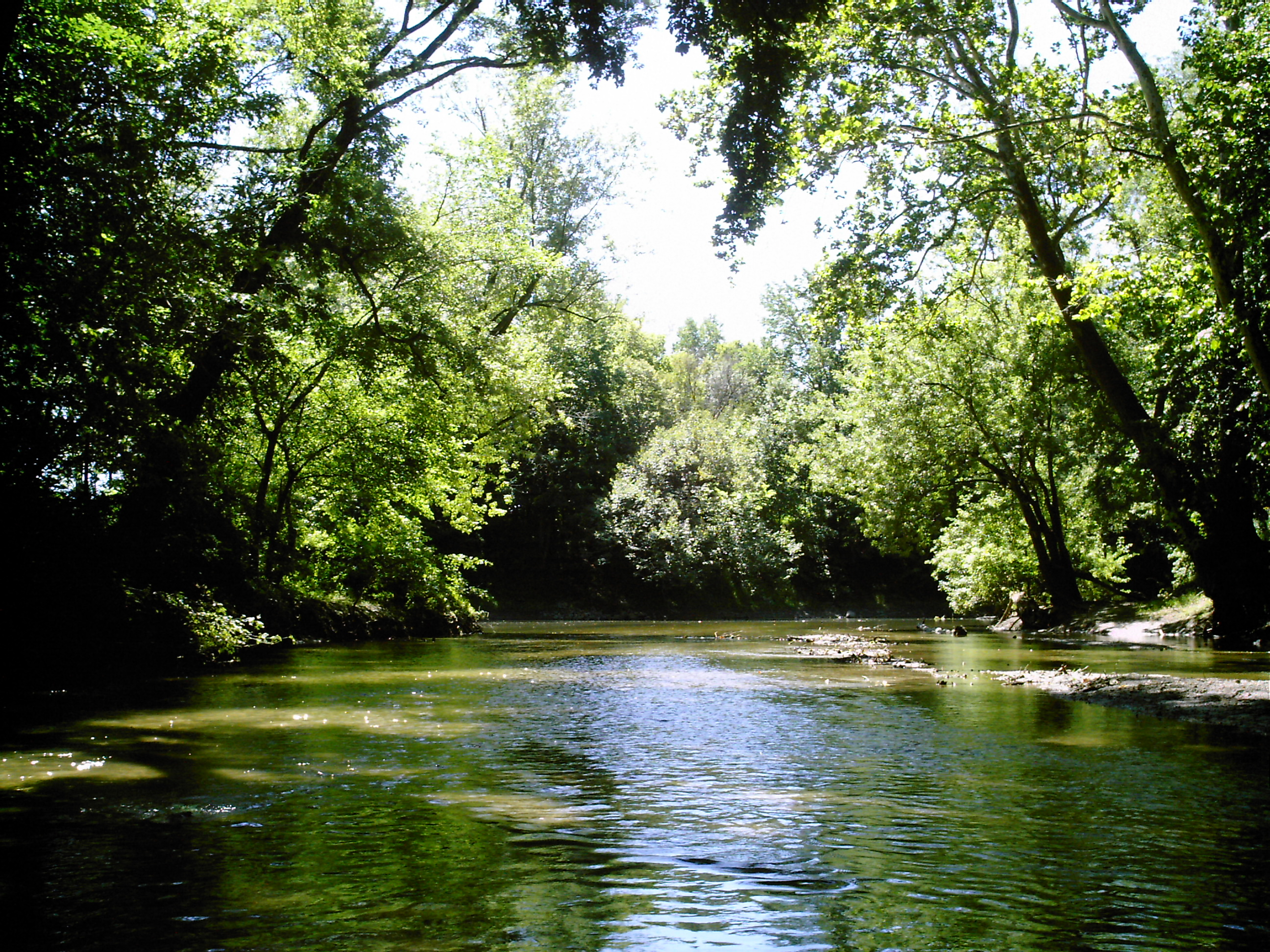
Cedar Creek near the confluence with the St. Joseph River

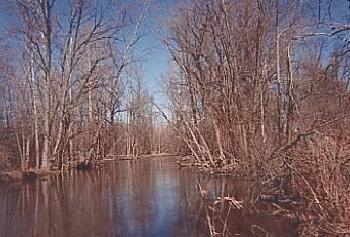
Cedar Creek: Scenic River Segment

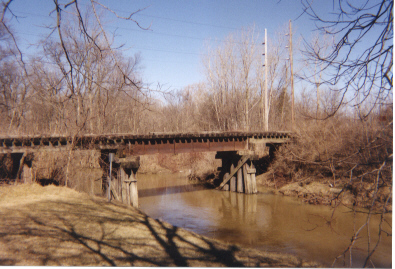
Abandoned Vandalia Railroad bridge over a channelized portion of Cedar Creek in Auburn, February 2001.

Cedar Creek (from Potawatomi: mskwawak-zibə) is the largest tributary of the St. Joseph River, draining 174,780 acres (707.3 km^{2}) in the Eastern Corn Belt Plains of northeastern Indiana. It is 31.9 miles (51.3 km) long, rising in northwestern DeKalb County and joining the St. Joseph just below the Cedarville Dam in Allen County.

== Origins and history ==
Upper Cedar Creek originated as an ice-marginal channel at the western edge of the Erie Lobe of the Wisconsin Glacier and formed a single stream with the southwest-flowing Eel River which connected to the Wabash River. Lower Cedar Creek was a tributary of the ancestral Eel, carrying glacial meltwater under the ice through a tunnel valley known today as Cedar Creek Canyon. Blockage of the Eel's channel by outwash from the canyon and a decline in the volume of meltwater caused lower Cedar Creek to reverse its flow. In so doing, it captured the flow of the upper Eel, a classic example of stream piracy that shifted Cedar Creek's drainage (about 175,000 acres) from the Eel-Wabash system to that of the St. Joseph-Maumee.

Once a meandering stream, upper Cedar Creek was channelized (straightened and deepened) in the early 20th century for agricultural and urban drainage, which has increased the watershed's vulnerability to erosion and contaminated runoff. Once home to 27 species of freshwater mussel, Cedar Creek has experienced a drastic decline in mussel population since the 1980s.

== Course ==
Cedar Creek originates at Indian Lake (41º27'51" N 85º10'11" W), northwest of Corunna, Indiana, and comes into formal existence downstream at Cedar Lake. Its DeKalb County section flows east-southeast from Indian Lake, loops around Waterloo, passes through Auburn, then angles southwest until it enters Allen County, where it is crossed by Indiana State Road 327 south of Garrett before turning back to the southeast toward Leo-Cedarville.

Lower Cedar Creek, from river mile 13.7 to its confluence with the St. Joseph, is officially designated as an "Outstanding State Resource Water" and is one of three streams in Indiana's Natural, Scenic and Recreational Rivers system.

== Tributaries ==
- (left) Willow Creek
  - (left) Kell Ditch
  - (left) Willow Creek Ditch
    - (left) Willow Creek Branch
    - (right) Hatch Ditch
  - (right) Krumlauf Branch
- (left) Yant Ditch
  - White Lake
    - Wappes Ditch
    - (left) Clark Chapman Ditch
      - Fulk Lake
- (left) Little Cedar Creek
  - (left) Black Creek
    - (left) Bilger Ditch
      - (right) Whan Ditch
      - Roudy Lake
        - Mud Lake
  - (left) Hinkley Ditch
  - (left) outflow from King Lake
  - (left) Yarde Ditch
  - (left) Sycamore Creek
- (right) Schmadel Ditch
- (right) Dosch Ditch
- (left) Garrett City Ditch
- (left) Diehl Ditch
  - (right) Peckhart Ditch
    - (left) Ober Ditch
- (right) W Smith Ditch
- (right) Matson Ditch
- (left) Swartz Ditch
- (right) Dibbling Ditch
- Cedar Lake
  - Leins Ditch
    - (left) McCullough Ditch
    - Indian Lake

== See also ==
- List of rivers of Indiana
