= Ice shelf basal channels =

Type of subglacial channel

An ice shelf basal channel is a type of subglacial meltwater channel that forms on the underside of floating ice shelves connected to ice sheets. Basal channels are generally rounded cavities that form parallel to ice sheet flow. These channels are found mainly around the Greenland and Antarctic ice sheets in places with relatively warm ocean water. West Antarctica in particular has the highest density of basal channels in the world. Basal channels can be tens of kilometers long, kilometers wide, and incise hundreds of meters up into an ice shelf. These channels can evolve and grow just as rapidly as ice shelves can, with some channels having incision rates approaching 22 meters per year. Basal channels are categorized based on what mechanisms created them and where they formed.

Basal channels can affect an ice shelf's surface and basal topography. Larger basal channels with widths greater than 1 kilometer that incise more than 50 meters into an ice shelf can produce surface channels large enough to be detected by satellites. Basal channels also produce surface and basal crevassing. By creating features such as basal and surface crevasses and also thinning ice shelves, basal channels can destabilize ice shelves and contribute to ice sheet mass loss.

== Categories ==
Basal channels are distributed into three main categories by how and where they are formed relative to an ice shelf's grounding line: ocean-sourced channels, subglacially-sourced channels, and grounding-line sourced channels. The grounding line is the point where an ice sheet or glacier meets the ocean and begins floating, forming an ice shelf. Features that could be basal channels but cannot be identified without further information form a fourth category known as possible channels.

=== Ocean-sourced channels ===
Basal channels that do not intersect with an ice shelf's grounding line are known as ocean-sourced channels. While some basal channels are formed from basal meltwater from an ice sheet, these channels are disconnected from the ice shelf grounding and must be formed via ocean processes. Relatively warm ocean water rises to the base of an ice shelf, whether due to a bump in the underlying topography or due to it having a higher buoyancy, and melts the underside of an ice shelf. This warm water is generally driven by ocean currents. Ocean-sourced channels become deeper further away from their source in the direction of flow (down-glacier).

=== Subglacially-sourced channels ===
The beginning of a subglacially-sourced channel lies directly on the grounding line. These channels are formed by subglacial meltwater rather than purely ocean processes and tend to form on ice shelves where mass loss via subglacial melting exceeds loss from calving. Calving is when a glacier, ice sheet, or ice shelf loses mass via chunks of ice breaking off into the ocean and forming icebergs. Subglacially-sourced channels form when buoyant meltwater from an ice sheet or glacier reaches the grounding lines and interacts with the surrounding ocean. The buoyant meltwater rises, melting the overlying ice and forming a channel. Unlike ocean-sourced channels, these channels are at their deepest directly at the grounding line.

=== Grounding-line-sourced channels ===
Grounding-line-sourced channels are similar to subglacially-sourced channels in that they intersect an ice shelf's grounding line. These channels differ in that they do not form from subglacial meltwater and instead form in locations where there is likely little to no subglacial meltwater. Grounding-line-sourced channels share a number of characteristics with ocean-sourced channels. They are both formed by ocean processes and deepen down-glacier.

== Instability due to basal channels ==
=== Ice shelf thinning ===
When basal channels incise up into an ice shelf, they produce localized, enhanced thinning in that region. When basal melting occurs on an ice shelf, the surface of the shelf lowers to compensate for the change in mass. Studies have shown that thinning rates along a basal channel can be up to triple an ice shelf's average thinning rate. These thin regions are weaker than the rest of the ice shelf and are more prone to instability. Warmer ocean waters caused by climate change have been linked to increased basal channel formation and subsequent ice shelf thinning.

=== Crevasse formation ===
Basal channels can lead to thinning and surface depressions, changing the stress distribution of an ice shelf by creating regions of extension and compression. Regions of extension are particularly vulnerable to both surface and basal fracturing. Fracturing effectively creates cracks in the ice which can vary greatly in size. Basal channels tend to form surface fractures parallel to glacier flow direction. When surface meltwater flows into fractures, the higher density of the water compared to ice can increase the size of the crevasse in a process known as hydrofracturing. This can cause calving events and further destabilize ice shelves. At present, most Antarctic ice flow and mass loss models do not account for mass loss due to hydrofracture.
