= Cedar Creek Canyon =

Cedar Creek Canyon may refer to:

- Cedar Creek Canyon (Arkansas), in the Petit Jean State Park
- Cedar Creek Canyon (Indiana), a glacial tunnel valley near Fort Wayne, Indiana
