= Cedar Creek Canyon (Indiana) =

Coordinates: 41°14′N 85°05′W

Cedar Creek Canyon, also called simply Cedar Canyon, is a topographical feature located in Allen County, Indiana, United States. It is a very straight, narrow gorge about 50 to 100 feet (15 to 30 m) deep that contains part of the lower segment of Cedar Creek, the largest tributary of the St. Joseph River. The canyon originated at the end of the last ice age as a tunnel valley, a channel under the Erie Lobe of the Wisconsin Glacier that discharged meltwater under considerable pressure into the ancestral Eel River, a tributary of the Wabash River. Cutting through the north limb of the Wabash Moraine, a debris deposit left by the retreating ice, the discharge left a large outwash fan that blocked the Eel, diverting its upper portion into the canyon in a classic example of stream piracy that formed today's Cedar Creek. This was part of a general drainage reversal that occurred in northeastern Indiana as the Maumee River opened and captured drainage that was previously part of the watershed of the Wabash. While the lower Eel remained a tributary of the Wabash, 175,000 acres (710 km^{2}) that it formerly drained became part of the Maumee watershed.

The flow reversal in lower Cedar Creek was probably accelerated by the downcutting of the St. Joseph River, which increased the velocity of its tributaries, causing them to erode toward their headwaters (headward erosion). One of these tributaries east of the tunnel valley probably became the downstream portion of Cedar Creek, later capturing flow from the valley itself and then, finally, the entire upstream segment of the ancestral Eel.

Today's Cedar Creek Canyon is a picturesque, forested area just north of Fort Wayne that includes both upland and floodplain environments. The portion of Cedar Creek that flows through it, from river mile 13.7 to the creek's confluence with the St. Joseph is officially designated as an "Outstanding State Resource Water" and is one of four streams in Indiana's Natural, Scenic and Recreational Rivers system. The Vandolah Nature Preserve, owned by ACRES Land Trust, Inc., includes parts of the canyon. The nearby Bicentennial Woods Nature Preserve has terrain features similar to the canyon, as it contains a relatively large tributary of Cedar Creek. The river has several Geocaches along the banks.
