= Fluvioglacial landform =

Landform shaped by erosion and deposition from glacial meltwater

Fluvioglacial landforms or glaciofluvial landforms (Note: "Fluvio" refers to things related to rivers and "glacial" refers to something that is of ice.) are those that result from the associated erosion and deposition of sediments caused by glacial meltwater. Glaciers contain suspended sediment loads, much of which is initially picked up from the underlying landmass. Landforms are shaped by glacial erosion through processes such as glacial quarrying, abrasion, and meltwater. Glacial meltwater contributes to the erosion of bedrock through both mechanical and chemical processes. Fluvio-glacial processes can occur on the surface and within the glacier. The deposits that happen within the glacier are revealed after the entire glacier melts or partially retreats. Fluvio-glacial landforms and erosional surfaces include: outwash plains, kames, kame terraces, kettle holes, eskers, varves, and proglacial lakes.

Meltwater streams and formed by glaciers, especially in warmer seasons. Supra-glacial streams, those above the glacial surface, and subglacial streams, those beneath the glacial surface. At the interface of the glacier and the underlying land surface, the immense weight of the glacier causes ice to melt and produces subglacial meltwater streams. These streams under immense pressure and at high velocities along with the overlying weight of the glacier itself are able to carve into landscapes and pluck sediment from the ground. This sediment is transported as the glacier advances. In warmer seasons, the glacier diminishes and retreats. This process leaves behind dropped sediment in the form of depositional landforms. The two processes of advancement and retreat have the power to transform a landscape and leave behind a series of landforms that give great insight into past glacial presence and behavior. Landforms that result from these processes include moraines, kames, kettles, eskers, drumlins, plains, and proglacial lakes.

== Deposits ==
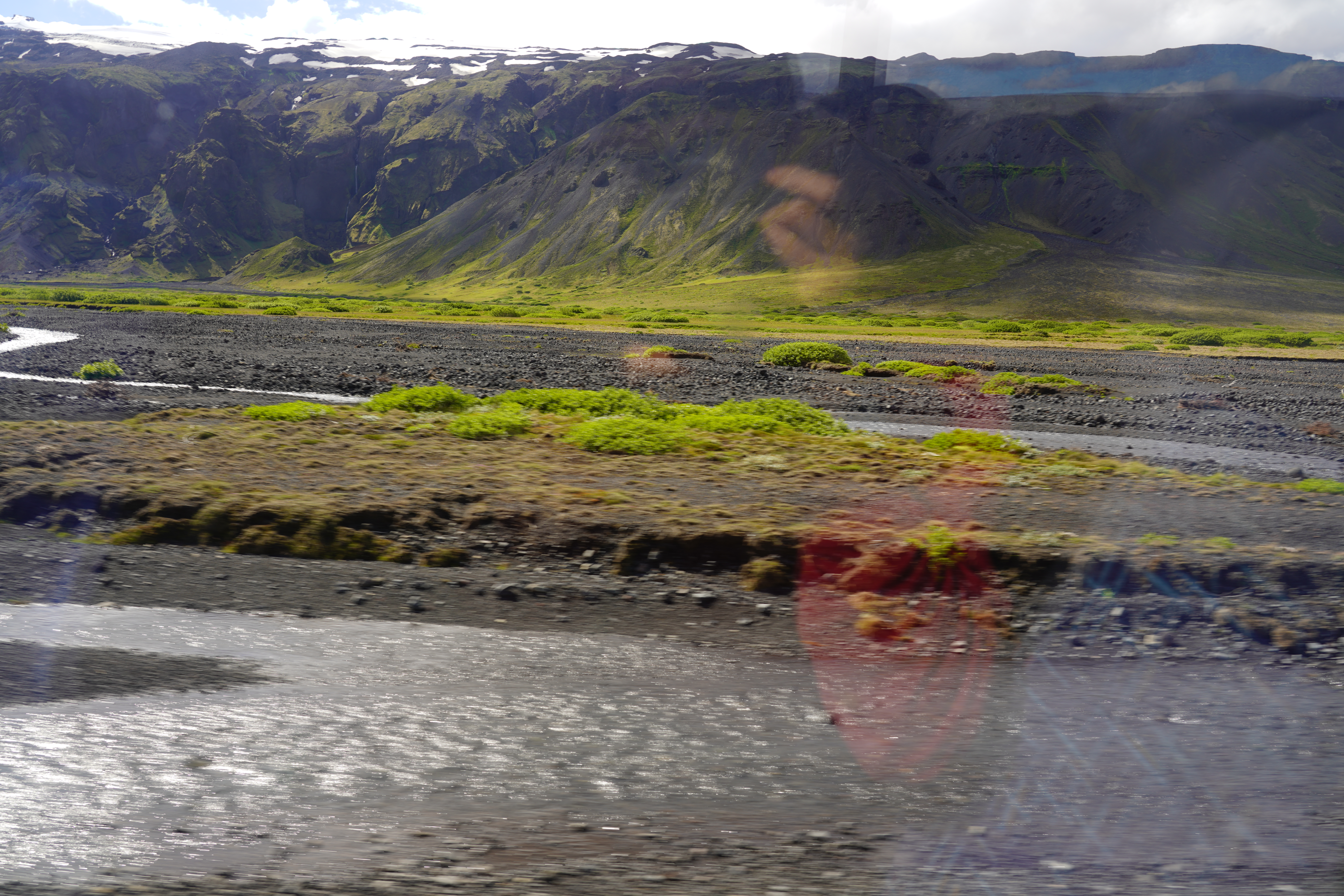
Thórsmörk glacial outwash plain

Glaciofluvial deposits or Glacio-fluvial sediments consist of boulders, gravel, sand, silt and clay from ice sheets or glaciers. They are transported, sorted and deposited by streams of water. The deposits are formed beside, below or downstream from the ice. They include kames, kame terraces and eskers formed in ice contact and outwash fans and outwash plains below the ice margin. Typically the outwash sediment is carried by fast and turbulent fluvio-glacial meltwater streams, but occasionally it is carried by catastrophic outburst floods. Larger elements such as boulders and gravel are deposited nearer to the ice margin, while finer elements are carried farther, sometimes into lakes or the ocean. The sediments are sorted by fluvial processes. They differ from glacial till, which is moved and deposited by the ice of the glacier, and is unsorted.

=== Ice-contact deposits ===
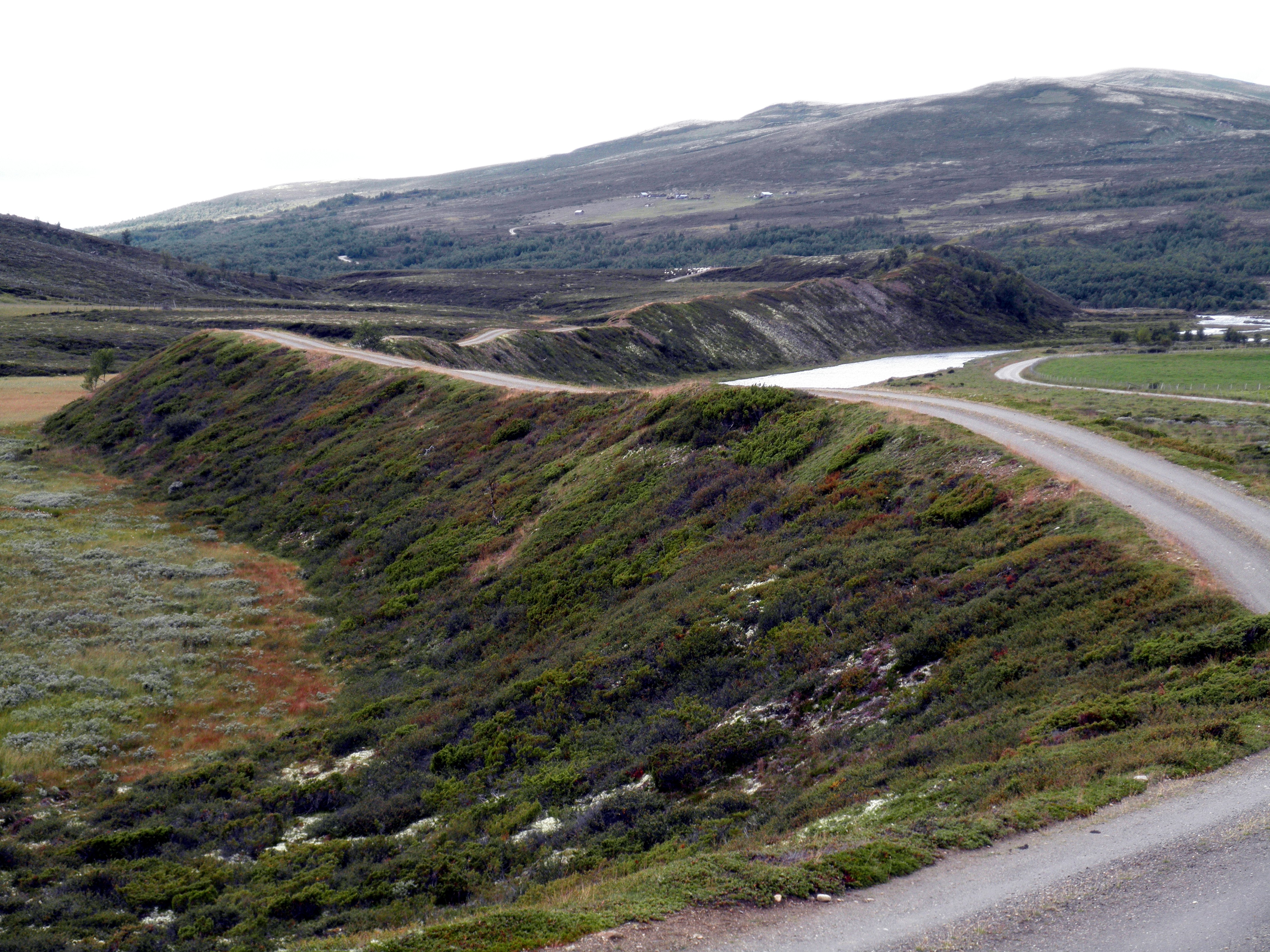
Esker in Einunndalsranden naturreservat, Hedmark, Norway

A subglacial megaflood may cut cavities into the base of the ice. As the flood dies down, sediment is deposited into these cavities to form cavity-fill drumlins in cavities aligned with the flow, ribbed terrain in cavities that cross the flow and hummocky terrain elsewhere. Low, straight ridges as much as 10 metres (33 ft) high may be formed where sediment fills in crevasses within the glacier or at its base.

A kame is a short mound or ridge with steep sides of sands and gravels deposited from melted ice. Kames may be isolated or formed in groups. Some are formed at the base of a glacier by meltwater flowing down from the surface of the ice in a moulin, or from a water body within the glacier. Others are formed at the margin of the ice as small deltas. Kame terraces are benches of sand and gravel that were deposited by braided rivers flowing between the side of the valley and the glacier's ice margin. Kame terraces on opposite sides of a valley glacier may be at different elevations.

Sometimes stratified drift is deposited in the tunnels that run through or below the glacier. When the ice melts the drift is exposed as long, linear ridges of gravel called eskers. Some eskers formed in the Pleistocene ice sheets are several hundred kilometers long. Generally they range in length from a few hundred meters to a few kilometers.

Ice contact deposits, including kames, kame plateaus and eskers, mostly consist of sand and gravel but may include beds of diamicton, silt and clay. Kames and kame plateaus usually have bases of laminated muds, and higher up have layers of increasingly coarse sands topped with gravel.

=== Outwash streams ===
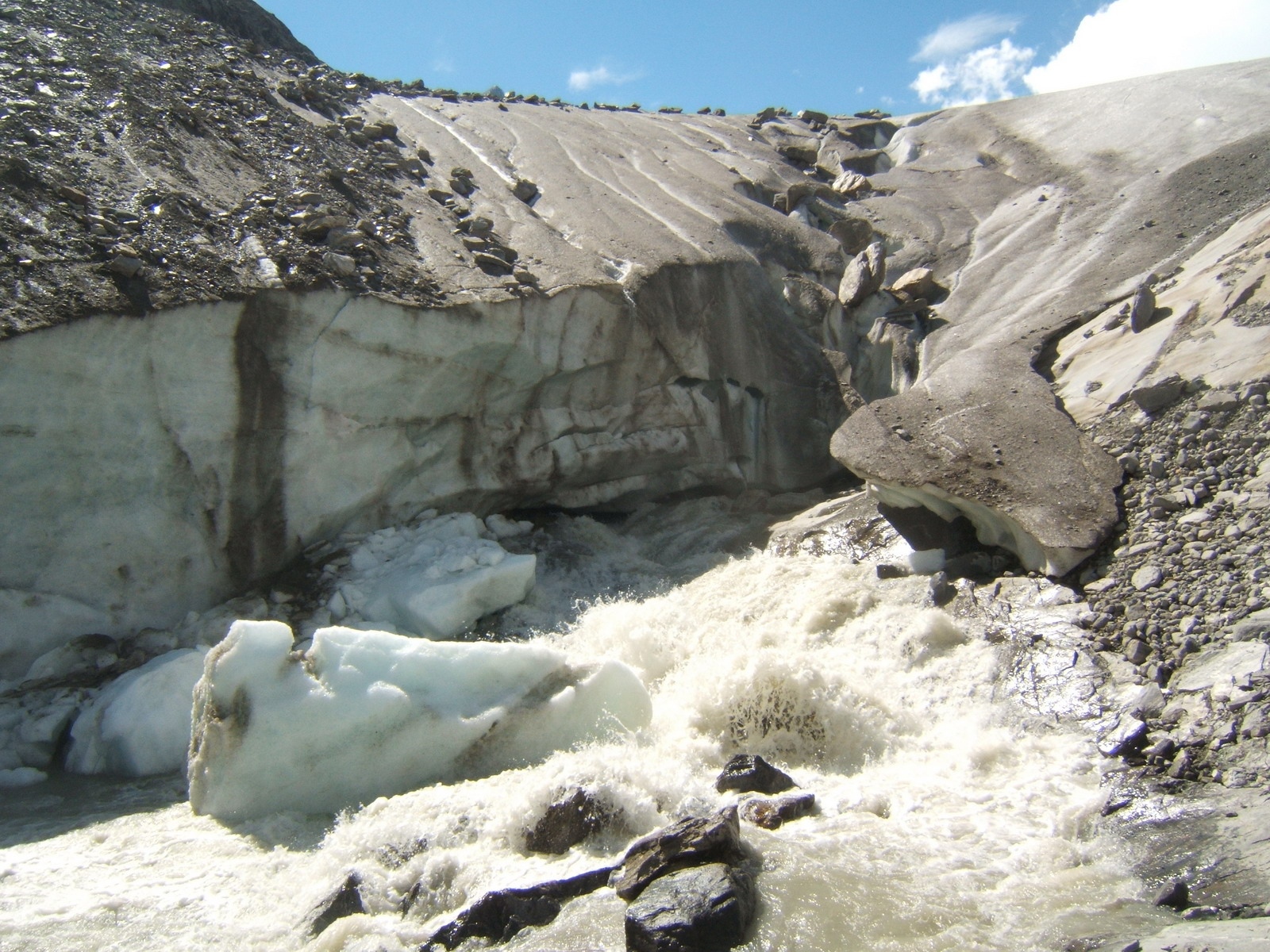
Mouth of the Schlatenkees glacier in Austria

Glaciofluvial deposits are formed by outwash streams which flow through tunnels within or beneath a glacier. The water mainly comes from melting, and may also come from rainfall or from run-off from ice-free slopes beside the glacier. The streams have highly variable rates of flow depending on temperature, which in turn depends on the season, time of day and cloud cover. At times of high flow, the streams are under pressure. Streams below the glacier may flow upslope, driven by pressure.

The turbulent and fast-moving meltwater streams cause mechanical erosion through hydraulic action, cavitation and abrasion. They may also dissolve and remove soluble chemicals from the abraded bedrock and debris below the glacier. The streams pick up debris from below the glacier, and debris washed in from higher land beside the glacier. Usually they hold as much debris as they can carry when they leave the glacier.

The large daily fluctuations in discharge affect sediment motion. The sediment is picked up and carried as the discharge rises, then deposited as discharge falls. Usually much of the sediment rolls or slides near the bed of the stream. During the highest discharge periods large boulders may be set in motion. There may also be high concentrations of suspended sediment in early summer, when discharge is highest. Lakes or reservoirs below, within, on or beside the glacier may release massive outburst floods known as jökulhlaups.

=== Outwash deposits ===
Landforms associated with a receding glacier

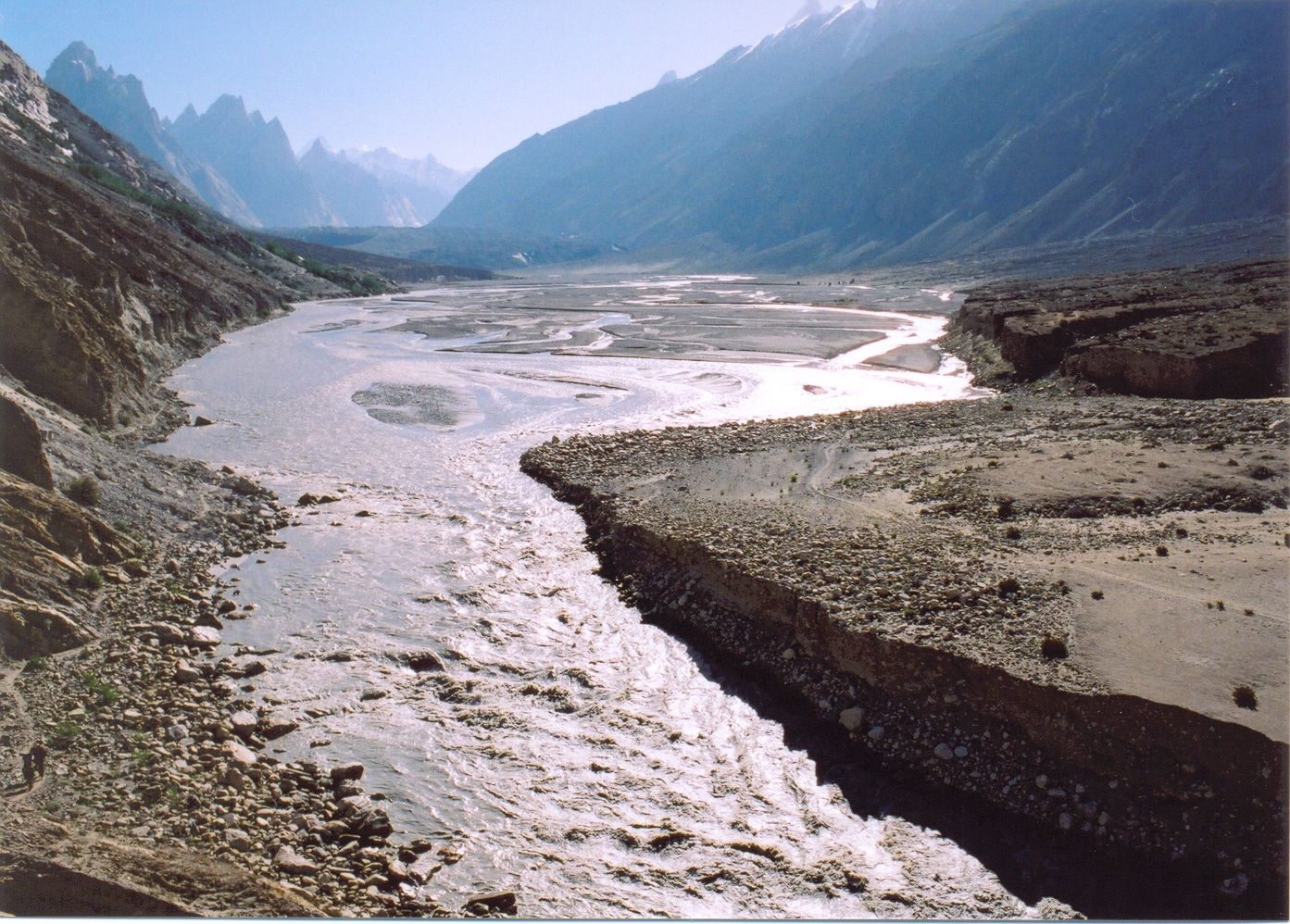
Braldu River below the Baltoro Glacier in Pakistan

After emerging from its ice tunnel a meltwater stream spreads out and slows down, depositing debris. The channels become choked and the stream has to find new routes, which may result in a braided stream with channels separated by bars of gravel or sand. The channel of the braided streams are very unstable due to high loads of sediment, fluctuations in discharge and lack of plants to anchor the banks. The amount of material deposited is generally greatest near the end of the glacier, so the sediment will tend to slope down and thin out from that point.

Outwash fans are deposits of sediment that fan out from the meltwater portal, with progressively finer sediment at greater distances from the portal. Fans may be deposited on land or in water. A line of adjacent outwash fans from an ice sheet may form a ridge, or glaciofluvial moraine. When many outwash streams flow from the ice front into a lowland area they form a broad sandur, or outwash plain. A sandar may hold deposits that are tens of meters thick. In mountainous regions the outwash streams are confined by valley sides and deposit thick layers of sediment in linear outwash plains called valley trains. Terraces are formed when the streams grade down to lower levels and abandon higher and older outwash plains.

The sediment is deposited in bedforms ranging in scale from sand ripples a few centimeters across to gravel bars several hundred meters long. The sedimentary structures such as bedding, cross-bedding and clast imbrication are similar to those created by other types of stream. Near the glacier the outwash plain is composed of long bars of coarse gravel with very variable grain size, with a few large channels between the bars. Further away there are transverse bars and a web of many braided channels. The sediment now includes gravel and sand, and the grains are rounder due to sorting and abrasion. Yet further away, as non-glacial streams join the outwash streams the flow forms shallow braided channels or meandering streams and deposits sand. Glaciofluvial streams dominated by annual ice melting events may merge into a normal fluvial environment where non-glacial inflows are more important.

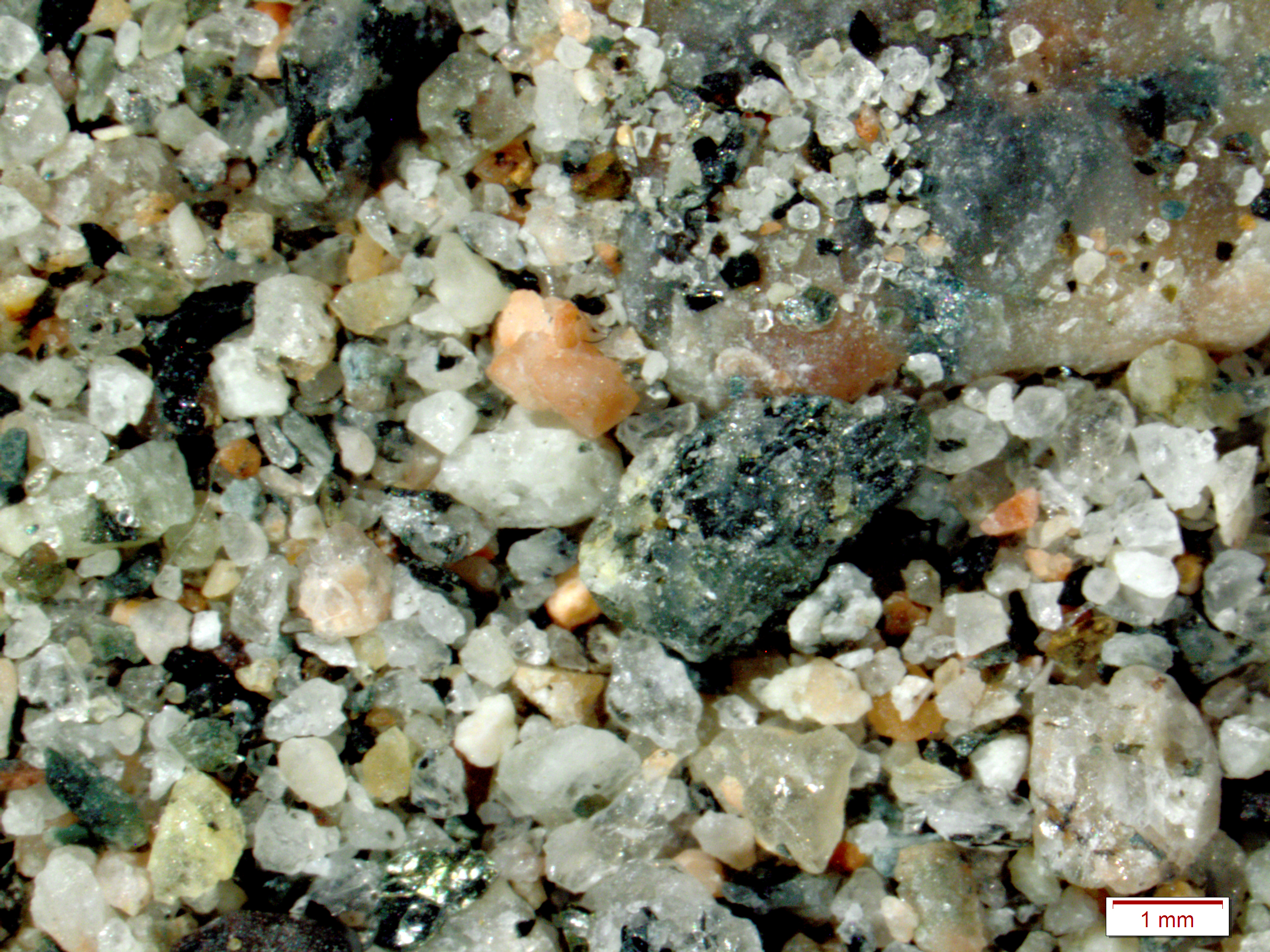
Glacial outwash sediment, Knud Rasmussen Glacier, Greenland

Deposits from the subsiding waters of an outburst flood may be poorly sorted, with a wide range of grain sizes, and without distinct bedforms. Other glaciofluvial sediments resemble sediments from non-glacial fluvial processes. They mainly consist of silt, sand and gravel with moderately rounded grain. The sediment nearer the glacier typically is coarser than non-glacial sediment, ranging from boulders down to sand, but with little silt and clay since the water usually flows too fast to allow these fine particle to settle until it is a considerable distance from the glacier. Generally the outwash deposits are finer further from the margin of the ice. The deposits often have distinct layers due to the seasonal and episodic changes in stream flow.

Outwash streams often flow into proglacial lakes, where they leave glaciolacustrine deposits. These mainly consist of silt and clay, with laminations on the millimeter scale. Sometimes they include varves, alternating coarser sediments in the summer periods of high melt discharge and finer sediment in the winter. When the stream terminates in the ocean it leaves glaciomarine sediments. Outwash streams may form deltas where they enter lakes or the ocean.

=== Kettles ===
Glaciofluvial deposits may surround and cover large blocks of ice. The debris may insulate the ice for several hundreds of years. Eventually the blocks of ice melt, leaving depressions called kettles, or kettle lakes if they fill with water. Kettles are often associated with ice contact deposits. They may also form within sheet deposits, but are usually smaller than the ice contact kettles.

== Moraine ==
Moraines consist of sediments deposited by a glacier and subsequent glacial meltwater also known as glacial till. Moraines are commonly found near the extremities of a glacier, the bounds between two glacial bodies, or underneath a glacial body. Moraines may be used to mark the extent of a glaciated region and the successive patterns of advance and retreat during glaciation. The name and specific characteristics of a moraine are dependent upon its location relative to the glacial body and the processes that deposited the relevant glacial till. Four overarching types of moraines include lateral, medial, ground, and end.

The size of the deposited sediments which form a moraine can range from clay to boulder sized. Moraines can be reworked by further glacial action or meltwater into other fluvioglacial landforms. Both original and reworked moraines record a continuum of processes occurring on the landscape as a result of glacial presence.

=== Lateral moraine ===
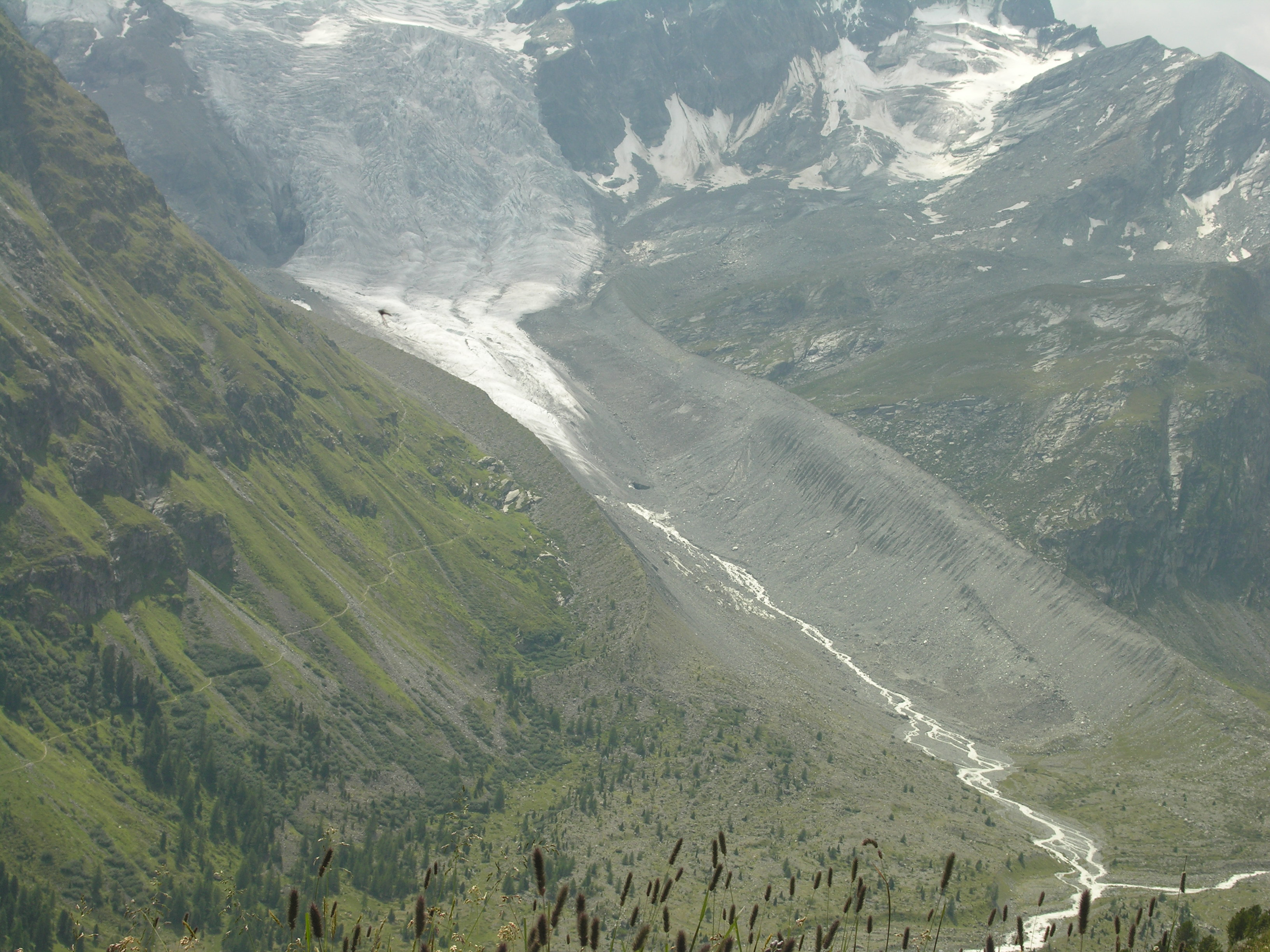
Lateral Moraine: moraine in upper Engadin left by retreating glacier

Lateral moraines are ridges of sediment deposited alongside the glacier running parallel to the long axis of the glacier. These sediments are typically deposited on top of the ice (supraglacial till) at the margin of the glacier and as such do not experience the same amount of glacial erosion as other incorporated sediments.^{,} Sediments that form the lateral moraines can be the result of frost weathering of the valley wall as the glacier passes through a region or sediment deposition by streams flowing into the glacial valley. These sediments settle into a ridge as the glacier retreats.

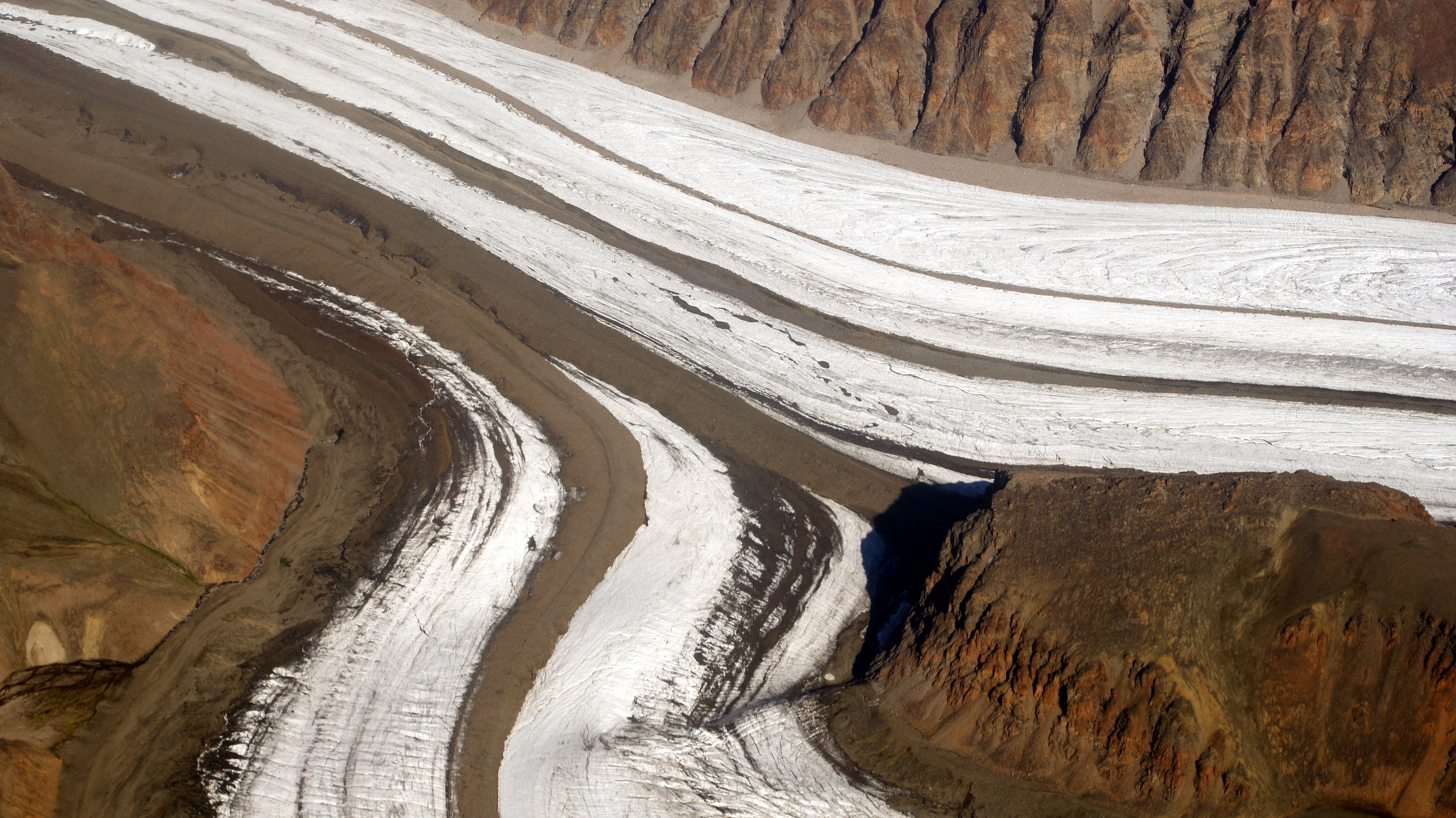
Medial Moraine: Nuussuaq Peninsula, Greenland.

=== Medial moraine ===
Medial moraines are often thought to be the result of two glaciers converging. The sediment located between both glaciers is pushed on top of the larger conjoined glacier as the two bodies come together. Medial moraines may also form as subglacial and englacial material is carried upward by ice flow and collects at the surface and inside the glacial body. This till is then carried along in the direction of glacial advance. As the glacier melts, the sediment is deposited as a ridge in the middle of the glacial valley.

=== Ground moraine ===
Ground moraines are regions of glacial till that form relatively flat areas or gently rolling hills. Commonly ground moraines are composed of lodgment till. Sediment clasts suspended in the ice at the bottom of the glacier have greater friction with the ground than the ice does. This causes the sediment to be slowed down disproportionately to the ice and eventually fall out or get stuck in the ground beneath the ice. The till may also be deposited as the glacier melts and retreats. Ground moraines are sometimes referred to as till plains. Ground moraines and loose till can be shaped into drumlins as the overlying glacier advances or retreats.

=== End moraine ===
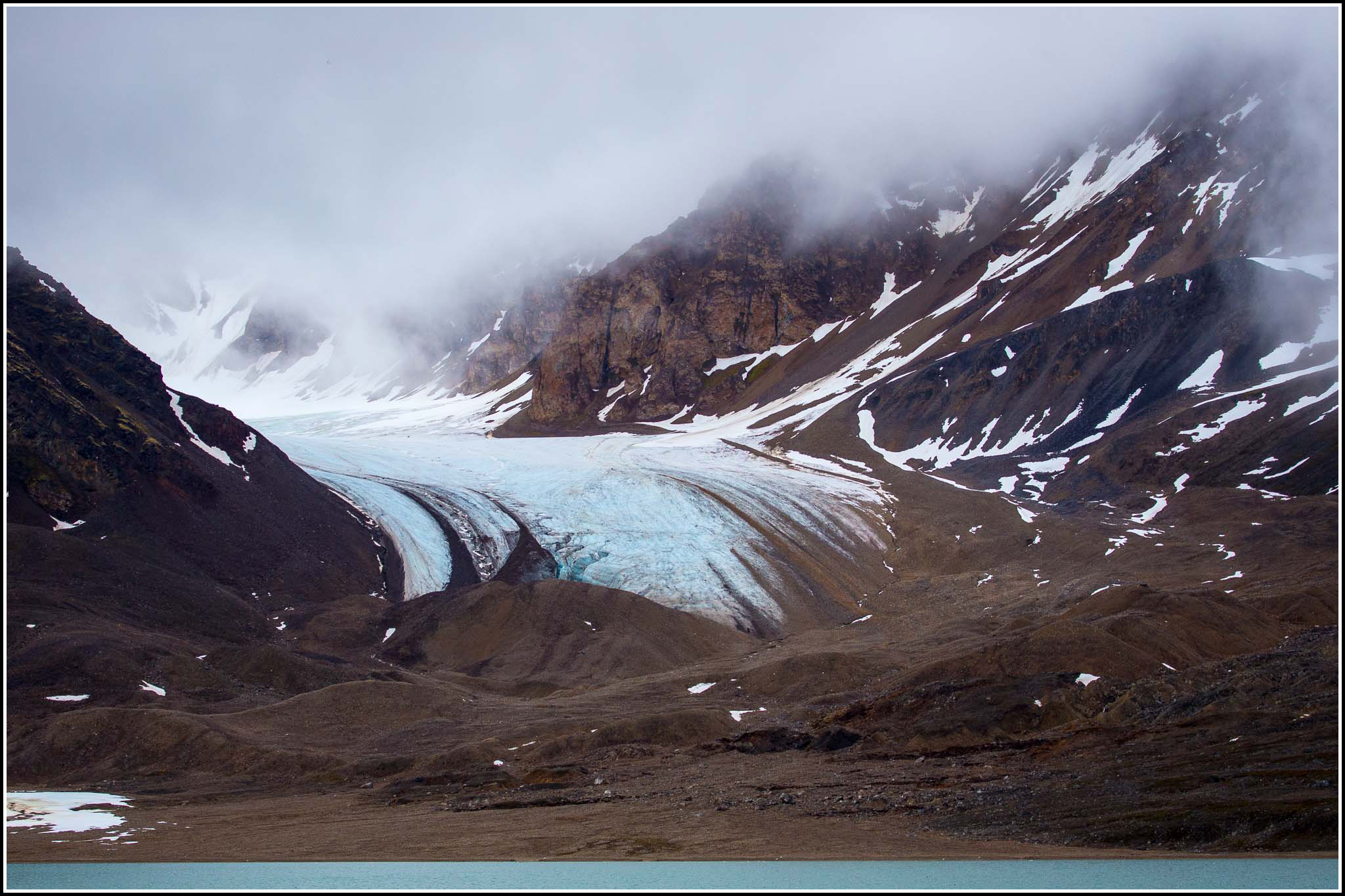
Terminal moraine: Glacier and terminal moraine at Tinayrebukta

Terminal moraines indicate the furthest advance of a glacier. As the glacier advances, sediment is transported to the bottom of the glacier and deposited. When the glacier melts, this unconsolidated debris forms ridges. The shape of a terminal represents the shape of the glacier snout or terminus. Terminal moraine refers to the moraine occurring at the point of the furthest advance of a glacier. A recessional moraine is a ridge of deposited debris that occurs when the glacier is stationary for an extended length of time. This occurs when a glacier meaning the glacier is in equilibrium or has halted during retreat . The occurrence of end moraines can be useful for determining a pattern of advance, retreat, and equilibrium of a glacier.

== Kames ==
A kame is an irregularly shaped hill or mound formed by sediment deposition of a retreating glacier. The sediments are held in a depression in the glacier and are subsequently deposited as the glacier melts. Glacial meltwater causes further erosion and the characteristically unusual shape of these landforms that distinguishes them from drumlins. Sediment grains located in a kame can range from fine to course-grained and cobble size to boulder-sized Others describe the size range as from sands to gravels. Kames are frequently associated with kettles in regions referred to as “kame and kettle topography”. These hills can range in size and be up to 50 m tall and 400 m wide.

=== Kame terrace ===
Kame terraces form when a glacial margin rests against a valley wall. The valley wall prevents meltwater streams from flowing outward away from the glacial snout. Instead, glacial meltwater is diverted laterally along the ice margin and deposits sediments between the glacier and valley wall. As the glacier retreats, the process may repeat creating a stepped slope or terrace referred to as a kame terrace. In a singular form, this landform may also be referred to as a kame moraine. Exact kame terrace morphology is dependent on the flow of the formative meltwater stream, and the angle between the ice margin and valley wall. Kame terraces are useful tool to indicate past ice margins.

A kame terrace is a relatively flat surface of sediments that was deposited between the valley surface and the glacier. When a kame surfaces and other fluvio-glacial landforms are combined into one landscape, it is called a kame complex or glacial karst topography.

=== Kame delta ===
A kame delta is a flat-topped landform of well sorted sand and gravel glaciofluvial sediments deposited by a meltwater stream into a body of water or river system. As such, kame deltas may be used to indicate a point of inflow into a body of water, such as a proglacial lake, even after that water has ceased to be present in a landscape. Sediment heavy meltwater streams running out of or off of a glacial body will slow in velocity once in contact with a body of water. This decrease in velocity causes the streams to be unable to carry sediment and the sediment falls out of the water column. Heavier sediments will fall out of the water column first as the water velocity decreases. As such, layered bedding of sediment size is expected in kame deltas.

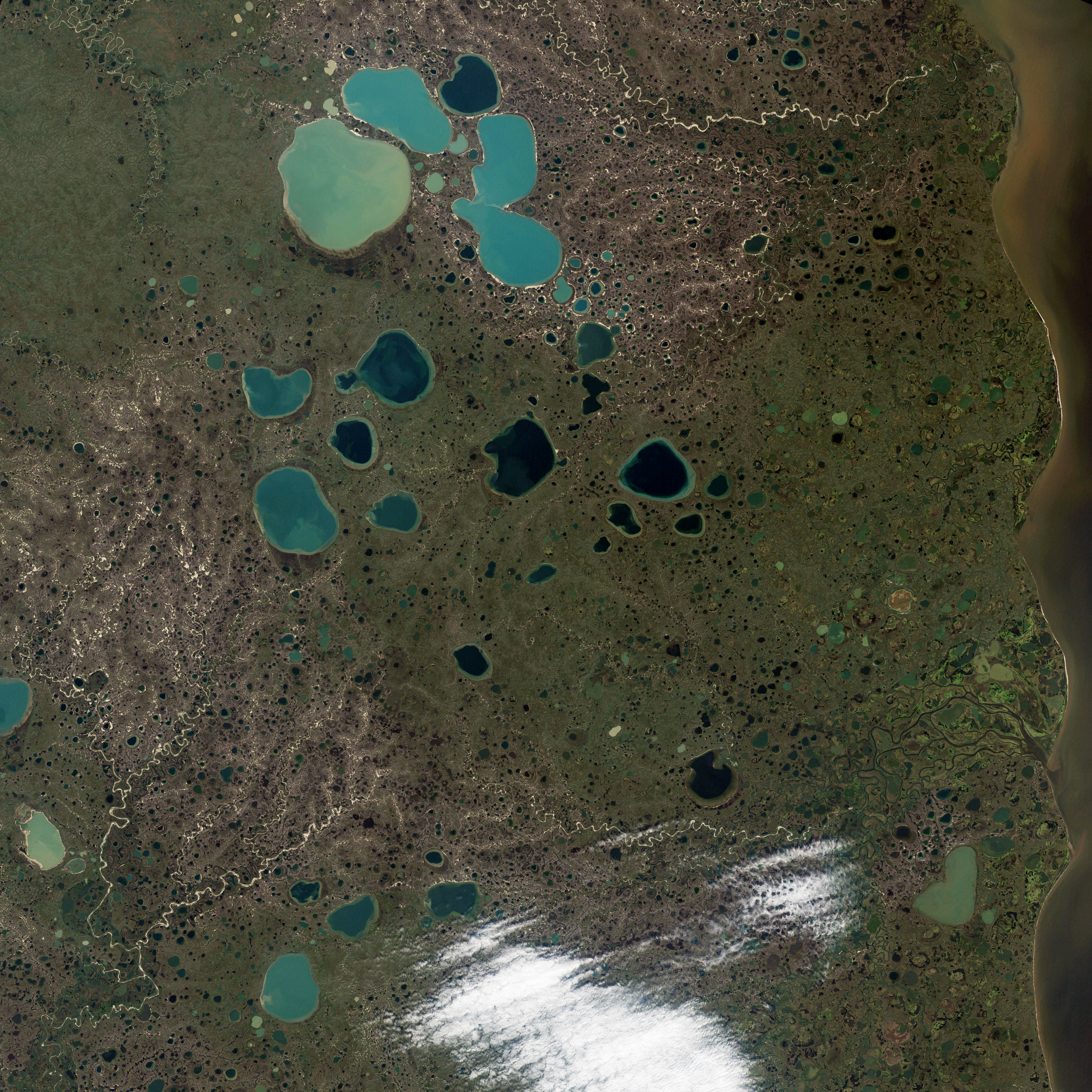
Kettle Lakes: Landsat image of pothole lakes in Siberia. The different colors of the lakes reflect different amounts of sediment or depth; the deeper or clearer the water, the bluer the lake.

== Kettle ==
Kettles, or kettle holes, are impressions left in a glacial outwash plain by remnant ice of a retreating glacier. As a glacier retreats, chunks of ice may break off in a process known as ice calving or glacier calving. As sediment-heavy glacial meltwater flows past the stationary ice block, the increased friction between the ice and sediment causes sediment build-up around the block of ice. The sediment may become so extensive as to completely bury the ice piece. The ice then melts and leaves behind an impression in the ground.

The remaining hole is referred to as a kettle. The exact size and characteristics of the kettle whole are a result of the degree of ice burial. Often these holes become filled with water by meltwater streams and are referred to as kettle lakes. Kettle lakes are often shallow due to the amount of sediment carried into them by glacial meltwater.

Kettle holes can often be found in the outwash plain of a glacier. Kettle holes can be anywhere from 5 m to 30 km wide.

== Eskers ==
Eskers are long, curving ridges of stratified sediments found in previously glaciated regions. They may be several meters to hundreds of kilometers in length, and 3 m to 200 m tall. The height and width of an esker are determined by the water and ice pressure and sediment load at the time of formation. Eskers form in ice tunnels within or under a glacier, as shown in Figure 1, and are composed of the sediment deposits from the streams that occupy these tunnels. Eskers may also form from supra-glacial streams that cut into the crevasses of the glacier. After the ice has melted away the stream deposits are left remaining as long mounded eskers. A system of subglacial streams may create a branched formation of eskers, although these are not often continuous branches.

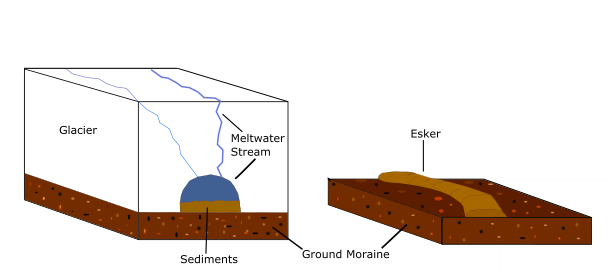
Figure 1: Esker Formation On the left, meltwater streams deposit sediments in a subglacial meltwater tunnel. On the right, the presence of a fully formed esker after the retreat of the glacier.

Often eskers follow the flow direction of the glacier, but in high-pressure cases meltwater is pushed to the lowest available spot which can form a very shallow and wide subglacial stream, resulting in short and wide eskers. Under less pressure, often near the terminal end of a glacier, where the ice moves rather slowly, steeped walled eskers may form. The debris found in eskers is dependent on the sediment in the ice and the supply to the meltwater stream within the tunnel. This sediment is usually sand to cobble-sized, with the occasional larger boulder. Bedding, although irregular at times, is expected in eskers.

== Drumlins ==
A drumlin is an elongated hill shaped like a half-buried egg, where the shallower end of the hill also narrows in width. A collection of drumlins in one area is referred to as a field or swarm and creates a landscape sometimes called a “basket of eggs topography”. The shape of a drumlin may vary but most often is oval in nature with a long axis parallel to the direction of ice flow. The steeper slope is typically up-ice whereas the shallower slow is down-ice. It is proposed that the width to length ratio of a drumlin can be used to determine the velocity at which a glacier was traveling. An elongated drumlin indicates a slower glacial velocity, whereas a shortened drumlin indicates a much faster glacial velocity. This is surmised due to the relationship between friction and surface area.

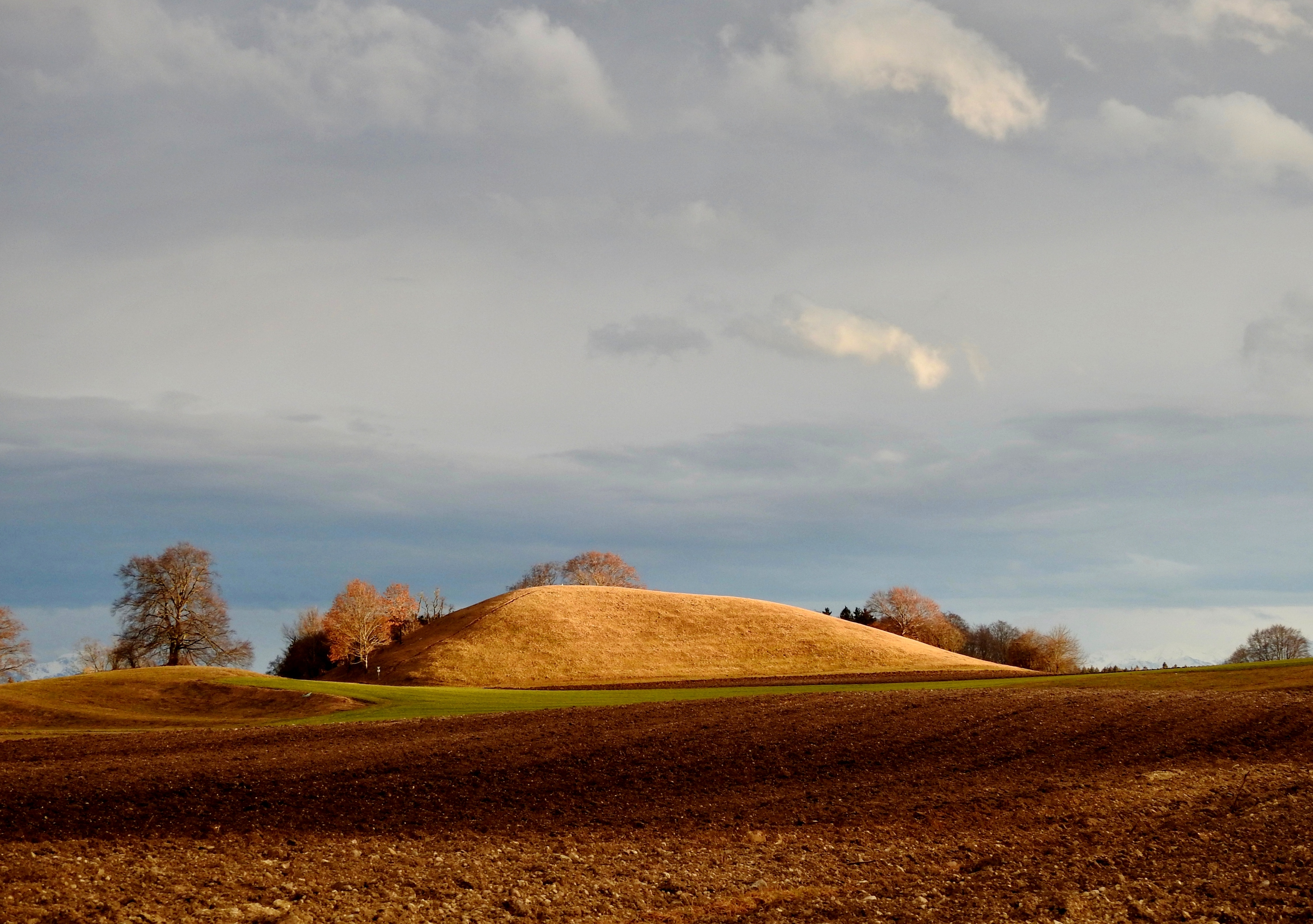
Drumlin

Drumlins form as overlying ice moves across unconsolidated till or ground moraines. There are two main theories for the formation of drumlins. Although the exact origins of these landforms may vary circumstantially and is a topic of debate. The first, often called constructional, suggests that glacial till is deposited by meltwater streams and accumulated by the continual push of an overlying glacier. By this process the individual till particles in the drumlin align themselves in the direction of ice flow. Scientists can test this theory by studying the orientation of the sediment grains with the overall orientation of the drumlin. The second theory is that the erosion caused by the heavy overlying glacier scrapes material from an unconsolidated sediment bed and repositions it and deposits it at the drumlin. The drumlin is similarly shaped by the flow of ice as in the previously mentioned theory. The distinction being where the glacial till is derived from before being shaped. In all circumstances, because the subglacial region is not visible until after the glacier has retreated and because there is great variability in drumlin presentation, there remains some uncertainty as to the processes that shape these landforms.

Drumlins may be composed of stratified or unstratified till ranging in size from sand to boulders. The non-uniformity of drumlin composition is representative of the diverse origin of the sediments. Banding or layering of till may occur in drumlins as till accumulates on the drumlin formation in successive layers.

== Plains ==
=== Outwash plain ===
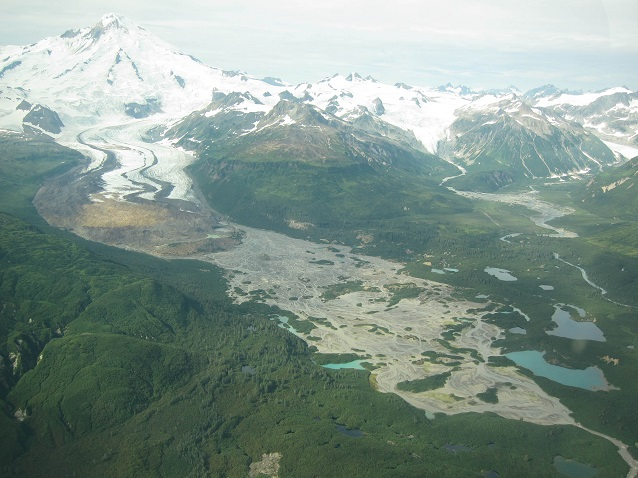
Outwash Plain: Red Glacier in Lake Clark National Monument (Alaska)

An outwash plain is a relatively flat region at the terminus of a glacier where glacial sediments are deposited by meltwater outwash. The sediment is distally sorted, the larger sediment being deposited closer to the margin of the glacier and finer-grained sediment carried further along by the meltwater streams. Outwash plains may contain other glaciofluvial landforms including meltwater streams, kames, and kettle lakes. River systems in outwash plains typically form braided rivers due to the high sediment content in the water. Since these streams meander around, the erosion happens laterally (left to right) instead of vertically (up and down). These plains are usually found beyond the end moraine deposited by the glacier.

=== Till plains ===
Till plains are regions of flat to gently sloping topography, composed of till deposited by a melting glacier. Till plains may also be referred to as a region of ground moraines. Different from outwash plains, till plains form when a section of ice breaks off from the main glacier. The sediment contained in this ice is deposited as a till plain when the ice melts. The till is further dispersed and molded by the resulting meltwater. The composition of a till plain varies greatly and is dependent upon the path the glacier took and the bedrock underlying the glaciated region. Till plains are composed of poorly sorted sediment ranging in size from sand to large boulders. Landforms contained in a till plain include drumlins and moraines which are composed of glacial till.

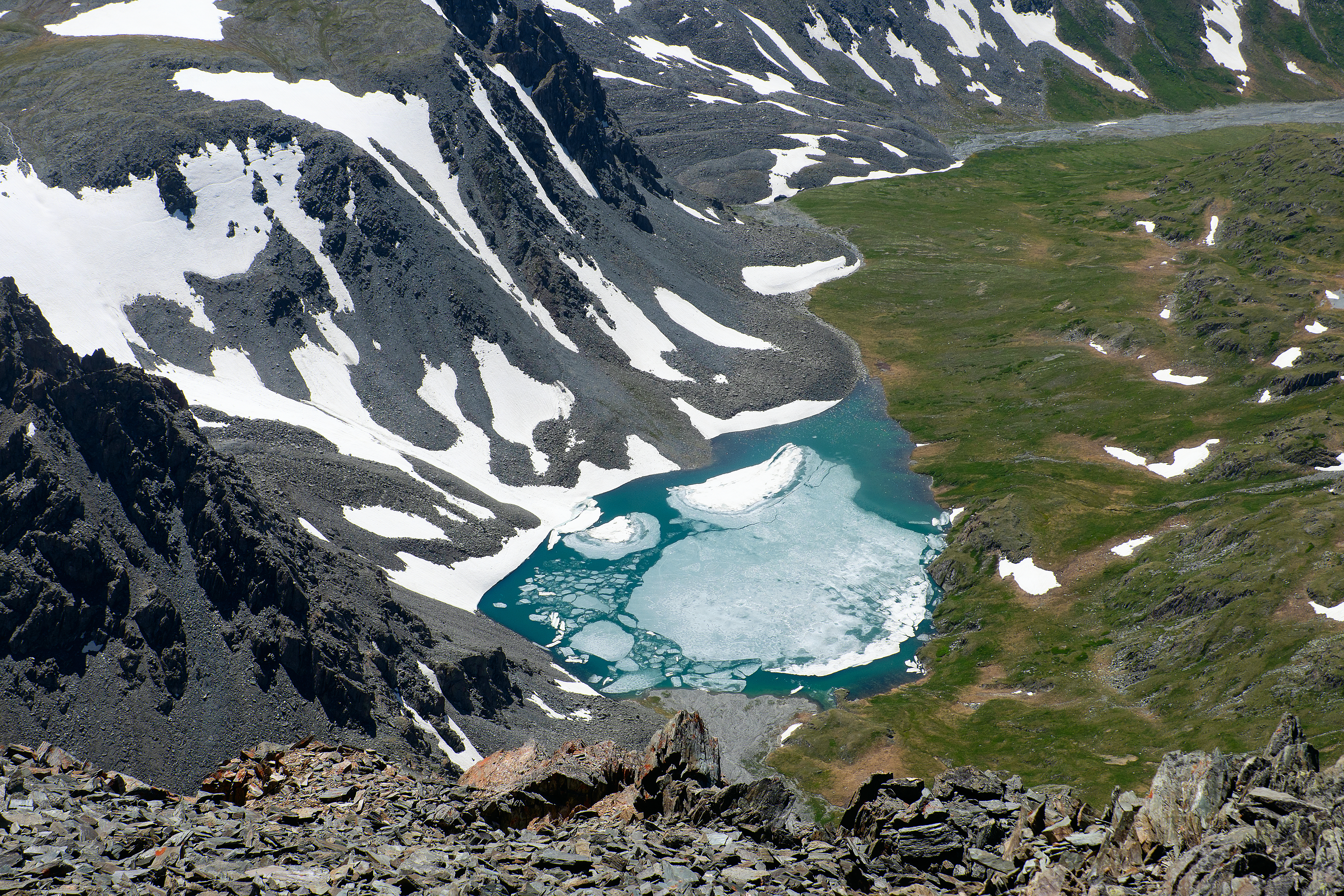
Proglacial Lake in Altai Mountains

=== Varves ===
Varves are a depositional feature of a fluvio-glacial movement. They are annually repeated sediment deposits. The sizes of the sediments vary and depend on the volume of the streams, but are usually associated with mud deposits (silt and clay). The color and amount of the sediment deposited also varies depending upon the season; summer deposits typically have larger volumes of deposition and are characterized as being light, whereas winter deposits are usually the opposite. Winter deposits are fairly uncommon because the water is frozen into ice again.

== Proglacial lake ==
A proglacial lake is an impoundment of water prevented from flowing by a glacier, glacial till dam or behind a glacial feature such as an end moraine. Proglacial lakes are usually the byproduct of glacial meltwater. The sediment contained in a proglacial lake is a useful geochronological tool that records patterns of change in a glaciated region. Proglacial lakes may be dammed by a moraine, glacial ice, or may be trapped at the snout of a glacier by the isostatic depression of the crust by the glacier.^{,} A tarn is a specific term for a proglacial lake that forms in the over-deepened bowl of a cirque.

== See also ==
- Ice sheet
- Glacier
- Landform
- Fluvial sediment processes
- Glacial landform
- Meltwater
- Glacial erosion

== Sources ==
- Benn, D.I. (2009), "Glaciofluvial Sediments", in Gornitz, V. (ed.), Encyclopedia of Paleoclimatology and Ancient Environments, Encyclopedia of Earth Sciences Series, Dordrecht: Springer, p. 394, doi:10.1007/978-1-4020-4411-3_98, ISBN 978-1-4020-4551-6
- Brennand, Tracy A. (2004). "Glacifluvial (glaciofluvial)". In A. S. Goudie (ed.). Encyclopedia of Geomorphology. Vol. 1, A–I. Routledge. pp. 459–465.
- Earle, Steven (September 2019), "Glacial Deposition", Physical Geology
- "Glaciofluvial deposits", Britannica, Encyclopædia Britannica
- Goudie, Andrew, ed. (2004). Encyclopedia of Geomorphology. Vol. 2. Routledge. ISBN 978-0-415-32738-1.
- Merritt, J. W.; Auton, C. A.; Connell, E. R.; Hall, A. M.; Peacock, J. D. (2003). Cainozoic geology and landscape evolution of north-east Scotland. Memoir for the drift editions of 1:50 000 geological sheets 66E Banchory, 67 Stonehaven, 76E Inverurie, 77 Aberdeen, 86E Turriff, 87W Ellon, 87E Peterhead, 95 Elgin, 96W Portsoy, 96E Banff and 97 Fraserburgh (Scotland). Edinburgh: British Geological Survey. ISBN 9780852724637.
