= Iceway =

An iceway is a linear channel eroded through bedrock by the passage of glacial ice. The term was coined by geographer Ronald Kay Gresswell in a paper in 1964 in relation to the origins of the Dee and Mersey estuaries on the boundary of northwest England and northeast Wales. Gresswell identified several such sub-parallel features running in a northwest to southeast direction from Liverpool Bay through Merseyside into Cheshire. The Dee estuary and its landward continuation south of Chester as far as Farndon along with the Mersey estuary are the two largest iceways discerned in this region. Further iceways were identified underlying the lower Gowy valley and the Alt-Ditton depression east of Liverpool. Each of these has also been referred to as tunnel valleys.
