= Subglacial channel =

A subglacial meltwater channel is a channel beneath an ice mass, such as ice sheets and valley glaciers, roughly parallel to the main ice flow direction. These meltwater channels can have different sizes, ranging from very small channels of a metre deep and wide to big valleys which can be up to a kilometre wide. The dimensions of these channels are regulated by several factors: water temperature, meltwater volume, debris content in the water, ice wall closure rates (governed by the ice thickness) and squeezing of fluidized sediment. In the glaciological literature three forms of subglacial meltwater channels are commonly mentioned.

== R-channels ==
The first type of channel is the R-channel after Hans Röthlisberger who initiated work on water pressures in tubes under glaciers. These are semi-circular channels cut upward into the ice. The balance between channel enlargement by viscous heating and closure by ice deformation when the channels are water-filled reflects their size and water pressure. He stated the equation

$$\frac{dp_w}{dx}=const\cdot Q^{-2/11}\Big(\frac{p_i-p_w}{nA}\Big)^{8n/11}$$

where $Q$ is the discharge, $A$ and $n$ the same as in Glen's flow law, $p_w$ is the steady state pressure, $p_i$ is the initial pressure, and $x$ is the distance upstream.

== H-channels ==
The second type mentioned are H-channels, after Roger Hooke. These channels are similar to R channels, cut upward into the ice that tends to follow the local bed slope but are broad and flatter than R channels. Such channels form where water flows at atmospheric pressure beneath thin ice and on steep downglacier bedslopes.

== N-channels ==
The final type, the N-channel (after John Nye), are those incised into bedrock, perhaps suggesting long-term channel stability under some glaciers.
