= Outwash fan =

Type of sediment deposition by a melting glacier

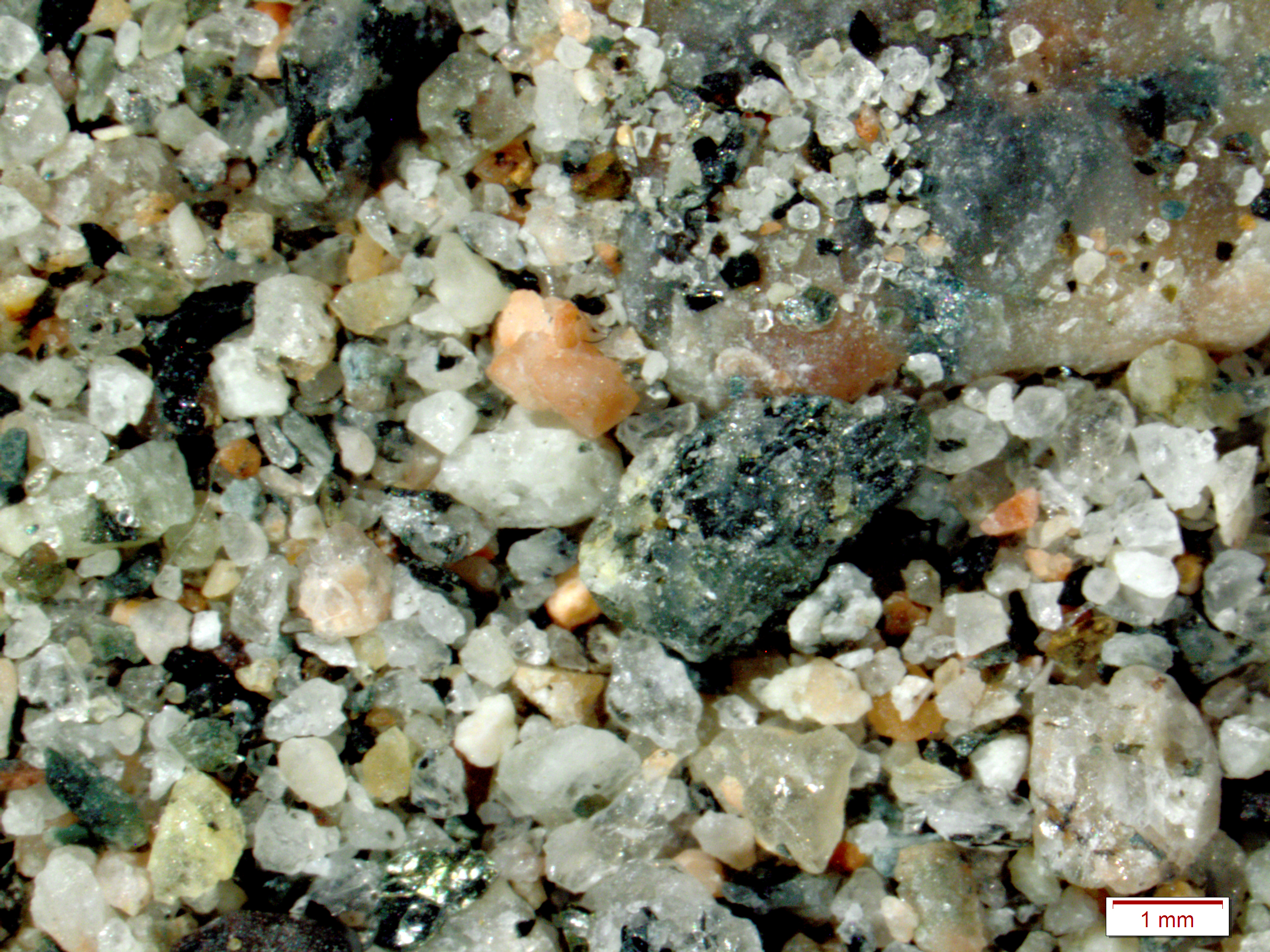
Glacial outwash sediment, Knud Rasmussen Glacier, Greenland

An outwash fan is a fan-shaped body of sediments deposited by braided streams from a melting glacier. Sediment locked within the ice of the glacier gets transported by the streams of meltwater, and deposits on the outwash plain, at the terminus of the glacier. The outwash, the sediment transported and deposited by the meltwater and that makes up the fan, is usually poorly sorted due to the short distance traveled before being deposited.

== Formation ==
Outwash fans typically form from valley glaciers flowing downhill in the mountains. Thus, outwash fans are usually found in colder environments where glaciers are more prevalent and are often located where a valley or canyon empties out onto a flatter wider plain.

Outwash fans form when melt-water from a retreating glacier deposits transported sediment in the shape of a fan along the outwash plain. Glaciers contain large amounts of sediment (i.e. sand, silt, clay) that is gathered through glacial erosional processes such as abrasion between the glacier and the underlying rocks, and through glacial plucking. As the glacier begins to retreat and ablation increases, the melting ice deposits sediments from a single source at the terminus of the glacier. Melt-water from the glacier forming a braided stream then carries the sediment away and redeposits it further away from the glacier.

The sedimentation of the outwash fan is often poorly sorted due to the short distance covered by the transported sediment, however, water runoff from the glacier acts as a natural sorter. Finer materials such as silt and clay are redeposited further away from the glacier, while larger sediments such as pebbles and rocks remain closest to the glacier. Because the sediments rely on melt water for transportation, the ablation rate directly affects the development of an outwash fan. Other factors that affect fan morphology include the slope of the outwash fan and the depth and width of its distributive channels.

Minor fans, unlike the more extensive outwash fans that transport larger sized material by high energy streams from underneath the glacier, are mainly made up of fine grained sediments (i.e. sand) and are deposited by low energy streams that drain debris along the glacier's surface.
