= Main Line (Columbus to Chicago) =

The Columbus to Chicago Main Line was a rail line owned and operated by the Pennsylvania Railroad in the U.S. states of Ohio, Indiana, and Illinois. The line ran from Columbus, Ohio northwest via Logansport, Indiana to Chicago, Illinois. Junctions included the Columbus to Indianapolis Main Line via Bradford, which split at Bradford to reach the Pittsburgh to St. Louis Main Line at New Paris, Ohio; the Fort Wayne Branch at Ridgeville, Indiana; the Richmond Branch (from Cincinnati) at Anoka, Indiana; and the South Bend Branch and I&F Branch at Logansport.

The line has largely been abandoned. The Norfolk Southern Railway operates the portion from Redkey, Indiana west to Sweetser as the Red Key Secondary, and a short piece from Schererville, Indiana, to Hartsdale, Indiana, as the Logansport Secondary. The portion from Anoka to Logansport is part of the Winamac Southern Railway.

== History ==
The oldest piece of the line is the part closest to Columbus; the Columbus, Piqua and Indiana Railroad opened from Columbus to Union City, Indiana (on the state line) in 1853 and 1854 to Piqua and 1859 to Union City. Closer to Chicago, the Cincinnati and Chicago Railroad opened the short piece between Anoka and Logansport in 1857 as part of a longer line between Richmond and Logansport. The Chicago and Cincinnati Railroad opened the line from Logansport to La Crosse and beyond to Valparaiso in 1861; a bridge over the Wabash River at Logansport, connecting to the existing line, was opened the same year by the Cincinnati and Chicago Air-Line Railroad. The Chicago and Great Eastern Railway opened the line from La Crosse to Chicago (and abandoned the old line to Valparaiso) in 1865, and absorbed the Chicago and Cincinnati Railroad and Cincinnati and Chicago Air-Line Railroad later that year. The piece from Union City to Marion was opened in 1867 from by the Columbus and Indiana Central Railway, the successor to the Columbus, Piqua and Indiana Railroad, and, in 1868, the Columbus and Indiana Central Railway and Chicago and Great Eastern Railway merged to form the Columbus, Chicago and Indiana Central Railway and completed the line from Marion to Anoka; the CC&IC owned the entire line from Columbus to Chicago.

The Pittsburgh, Cincinnati and St. Louis Railway leased the CC&IC on February 1, 1869, placing it under Pennsylvania Railroad control and giving the PRR a second route to Chicago (it already owned the Fort Wayne Line). The PC&StL and its successors, the Pittsburgh, Cincinnati, Chicago and St. Louis Railway and Pittsburgh, Cincinnati, Chicago and St. Louis Railroad, operated the line until January 1, 1921, when the PRR began operating it under lease. The line passed to Penn Central Transportation in 1968 and Conrail in 1976; Conrail slowly abandoned almost all of it. The route was abandoned in 1982 between Schererville and Winamac, the rest of the line was removed by 1986 with the exception of the track between Winamac and Logansport, which was removed in 2005.
