= Bradford Ohio Railroad Museum =

- Bradford Junction Interlocking Tower
- U.S. National Register of Historic Places
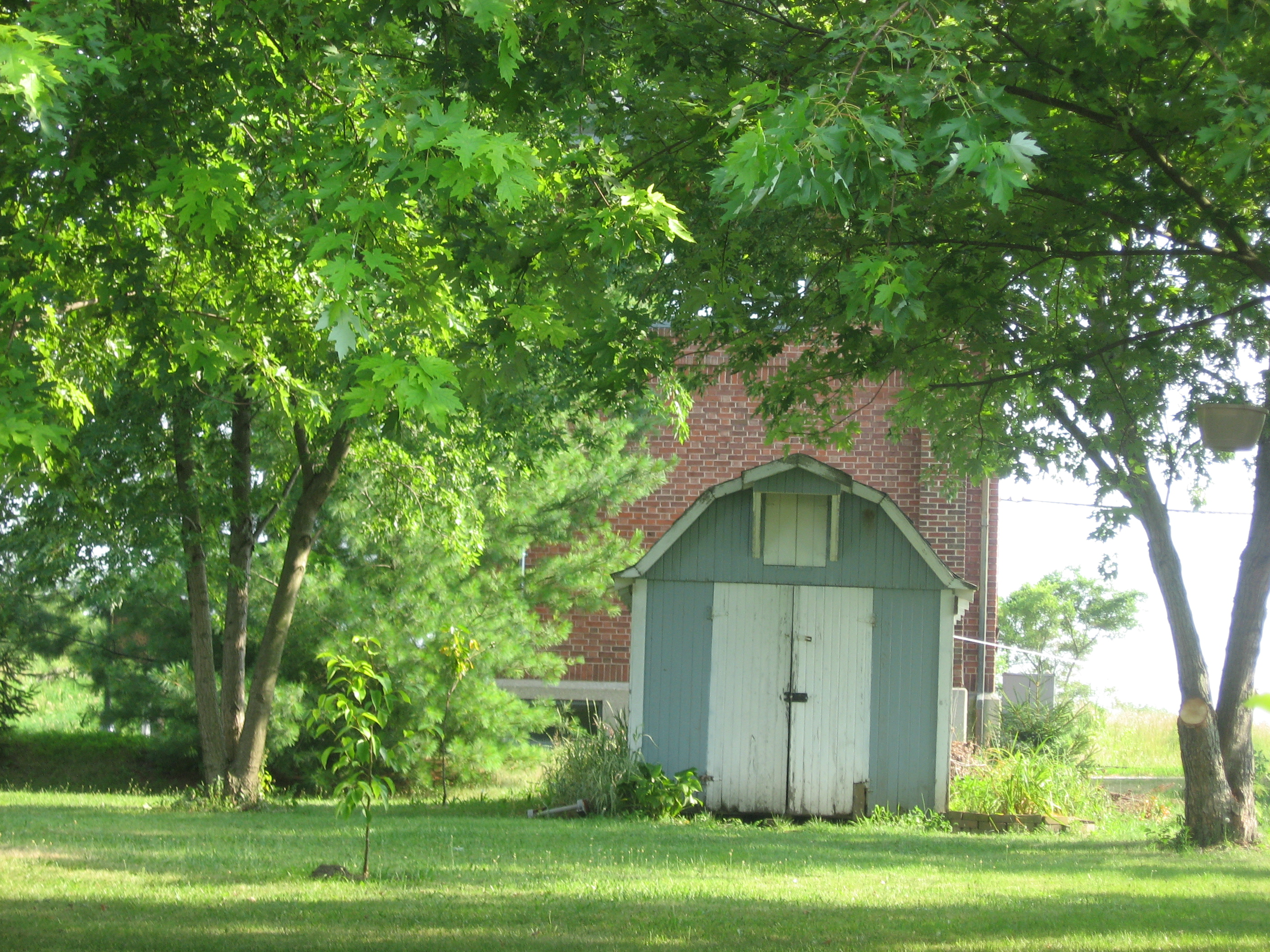
- Base of the Bradford Junction Interlocking Tower

- Location within Ohio
- Location: 501 E. Main St., Bradford, Ohio
- Coordinates: 40°07′52″N 84°25′29″W
- Area: 0.3 acres (0.12 ha)
- Built by: Pennsylvania RR
- NRHP reference No.: 95000497
- Added to NRHP: April 20, 1995

The Bradford Ohio Railroad Museum is in Bradford, Ohio and includes the BF Tower, a two-story switching tower also known as the Bradford Junction Interlocking Tower, a historic structure listed on the National Register of Historic Places.

The museum is at 200 North Miami Avenue. The two-story tower is part of the museum's HOBO exhibit at 501 East Main Street and has been renovated.

The tower was built about 1929 and incorporated Armstrong levers to signal switches at the terminus of the Pennsylvania Railroad line to Indianapolis. The tower had a telegraph and later telephones and then radio. A historical marker commemorates its history. It closed in 1984.

The rail line is now a rail-to-trail. A Ohio Museums Association video features the B. F. Tower's rubble n cutting after restoration and discusses its significance.

== See also ==
- Main Line (Columbus to Indianapolis via Bradford)
- National Register of Historic Places listings in Miami County, Ohio
- List of museums in Ohio
