= Joseph D. Oliver =

American businessman (1850–1933)

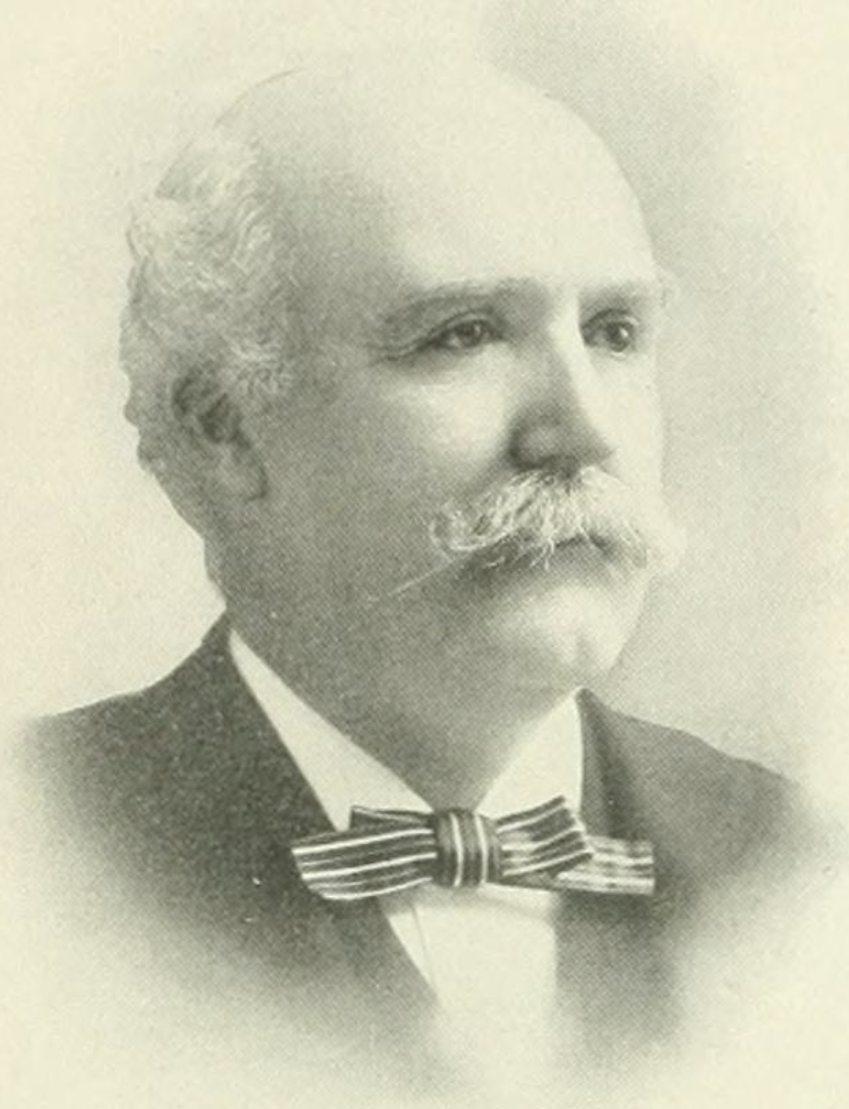
- Oliver in 1901 publication
- Born: Joseph Doty Oliver; August 2, 1850
- Died: August 6, 1933 (aged 83); South Bend, Indiana, U.S.
- Resting place: Riverview Cemetery; South Bend, Indiana, U.S.
- Other names: J. D. Oliver
- Education: DePauw University; University of Notre Dame
- Occupation: Businessman
- Spouse: Anna Gertrude Wells (m. 1884)
- Children: 4
- Father: James Oliver

Joseph Doty (J.D.) Oliver (August 2, 1850 – August 6, 1933) was an American businessman and President of the Oliver Farm Equipment Company in South Bend, Indiana.

== Early life ==
Joseph Doty Oliver was born to Susan Catherine (née Doty) and James Oliver on August 2, 1850. His father was an inventor. Oliver attended public schools in South Bend. He took courses at DePauw University and the University of Notre Dame.

== Career ==
His first job was in his father's plant, then called Oliver, Bissel and Company, for 75 cents a day. He was elected Treasurer at the age of 16, Director at 20, and became President in 1908 after his father's death. His public works include funding (along with his father) the Oliver Opera House in 1884, Oliver Hotel in 1899, and City Hall, as well serving as the Indiana Director of War Savings during World War I.

Oliver served as a director of the Pittsburgh, Cincinnati, Chicago and St. Louis Railroad, the First National Bank of Chicago and the Chase National Bank of New York. He served as trustee of Purdue University for 18 years.

== Personal life ==
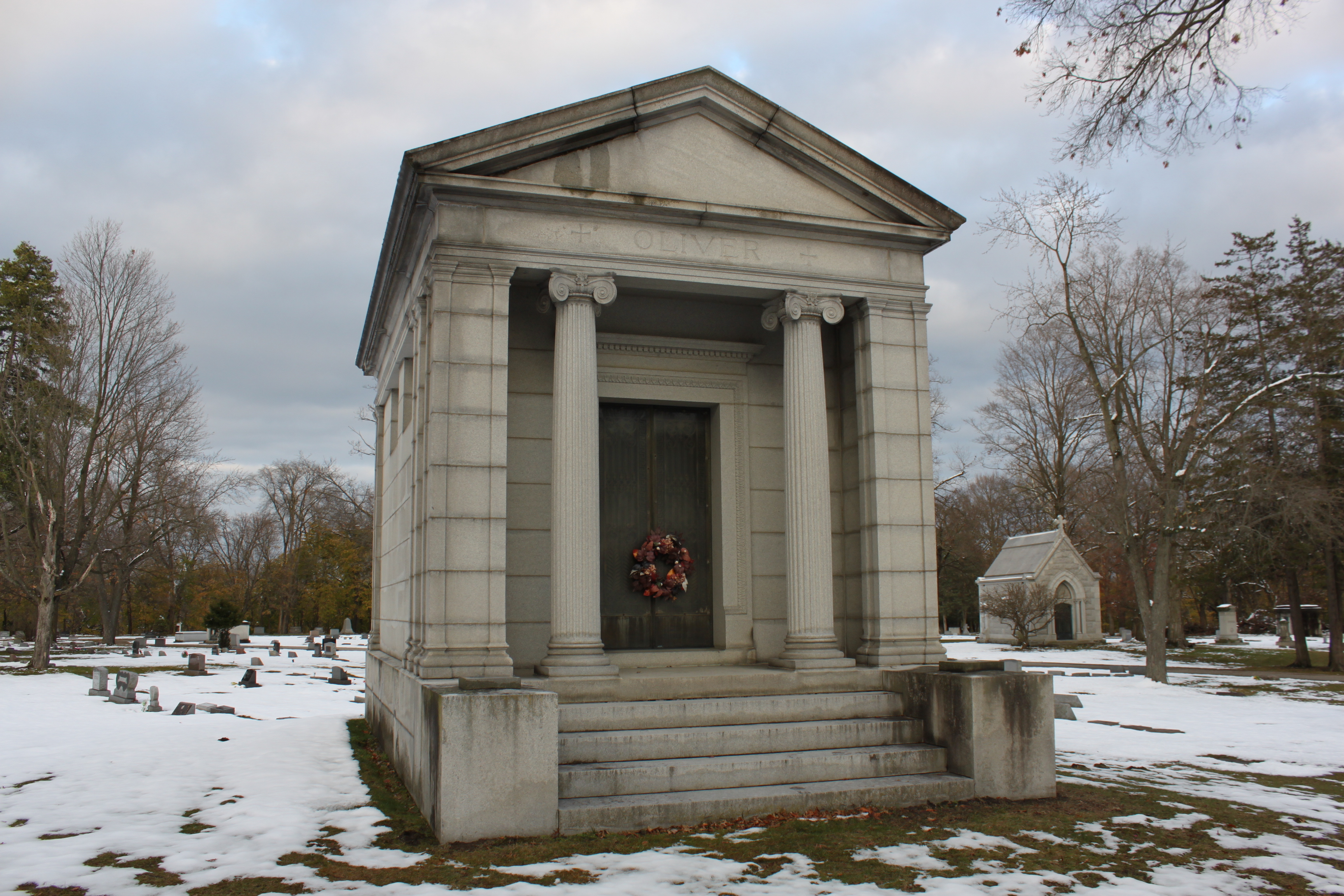
Oliver Mausoleum in Riverview Cemetery

Oliver married Anna Gertrude Wells of Johnstown, New York, on December 10, 1884. They had four children, James II, Gertrude, Joseph Jr. and Susan Catherine. Oliver was a member of the Presbyterian church.

The Oliver family built a house on West Washington Street in South Bend. It was named Copshaholm, in honor of the birthplace of Oliver's father.

Oliver died on August 6, 1933, in South Bend, Indiana. Oliver was buried in the Oliver mausoleum at the Riverview Cemetery in South Bend.
