= Main Line (Pittsburgh to St. Louis) =

The Pittsburgh to St. Louis Main Line was a rail line owned and operated by the Pennsylvania Railroad in the U.S. states of Pennsylvania, Ohio, Indiana, and Illinois. The line ran from Pittsburgh, Pennsylvania west via Steubenville, Ohio, Columbus, Ohio, Dayton, Ohio, Indianapolis, Indiana, Terre Haute, Indiana, and Vandalia, Illinois to East St. Louis, Illinois. In addition to its east end in downtown Pittsburgh, where it met the Main Line and Pittsburgh to Chicago Main Line, junctions included the Columbus to Chicago Main Line at Columbus, the C&X Branch (to Cincinnati) at Xenia, the Columbus to Indianapolis Main Line via Bradford (a freight bypass of Dayton) at New Paris, the Richmond Branch and Fort Wayne Branch at Richmond, the Louisville Branch and I&F Branch at Indianapolis, and the Peoria Branch at Farrington, Illinois.

Large portions of the line have been abandoned; the only major pieces still in use are from Mingo Junction (west of Steubenville) to Columbus, operated by the Columbus and Ohio River Rail Road (Ohio Central Railroad System), and west of Terre Haute, operated by CSX Transportation as part of its St. Louis Line Subdivision. Other existing pieces are from Rosslyn, Pennsylvania to Walkers Mill (Pittsburgh and Ohio Central Railroad), Weirton Junction, West Virginia to Mingo Junction (Norfolk Southern Railway Weirton Secondary), Columbus to London, Ohio (NS Dayton District), Clement, Ohio to Dayton (NS), just east of Richmond, Indiana (NS New Castle District), and from Indianapolis to Ben Davis, Indiana (CSX Crawfordsville Branch Subdivision).

== History ==
The Steubenville and Indiana Railroad opened a line from Steubenville west to Newark in 1853, 1854, and 1855. In 1857, it built a connection in Newark to the Central Ohio Railroad and signed a trackage rights agreement over the Central Ohio to Columbus; it bought a one-half interest in that portion of the Central Ohio in 1864. The Pennsylvania Railroad's Steubenville Extension, Pittsburg and Steubenville Railroad, and Steubenville Bridge across the Ohio River opened in 1865, connecting Pittsburgh to the Steubenville and Indiana. Both companies were operated as a continuous line by the Western Transportation Company until 1868, when they merged to form the Pittsburgh, Cincinnati and St. Louis Railway, owned by the Pennsylvania Railroad.

The oldest part of the line was opened by the Columbus and Xenia Railroad in 1850, from Columbus west to Xenia. The Dayton and Western Railroad opened from Dayton west to New Paris in 1853. The Indiana Central Railway also opened in 1853, continuing west from New Paris (on the Ohio/Indiana state line) to Indianapolis. The Indiana Central began operating the Dayton and Western in 1854. The Dayton, Xenia and Belpre Railroad opened in 1858, filling the gap between Xenia and Dayton, and was immediately leased by the Columbus and Xenia. Operation of the Dayton and Western was transferred to the Columbus and Xenia by lease in 1863; the Little Miami Railroad leased the Columbus and Xenia (and thus the line from Columbus to New Paris) in 1868. The Pittsburgh, Cincinnati and St. Louis Railway leased the Columbus, Chicago and Indiana Central Railway (the Indiana Central's successor) and the Little Miami in 1869, giving the PRR a line to Indianapolis (including an alternate route between Columbus and New Paris), fully operated by the PC&StL.

The Terre Haute and Richmond Railroad opened the line from Indianapolis west to Terre Haute in 1852. The line from East St. Louis east to Terre Haute was opened in 1868, 1869, and 1870 by the St. Louis, Vandalia and Terre Haute Railroad (in Illinois) and the Terre Haute and Indianapolis Rail Road, the Terre Haute and Richmond's successor (in Indiana). The entire line was operated by the Terre Haute and Indianapolis under lease until 1905, when the two companies were merged into the Vandalia Railroad.

The Pittsburgh, Cincinnati, Chicago and St. Louis Railway (the PC&StL's successor) and the Vandalia Railroad merged in 1917 to form the Pittsburgh, Cincinnati, Chicago and St. Louis Railroad, which the Pennsylvania Railroad leased in 1921. The line passed to Penn Central Transportation in 1968 and Conrail in 1976, after which large portions were sold off or abandoned.

== See also ==
- Little Miami Railroad
