= Pittsburgh & Steubenville Extension Railroad Tunnel =

Panhandle Tunnel
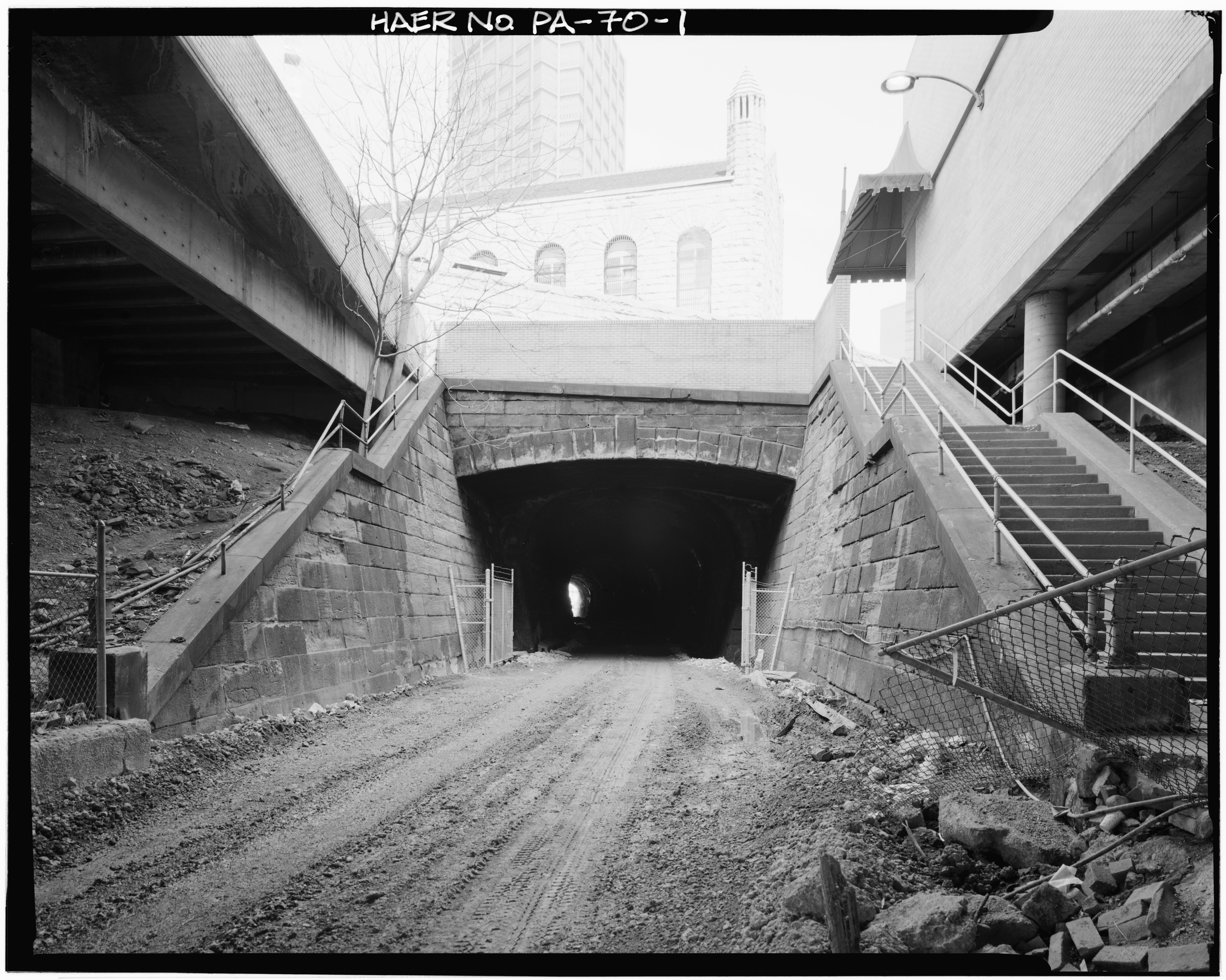
- Southern portal of the Panhandle Tunnel, April 1982

Overview
- Location: Pittsburgh, Pennsylvania
- Coordinates: 40.44111°N 79.99657°W
- Status: in use
- System: Pittsburgh Light Rail

Operation
- Work began: 1863
- Opened: 1865
- Owner: 1863–1968: Pennsylvania Railroad; 1968–1976: Penn Central; 1976–1980: Conrail; Since 1980: Port Authority of Allegheny County

Technical
- Length: 1,440 ft (440 m)
- No. of tracks: 2, 1 under U.S. Steel Tower
- Track gauge: 1865–1980: 4 ft 8 1/2 in (1,435 mm) standard gauge; Since 1985: 5 ft 2 1/2 in (1,588 mm) Pennsylvania trolley gauge
- Electrified: 1985
- Tunnel clearance: 18.5 ft (5.6 m)
- Width: 24 ft (7.3 m), 17.4 ft (5.3 m) under U.S. Steel Tower

The Pittsburgh & Steubenville Extension Railroad Tunnel, also known as the Panhandle Tunnel, is a railroad tunnel under downtown Pittsburgh. Opened for rail traffic in 1865, it primarily carried passenger and mail trains under the city center to reach Penn Station. It was built for the Pittsburgh and Steubenville Railroad (commonly known as the Panhandle Route), which was part of the Pennsylvania Railroad system.

By 1979, the tunnel was no longer in regular use due to declining passenger rail ridership. It was purchased by the Port Authority of Allegheny County in 1980 for incorporation into the downtown subway portion of the Pittsburgh Light Rail system.

== History ==
The tunnel has been modified several times since its construction. Shortly after completion, the southern end was lengthened by 79.4 feet (24.2 m) to accommodate an overpass for Forbes Avenue. This lowered the tunnel's vertical clearance to 19.5 feet (5.9 m), 2 feet (0.61 m) lower than the main tunnel. Around 1900, the southern end was extended again to widen Forbes Avenue and add a sidewalk. This extension added 19 feet (5.8 m) to the tunnel and further reduced vertical clearance to 18.5 feet (5.6 m).

During construction of the U.S. Steel Tower in 1965–1967, the northern portal was removed and the tunnel was extended by 409 feet (125 m). This section was 17.4 feet (5.3 m) wide, 6.6 feet (2.0 m) narrower than the main tunnel, and accommodated only a single track. The structural systems for the tunnel and the building were designed to be independent, so that train vibrations would not affect the building and the building load would not be transferred to the tunnel.

The tunnel was primarily used for Panhandle Route passenger and mail trains. Traffic declined as passenger trains were discontinued, and Amtrak became the only regular user from 1971 to 1979, when the New York–St. Louis–Kansas City National Limited was discontinued on October 1 of that year.

== Light Rail ==
Conrail had taken ownership of the line in 1976 after bankruptcy of the Pennsylvania Railroad. Conrail only had limited use for the tunnel.

The tunnel and the adjacent Panhandle Bridge were purchased by the Port Authority from Conrail for $8.15 million in 1980. The tunnel is now utilized by the Pittsburgh Light Rail System for some of its right-of-way and the Steel Plaza Station. The new line opened on July 7, 1985.

== See also ==
- List of tunnels documented by the Historic American Engineering Record in Pennsylvania
- Main Line (Pittsburgh to St. Louis)
- Pittsburgh, Cincinnati, Chicago and St. Louis Railroad
- St. Louis Freight Tunnel, downtown railroad tunnel converted to light rail
