= Panhandle Bridge =

Bridge over the Monongahela River in Pittsburgh, Pennsylvania, U.S.

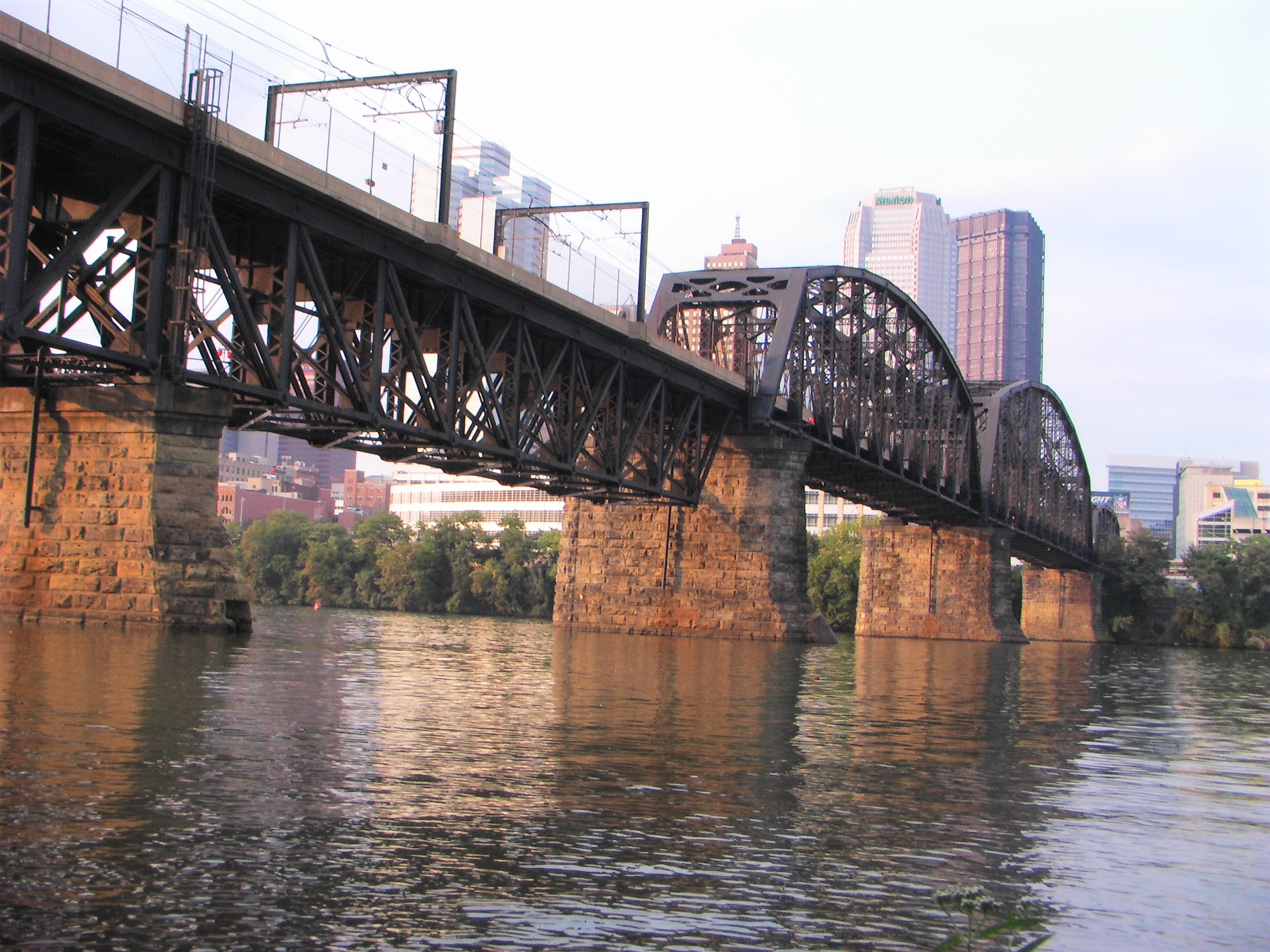
- Coordinates: 40°25′59.12″N 79°59′53.06″W
- Carries: Pittsburgh Light Rail
- Crosses: Monongahela River
- Locale: Pittsburgh, Pennsylvania
- Official name: Monongahela River Bridge

Characteristics
- Design: Truss bridge

History
- Opened: 1903

The Panhandle Bridge (officially the Monongahela River Bridge) carries the three lines of the Port Authority Light Rail Network across the Monongahela River in Pittsburgh, Pennsylvania. The name comes from Pennsylvania Railroad subsidiary Pittsburgh, Cincinnati, Chicago and St. Louis Railroad, also known as the Panhandle Route, which operated over the bridge.

== History ==
The basic structure was built in 1903, and was the third railroad bridge on the site since 1863. It was raised in 1912–1914 as part of a grade separation project. The bridge's function was to carry Panhandle Route passenger, mail and express trains from Pennsylvania Station in Pittsburgh, with a tunnel in between the station and the bridge. Pennsy Panhandle freight trains utilized the Ohio Connecting Bridge slightly downstream on the Ohio River, or went the long way around the West Virginia Panhandle via Conway, Pennsylvania.

Rail traffic over the Panhandle Bridge declined as passenger trains were discontinued, and Amtrak became the only regular user of the bridge from 1971 to 1979, when the New York-St. Louis-Kansas City National Limited was discontinued on October 1 of that year. As PRR successor Conrail had no use for the bridge and the restrictive downtown tunnel, it was sold to the Port Authority, who rebuilt the bridge beginning in 1982 as part of the downtown light rail subway project, which removed trolleys from downtown streets and the Smithfield Street Bridge. PAT (as the Port Authority system was known at the time) light rail cars began using the bridge on July 7, 1985.

== Services ==
The bridge has two tracks, carrying the Blue, Red, and Silver Lines of the Pittsburgh Light Rail system. The tracks connect to the former Pittsburgh & Steubenville Extension Railroad Tunnel to the north, which now carries light rail trains toward their northern terminus at Allegheny station.

At the southern approach to the bridge, its two tracks curve to the west, connecting to Station Square station at the northern portal of the Mount Washington Transit Tunnel. A single track diverges to the east, connecting to the tracks of the former Brown Line, a surface route over Mount Washington via the Allentown neighborhood. The Brown Line route is not used in regular service, but serves as an important alternate route during tunnel closures.

== Gallery ==
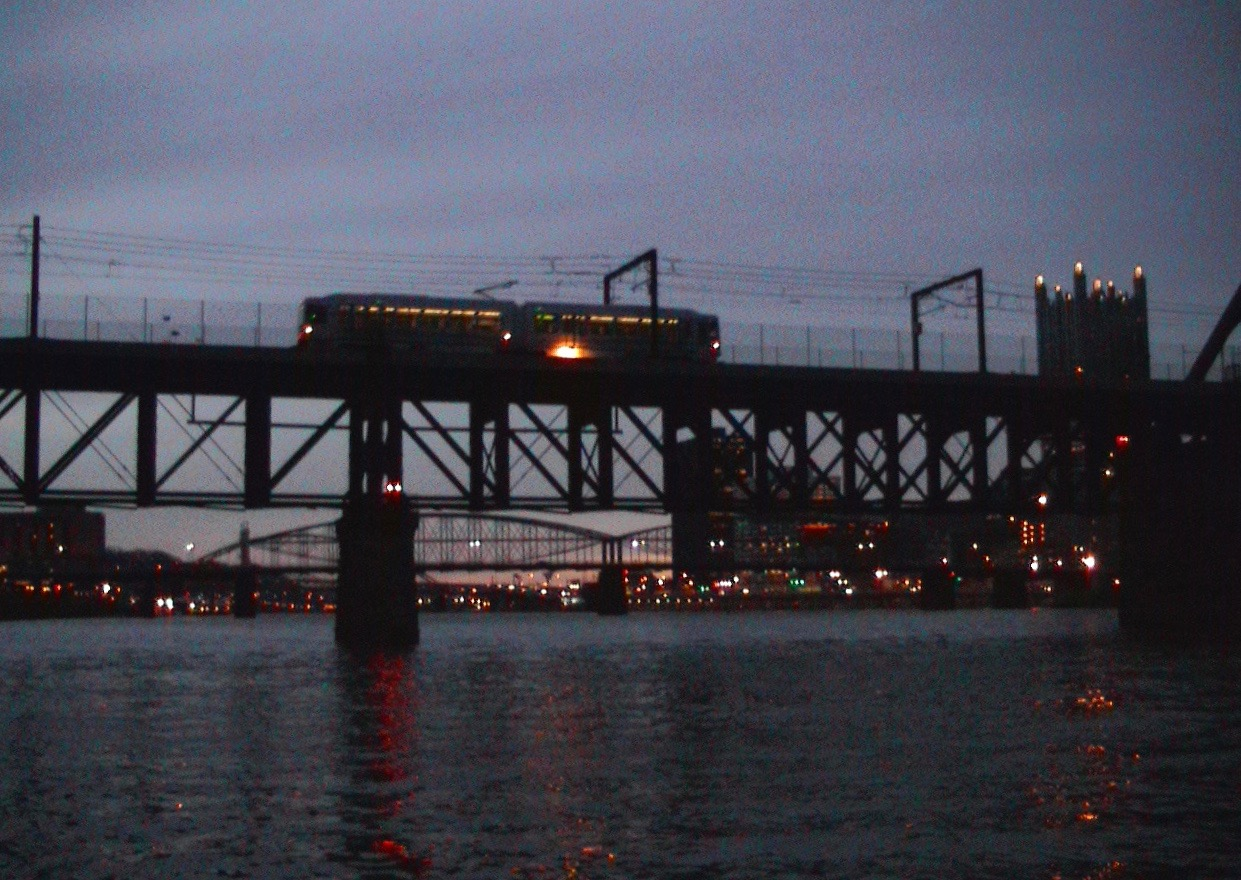
A one-car T Light Rail train crosses the bridge

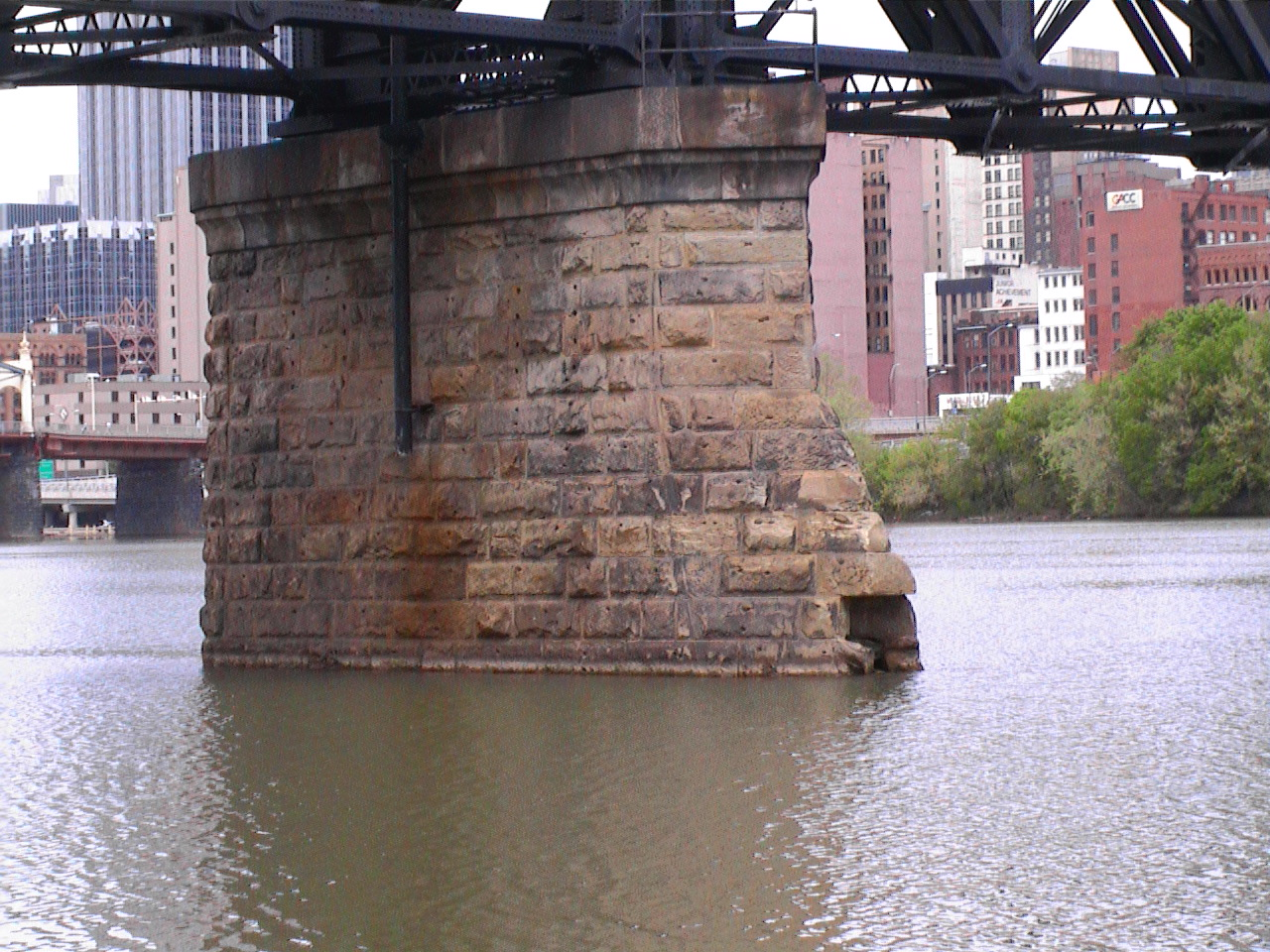
Bridge supports from the river

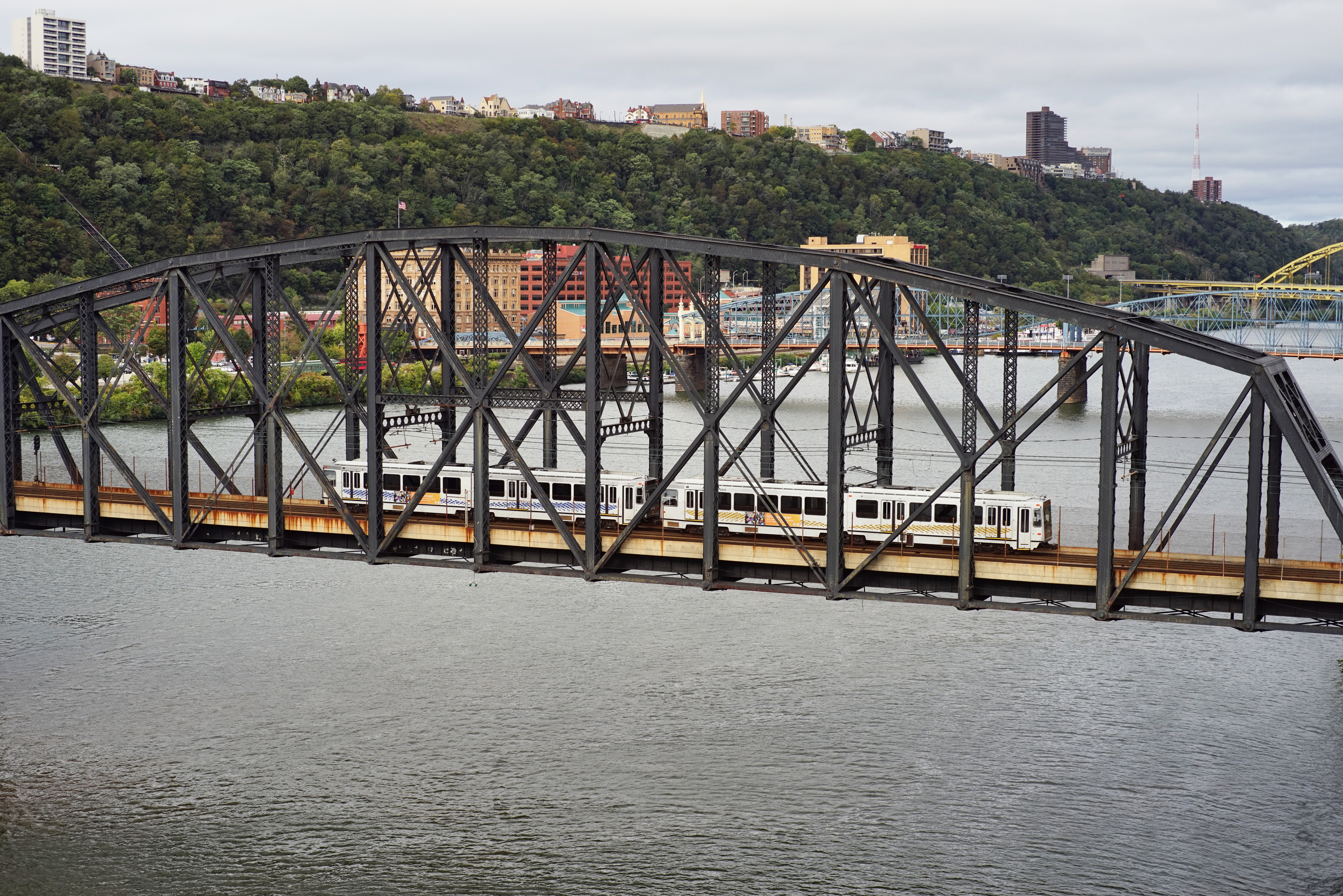
Light rail crossing the bridge

== See also ==
- List of crossings of the Monongahela River
- Pittsburgh & Steubenville Extension Railroad Tunnel
- Pittsburgh, Cincinnati, Chicago and St. Louis Railroad
