= Hartsdale, Indiana =

- Town
- Location in the state of Indiana
- Coordinates: 41°30′28″N 87°28′17″W
- Country: United States
- State: Indiana
- County: Lake
- Township: St. John
- Founded: 1880
- Annexed by Schererville: 1911
- Founder: Aaron Hart
- Named for: Aaron Hart

Area
  - Total: 0.50 sq mi (1.29 km^{2})
- Elevation: 627 ft (191 m)
- Time zone: UTC-6 (CST)
  - Summer (DST): UTC-5 (CDT)
- GNIS feature ID: 0435838

Hartsdale was a town in St. John Township, Lake County, Indiana, United States. It was part of the Chicago metropolitan area. Hartsdale was annexed by Schererville, Indiana, in 1911.

== History ==
Hartsdale took its name from the Hart Farm. Aaron Hart was an early resident of the Schererville-Dyer area. He owned about 20,000 acres of land. Most of the land was useless marshland in the low areas between Lake Michigan's old Glenwood and Calumet Shorelines. Lake George was the name of the body of water on Hart's swamp land, and in 1880 Hart drained the marshy former lake bottom by constructing the Hart Ditch north to the Little Calumet River. He established the Village of Hartsdale one mile north of Schererville.

Two rail lines, the Joliet Cutoff and the Pan Handle passed through Hartsdale. Hartsdale was location to the "Hartsdale" railroad yard and interchange where these rail lines crossed.

In the late 1800s, the Hart farm employed forty employees who helped Hart grow grain, vegetables, raise dairy, beef cattle, and hay.

The founder and land owner Aaron Hart died in a ditch digging accident on January 12, 1883. The town of Hartsdale never grew. By 1900 its neighbor Schererville had its church, two stores, a large brick school, and a population of about 250. Schererville, Indiana, including Hartsdale, was incorporated as a town in 1911, the same year as nearby St. John, Indiana.

Today Route 41 passes right through the middle of the former Village of Hartsdale with a bridge above the Hartsdale rail yard and interchange. The railway interchange is still called "Hartsdale" by the railway operators to reflect the name of the town the interchange was in when named.

Hart Farm Rd still exists on the west side of Route 41 about 1 block north of the Route 41 bridge in Schererville, Indiana.

== Hartsdale Railway History ==
The Joliet Cut-Off railway (Part of Elgin, Joliet and Eastern Railway) was built to bypass the congestion and delay of transferring freight via Chicago. It was leased to the Michigan Central Railroad and service was implemented in July 1855. It allowed businessmen to ship their products from Joliet, Illinois, to the east, avoiding Chicago.

The Pan Handle railroad (Chicago Great Eastern Ohio Railroad part of Pittsburgh, Cincinnati, Chicago and St. Louis Railroad) formed part of the Pennsylvania Railroad system and was put into operation on March 6, 1865.

Hartsdale was located where these railroads intersect.

== Geography ==
Hartsdale was located at 41°30′28″N 87°28′17″W (41.5078135, -87.4714281). Hartsdale was built on marshland after draining Lake George with a man made ditch called Hart's Ditch into the Calumet River.

Lake George and the marshland were located in the low areas between Lake Michigan's old Glenwood Shoreline and Calumet Shoreline.
