= Main Line (Columbus to Indianapolis via Bradford) =

The Columbus to Indianapolis via Bradford Main Line was a rail line owned and operated by the Pennsylvania Railroad in the U.S. state of Ohio.

The line ran from Bradford on the Columbus to Chicago Main Line southwest to New Paris on the Pittsburgh to St. Louis Main Line, forming part of a route between Columbus, Ohio and Indianapolis, Indiana.

== History ==
The line was built by the Richmond and Covington Railroad and opened in 1863. It was eventually leased by the Pittsburgh, Cincinnati and St. Louis Railway on February 1, 1869, placing it under Pennsylvania Railroad control. The PC&StL and its successors, the Pittsburgh, Cincinnati, Chicago and St. Louis Railway and Pittsburgh, Cincinnati, Chicago and St. Louis Railroad, operated the line until January 1, 1921, when the PRR began operating it under lease. The line passed to Penn Central Transportation in 1968 and Conrail in 1976.
