= New Castle District =

The New Castle District is a railroad line owned and operated by the Norfolk Southern Railway in the U.S. states of Ohio and Indiana. The line runs from Evendale northwest and north to Fort Wayne, Indiana along former Pennsylvania Railroad and New York, Chicago and St. Louis Railroad (Nickel Plate) lines. Its south end is at Evendale, where it meets the Dayton District and Indiana and Ohio Railway's Oasis Subdivision. It runs along a piece of CSX Transportation's Toledo Subdivision from Hamilton north to New Miami, Ohio using trackage rights. The New Castle District junctions the Frankfort District at Muncie, Indiana. In Fort Wayne, it crosses the Huntington District and ends at the Chicago District.

== History ==
The Eaton and Hamilton Railroad (in Ohio) and Richmond and Miami Railroad (in Indiana) opened a line from New Miami, Ohio northwest to Richmond, Indiana in 1853, with trackage rights over the Cincinnati, Hamilton and Dayton Railroad from New Miami, Ohio south to Hamilton. Later that year, the Cincinnati, Logansport and Chicago Railway opened, extending northwest from Richmond, Indiana to New Castle. From Hamilton, Ohio south to Evendale, Ohio and beyond to Rendcomb Junction, the Cincinnati and Richmond Railroad opened in 1888. This line from Cincinnati to New Castle, Indiana became part of the Pennsylvania Railroad system through leases and mergers.

The Fort Wayne, Muncie and Cincinnati Railroad became part of the Nickel Plate, absorbed by the Norfolk and Western Railway in 1964. In 1976, when Conrail was formed, the little-used Cincinnati-New Castle line was sold to the N&W. The N&W is now part of Norfolk Southern.
