= Pittsburgh Industrial Railroad =

American short-line railroad, 1996–2000

Overview
- Headquarters: McKees Rocks, Pennsylvania
- Reporting mark: PIR
- Locale: McKees Rocks, Bridgeville, Canonsburg, and Washington
- Dates of operation: 1996–2000
- Successor: Pittsburgh and Ohio Central Railroad

Technical
- Track gauge: 4 ft 8 1/2 in (1,435 mm) standard gauge

The Pittsburgh Industrial Railroad (reporting mark PIR) was a Class III short-line railroad operating about 42 miles of track over the Chartiers Branch in southwest Pennsylvania. It was owned by RailTex, which bought the line from Conrail in 1996. In 2000, after the purchase of RailTex by RailAmerica, the railroad was sold to the Ohio Central Railroad System and renamed the Pittsburgh and Ohio Central Railroad. It is owned by Genesee & Wyoming.

== Interchanges ==
- McKees Rocks
  - Pittsburgh, Allegheny & McKees Rocks Railroad (PAM)
  - CSX
- Duff Junction
  - Norfolk Southern

== Roster ==
Number	Model
2340	SW1200RS
2342	SW1200RS

2342 sold to Pittsburgh and Ohio Central Railroad.
