= James Oliver (inventor) =

American inventor and industrialist (1823–1908)

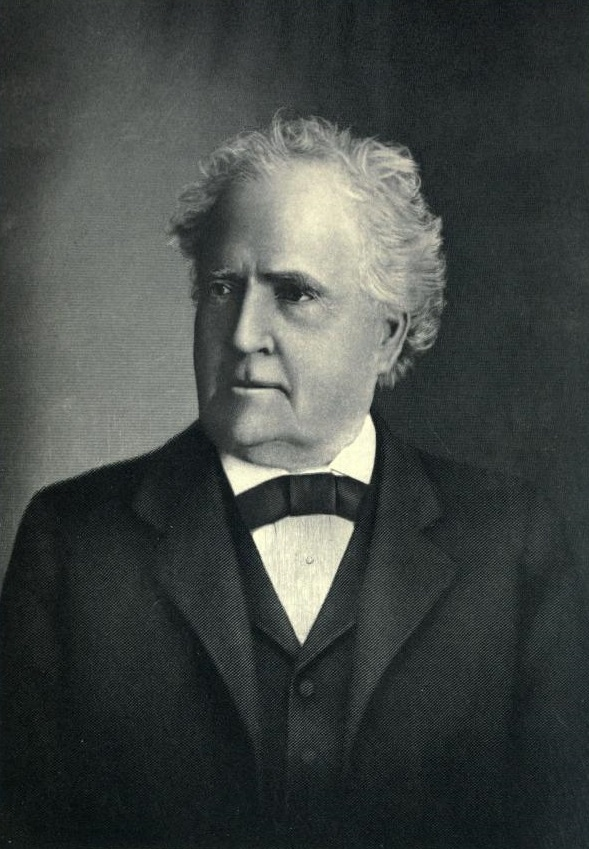
- Portrait of James Oliver
- Born: August 28, 1823; Liddesdale, Scotland
- Died: March 2, 1908 (aged 84); South Bend, Indiana, U.S.
- Occupations: Inventor; industrialist
- Known for: Oliver Chilled Plow
- Spouse: Susan Catherine (m. 1844)
- Children: Joseph D. Oliver

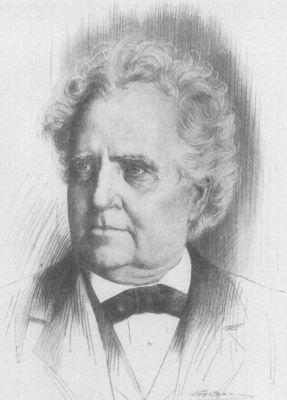
James Oliver

James Oliver (August 28, 1823 – March 2, 1908) was an American inventor and industrialist best known for his creation of the South Bend Iron Works, which was reincorporated as the Oliver Farm Equipment Company after his death. After buying a South Bend, Indiana, foundry with partner Harvey Little in 1855 he began experimenting with improved farm plow designs. Driven by the sales of his popular Oliver Chilled Plow, for which he registered 45 patents during his lifetime, the company grew to become one of the largest in Indiana and one of the world's largest producers of farm plows and horse drawn equipment during the late 19th century.

== Early life ==
James Oliver was born August 28, 1823, in Liddesdale, Scotland, the youngest of the nine children of Mary Irving and George Oliver. His family was Presbyterian and James was taught to read and write in a local church. His father was a shepherd but found it difficult to earn an income to support his family. An outbreak of cholera in 1832 killed most of the family flock, and George injured his leg the following year, making it difficult for him to walk. The family's oldest sons immigrated to the United States in the following years and prepared a home for the rest of the family to join them in 1835. There the family worked on a farm near Alloway, New York, that had been purchased by the sons.

Oliver took a job working on nearby farms performing manual labor and becoming acquainted with field plowing. One of Oliver's sisters married a pioneer who moved to what would become LaGrange County, Indiana. In 1836 James and some of his siblings traveled to live with them on their homestead. The family home was near Mishawaka, Indiana, where a large bog provided an abundance of iron. A number of foundries and iron works were being built in the area and Oliver took a number of jobs working on construction projects. He briefly attended George Merrifield School where he furthered his basic education. He took a job at South Bend Blast Furnace Company in 1839 where he first learned how to cast iron.

Oliver married Susan Catherine on May 30, 1844, the daughter of a fellow laborer. The two bought a log cabin near Mishawaka and lived there for eight months before selling to purchase a new home nearer to town. They purchased a third home in 1852 on a 10-acre (4.0 ha) lot with an orchard.

== Business ==
In 1855 Oliver moved again to South Bend, Indiana, where he entered into a partnership with two businessmen to operate a foundry. His investment gave him a 25% ownership of the foundry. The company was named the South Bend Iron Works, and Oliver oversaw its operations. The business made a fair income, and in 1856 Harvey Little and Oliver bought out the other shares.

Oliver began experimenting with improved field plows. Farm plows of the time were pulled by a draft animal as the farmer walked behind. There were many common problems with the plows: muddy ground could cause soil to become stuck on the upper edges of the plow requiring the farmer to stop and clean the plow before continuing. When large stones were hit at a certain speed, they could cause the plows to break or dent them enough to make them unusable. Oliver's designs sought to resolve both of these issues. He created a molded top edge for the plows allowing it to more easily shed mud away and preventing it from lodging in the harness. He also developed a method of casting the plows in a sand mold which rapidly cooled the outer surface of the metal, causing it to be more significantly hardened, while allowing the center to cool slowly, preventing the plow from becoming brittle. The resulting plow was significantly stronger, retained its cutting edge much longer, and required less cleaning during plowing.

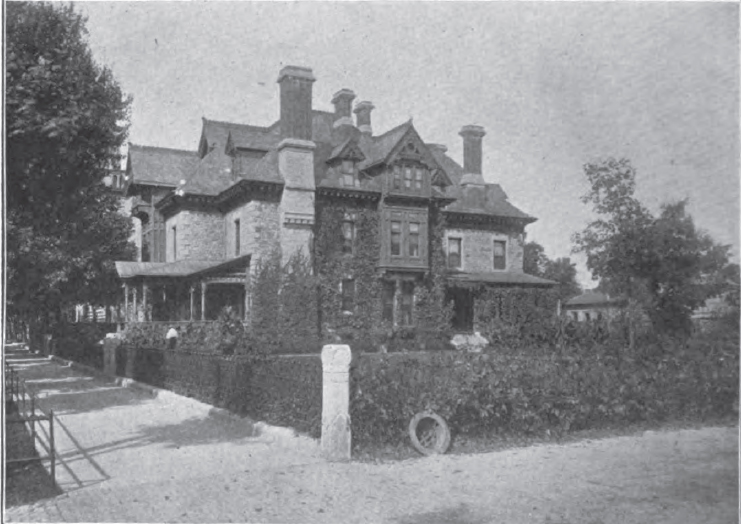
The mansion of James Oliver in South Bend, Indiana

Oliver received a number of patents on his designs and began selling the new plows in 1857. He only sold fifty during that year, but began to market them and demonstrate them at public events. In 1858 he created a model called the "Indiana Plow". By 1860 he had perfected the design, Model No. 40, and sales quickly grew. In August of that year Little and Oliver sold shares of the company to T. M. Bissell. On December 24 of the same year a fire broke out in the foundry completely destroying the building. The company quickly rebuilt, buoyed by their growing sales. Oliver began working as the company's traveling salesman working out distribution agreements. In 1863 Little left the company, which was renamed Oliver and Bissell. Bissell oversaw production, while Oliver concentrated on development. By 1864 the company had grown to employ twenty-five workers and a new investor, George Milburn, was brought in to fund expansion.

Oliver received a new patent in 1868 for a large plow that required a team of draft animals to pull. The new plow was significantly superior to all others on the market, leading to a massive surge in sales. The same year Clement Studebaker, an owner of the Studebaker company, made an investment in the business to help it reincorporate and expand. The company's product grew to dominate its competition and produced as many as 300,000 plows a year; by 1878 the company was exclusively producing plows. A number of specialized models were created for different types of soil. Sales spread internationally, and the company adopted the slogan "Plowmaker of the World". As popularity grew, so did attempts to steal Oliver's designs. He launched several suits to have imitators and patent violators' businesses shut down.

The company began to have competition from John Deere and International Harvester because of Oliver's longtime resistance to producing riding plows, instead focusing only on walk-behind plows. The company remained a leader in farm implements into the twentieth century. Over the years, Oliver was able to purchase all the stock in the business that had been sold to other investors and became the sole owner. The business was a major contributor to the growth of South Bend, Indiana and the surrounding area.

== Death and legacy ==
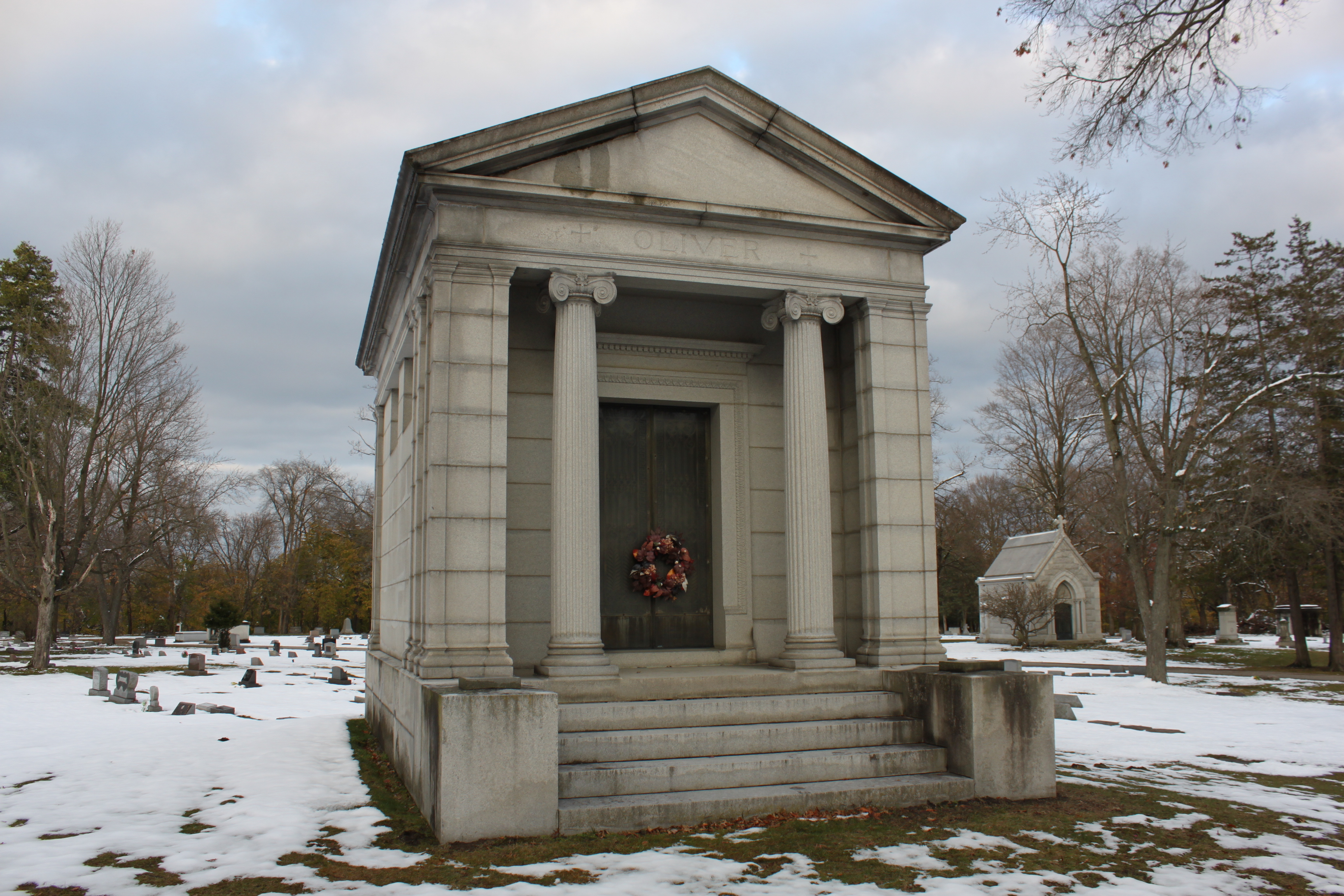
Oliver Mausoleum in Riverview Cemetery

During his lifetime Oliver registered 45 patents on improved plow designs. He and his company were very successful and the company was worth millions of dollars. Oliver died on March 2, 1908, in his South Bend mansion. After a brief ceremony, he was buried in the Riverview Cemetery. He left the company to his family; his son Joseph D. Oliver had been a leading manager of the company for several years. He took the company public in 1912. The company went on to develop mechanized farm equipment and remained a national farm equipment competitor until 1933 when it went through a series of mergers. Today the company is part of the AGCO Allis conglomerate.

== See also ==
- Oliver Farm Equipment Company
- History of South Bend, Indiana
