= Oasis Subdivision =

Rail line in Ohio, United States

The Oasis Subdivision is a rail line in and near eastern Cincinnati. It is owned by the Southwest Ohio Regional Transit Authority (SORTA) and operated by the Indiana and Ohio Railway for freight traffic.

== History ==
The southern part of the line was built by the Little Miami Railroad, the second railroad chartered in Ohio, from 1837 to 1848. In 1870, it came under the control of the Pennsylvania Railroad. The northern part was built by the Cincinnati and Richmond Railroad in 1888, and came under the control of the Pennsylvania Railroad in 1928.

After Pennsylvania Railroad successor Penn Central Transportation went bankrupt, both sections became part of Conrail in 1976, while the remainder of the Cincinnati and Richmond Railroad to the north instead became the Norfolk Southern New Castle District. The remainder of the Little Miami Railroad was closed by 1984 and became the Little Miami Scenic Trail. The connections through Downtown Cincinnati over the Waterfront Belt Line to Queensgate and over the L&N Railroad Bridge to Kentucky were severed in 1984 and 1986 respectively.

Prior to 1994, the land was owned by the City of Cincinnati, and the tracks were owned by Conrail. In 1994, the land and tracks were purchased by the Southwest Ohio Regional Transit Authority (SORTA), with the Indiana and Ohio Railway acquiring usage rights for freight traffic. It was the first of several rail rights-of-way acquired by SORTA to preserve future commuter rail options.

In 2021, an agreement was reached to convert the northerly of two tracks on southern portion of the line into a rail trail, filling a gap in the Ohio River Trail. The agreement involved the Indiana and Ohio Railway giving up its easement on the northern track to SORTA, and the installation of a fence between the southern track and the trail. The rail trail agreement was seen as an impediment to potential commuter rail use.
