= Cincinnati and Richmond Railroad =

Overview
- Locale: Indiana & Ohio
- Dates of operation: 1881–1890
- Predecessors: Cincinnati, Richmond and Chicago Railroad, Richmond and Miami Railway
- Successor: Pittsburgh, Cincinnati, Chicago and St. Louis Railway

The Cincinnati and Richmond Railroad was part of the Pittsburgh, Cincinnati, Chicago and St. Louis Railway system.

== History ==
The Richmond and Miami Railroad was chartered in Indiana on January 19, 1846, to build from Richmond southeast to the Ohio state line. The Eaton and Hamilton Railroad was chartered February 8, 1847 in Ohio to continue the line southeast to Eaton and south to Hamilton. The E&H opened from the Cincinnati, Hamilton and Dayton Railroad north of Hamilton (with trackage rights to Hamilton) to Eaton July 1, 1852, and the rest of the E&H, as well as the R&M, opened May 1, 1853, crossing the state line at Neels, Ohio. With the December 1853 opening of the Cincinnati, Logansport and Chicago Railway from Richmond northwest to New Castle, Indiana, the three lines were operated jointly. On February 1, 1854, the Cincinnati, Hamilton and Dayton Railroad joined, providing a line south to Cincinnati. The Eaton and Hamilton absorbed the Richmond and Miami on December 1, 1854. Joint operations ended December 1, 1856.

The portion in Indiana was sold under foreclosure on January 25, 1862, and reorganized April 30 as the Richmond and Miami Railway. The E&H began operating the R&M October 1. Om May 1, 1863 a branch opened from east of Richmond, Indiana, the R&M's northwest end, east to New Paris at the Ohio state line. The Dayton and Western Railroad leased the branch on March 11 and obtained trackage rights to Richmond, extending their line west from New Paris to Richmond. (The next day, the Columbus and Xenia Railroad leased the D&W.)

The E&H again began operating the R&M November 1, 1864 on a lease dated November 26. The E&H (in Ohio) was sold March 17, 1866 and reorganized April 30 as the Cincinnati, Richmond and Chicago Railroad, under control of the Cincinnati, Hamilton and Dayton Railroad, and still operating the R&M. The CH&D outright leased the CR&C February 18, 1869. The Atlantic and Great Western Railroad, part of the Erie Railway system, leased the Cincinnati, Hamilton and Dayton Railroad, including the CR&C, on March 31, 1869.

The Cincinnati and Richmond Railroad was incorporated December 22, 1881 to continue the line south from Hamilton on its own. That line opened in 1888, running southeast to the Little Miami Railroad at Rendcomb Junction, east of Cincinnati. The CR&C and R&M were merged into the C&R on April 1, 1890.

Most of the line is now the Norfolk Southern Railway New Castle District, although its southernmost portion became part of the Indiana and Ohio Railway Oasis Subdivision.
