= Chartiers Branch =

Railroad branch in Pennsylvania, US

The Chartiers branch of the Pennsylvania Railroad followed Chartiers Creek from Carnegie to Washington, passing Bridgeville, present day Southpointe, and Canonsburg. It is 23.6 miles (38.0 km) long and construction was completed in 1867 and is still in use today, after passing through at least seven different owners.

== History ==
Chartiers Creek was named after Peter Chartier, a trapper of French and Native American parentage who established a trading post at the mouth of Chartiers Creek in 1743. In 1831 the Washington & Pittsburg Railroad was chartered to build a rail link between Pittsburgh and Washington. Chartiers Creek was determined to be the easiest route, but enough financial support was not gathered. The same happened in 1837.

On February 7, 1853, the Chartiers Valley Railroad was formed to fulfill the failed task of the Washington & Pittsburg Railroad. Work was started, but when almost a third done in 1856, funds ran out. The road foreclosed in 1861, and the Right of Way was sold to William Howard a solicitor for the Pennsylvania Railroad (PRR).

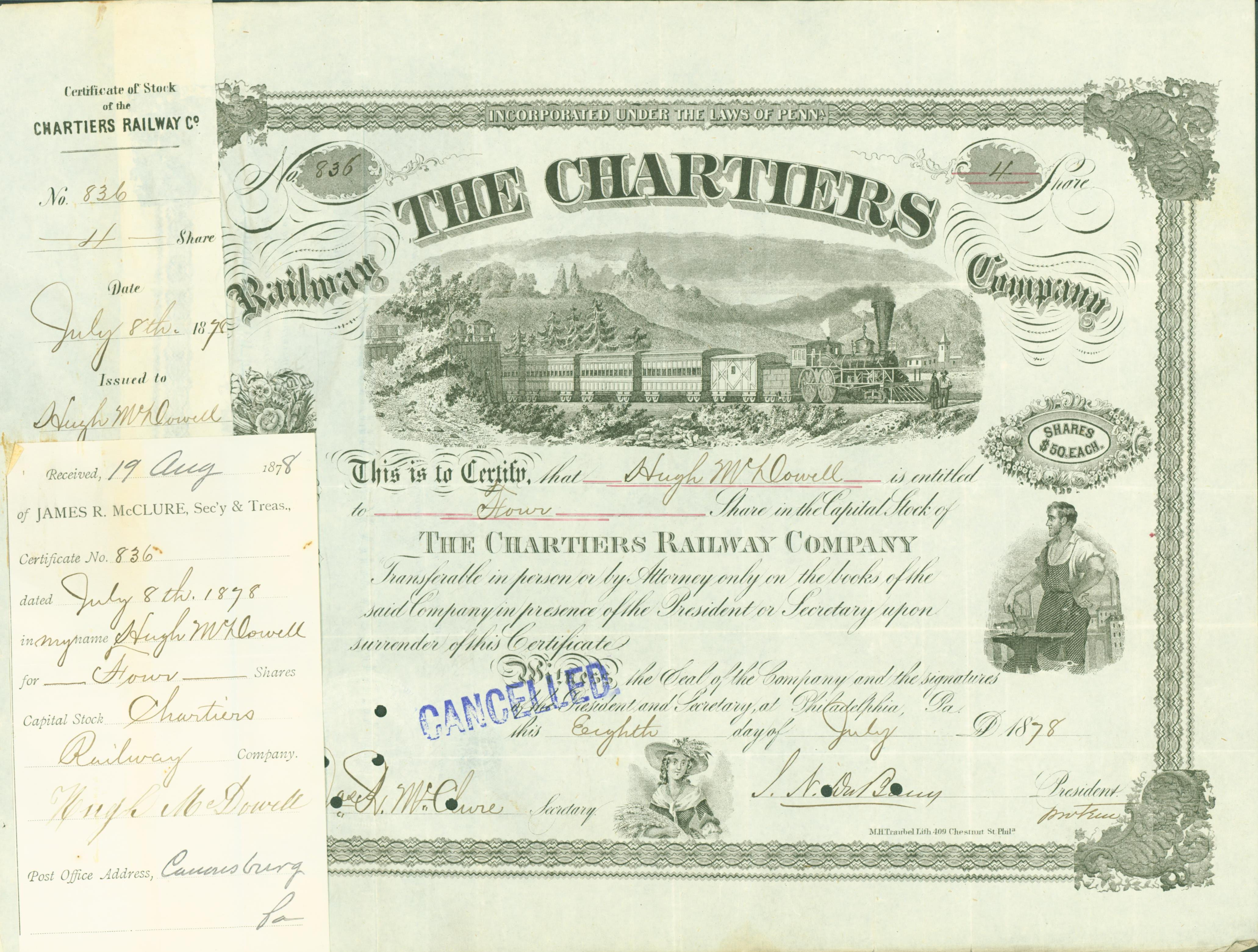
Share of the Chartiers Railway Company, issued 8. July 1878

In 1867, the Chartiers Railway Company was founded, and with PRR backing finished the line. On December 19, 1870, regular service began between Carnegie and Canonsburg. May 18, 1871, saw the beginning of service to Washington.

The line was leased to the Pittsburgh, Cincinnati and St. Louis Railway (PC&StL) on December 8, 1871. The Pittsburgh, Cincinnati, Chicago and St. Louis Railroad (PCC&StL) gained the lease when it was formed and acquired the road on November 20, 1907. The PCC&StL formed part of the PRR system.

Although initially poor, coal fields found in the 1880s proved prosperous. The branch provided revenue even through World War II. However, around this time the coal supply declined and highway access increased. This led to the closing of the B&M branch in 1942. Passenger service to Washington halted on July 20, 1952. The double track changed to a single and stations decreased. The Westland and Palanka branches were abandoned in 1955. On August 4, 1959, the connection with the main line at Carnegie was abandoned for a short run over the Pittsburgh, Chartiers & Youghiogheny Railway trackage rights. Signals were also abandoned and removed at this time.

The Penn Central, as it did for much of its main and secondary track, let the branch fall into disrepair. Conrail took the line over in 1976 and stopped service west of Tylerdale. It was renamed Canonsburg Industrial Track and was put up for sale in 1994.

In 1996, RailTex bought the line and started the Pittsburgh Industrial Railroad (PIR). The PIR lasted for 4 years before being sold to the Ohio Central Railroad System, who formed the Pittsburgh and Ohio Central Railroad (POHC). The POHC is the current owner of the line.

== Branches ==
=== Bridgeville and McDonald Branch ===
The Bridgeville and McDonald branch left from Bridgeville at MP 4 and went to Venice to serve the Bishop Coal Mine. It was abandoned in the early 1990s.

=== Westland Branch ===
The Westland Branch left Houston at MP 15.3 and went to Westland coal mine (Midland #3). It was abandoned in 1955.

==== Palanka Branches ====
Two branches left the Westland branch to serve the Palanka mines.

== Connections ==
- Waynesburg and Washington Railroad at the end of the line
- Montour Railroad at Hills (MP 8.6)
- Pittsburgh and West Virginia Railroad had a mile west of Bridgeville (off the B&W)
- Pittsburgh, Chartiers and Youghiogheny Railway
