= Pittsburgh and Ohio Central Railroad =

Short line railroad in southwestern Pennsylvania, U.S.

Overview
- Parent company: Genesee & Wyoming
- Headquarters: McKees Rocks, Pennsylvania
- Reporting mark: POHC
- Locale: McKees Rocks, Bridgeville, Canonsburg, and Washington
- Dates of operation: 2000–

Technical
- Track gauge: 4 ft 8 1/2 in (1,435 mm) standard gauge
- Length: 37 miles (60 km)

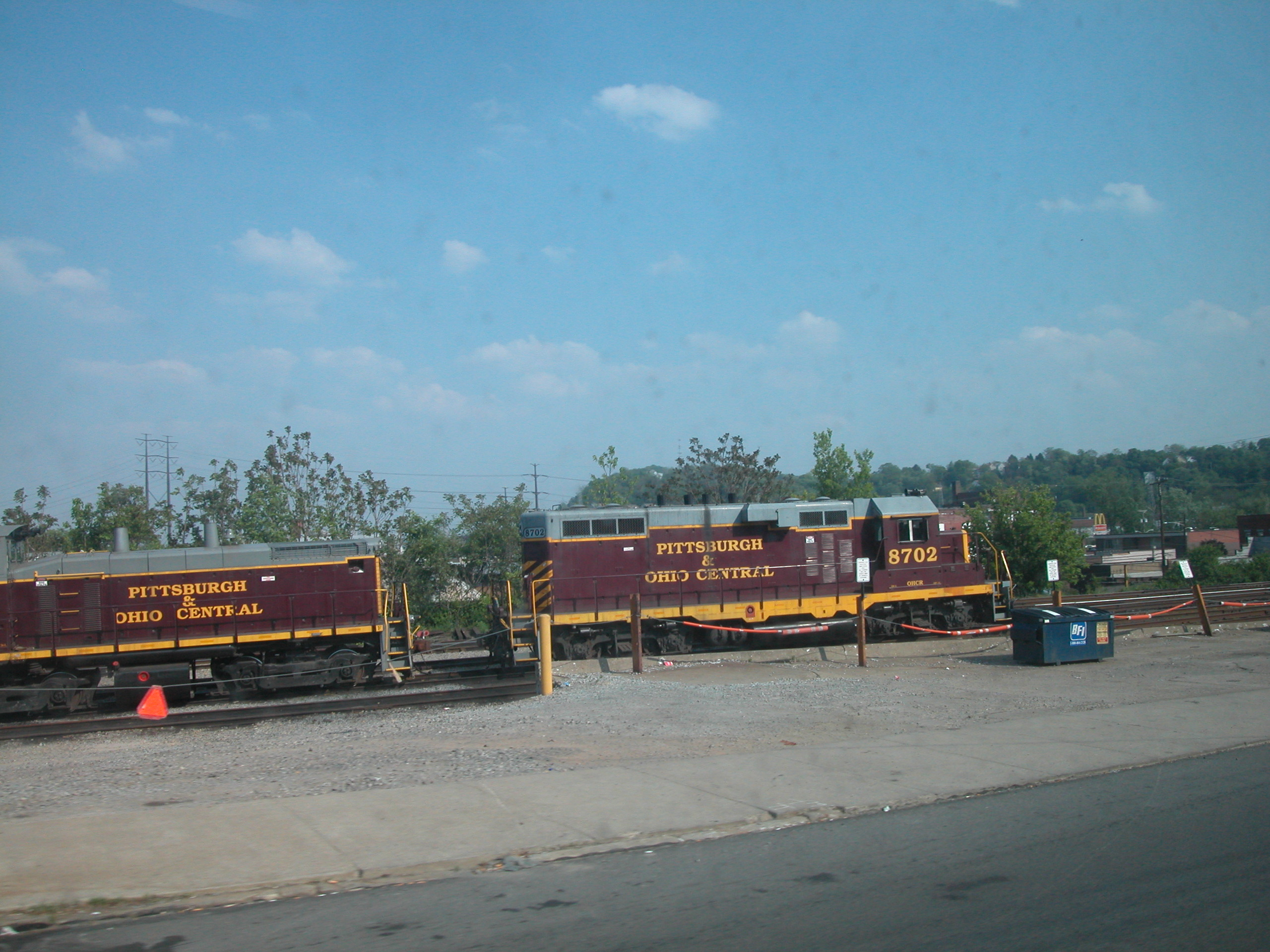
Two Pittsburgh and Ohio Central locomotives in 2007.

The Pittsburgh and Ohio Central Railroad (reporting mark POHC) is a short-line railroad operating 37 miles (60 km) of track over the Chartiers Branch in southwest Pennsylvania. It also operated a small portion of the former Conrail Panhandle Route between Carnegie and Walkers Mill. This line, however, has not been used since 2014. It is owned by the Ohio Central Railroad System, which is a division of the rail holding company Genesee & Wyoming.

The P&OHC was formed after the purchase by Genesse & Wyoming of the former Pittsburgh Industrial Railroad from RailAmerica in 2000. The line has track extending from its office in the McKees Rocks north to Neville Island and south to Arden in South Strabane Township, with a spur from Carnegie to Rennerdale. Major commodities hauled include chemicals, minerals, plastics, and steel.

== Interchanges ==
- McKees Rocks
  - Pan Am Railways
- Pov Junction
  - CSX
- Duff Junction
  - Norfolk Southern

== Roster (as of June 2014) ==
Number	Model
1545	SW1500
1547	SW1500
8702	GP11
706	GP10
1402	GS1400
2075-2505	GP38-2, ex NS, née N&W
2402	SW1500, ex-Pittsburgh Industrial Railroad
