= Pittsburgh, Cincinnati, Chicago and St. Louis Railroad =

Railroad in the United States (1917–1956)

Overview
- Locale: Illinois, Indiana, Ohio, Pennsylvania & West Virginia
- Dates of operation: January 1, 1917–April 1, 1956
- Predecessor: Pittsburgh, Cincinnati, Chicago and St. Louis Railway; Vandalia Railroad; Pittsburgh, Wheeling and Kentucky Railroad; Anderson Belt Railway; & Chicago, Indiana and Eastern Railway
- Successor: Philadelphia, Baltimore and Washington Railroad

Technical
- Track gauge: 4 ft 8 1/2 in (1,435 mm) standard gauge

Pittsburgh, Cincinnati, Chicago and St. Louis Railway
Overview
- Locale: Illinois, Indiana, Ohio, Pennsylvania & West Virginia
- Dates of operation: December 22, 1853 (oldest predecessor line); September 20, 1890–December 31, 1916
- Predecessor: Pittsburgh, Cincinnati and St. Louis Railway; Chicago, St. Louis and Pittsburgh Railroad; Cincinnati and Richmond Railroad; & Jeffersonville, Madison and Indianapolis Railroad
- Successor: Pittsburgh, Cincinnati, Chicago and St. Louis Railroad

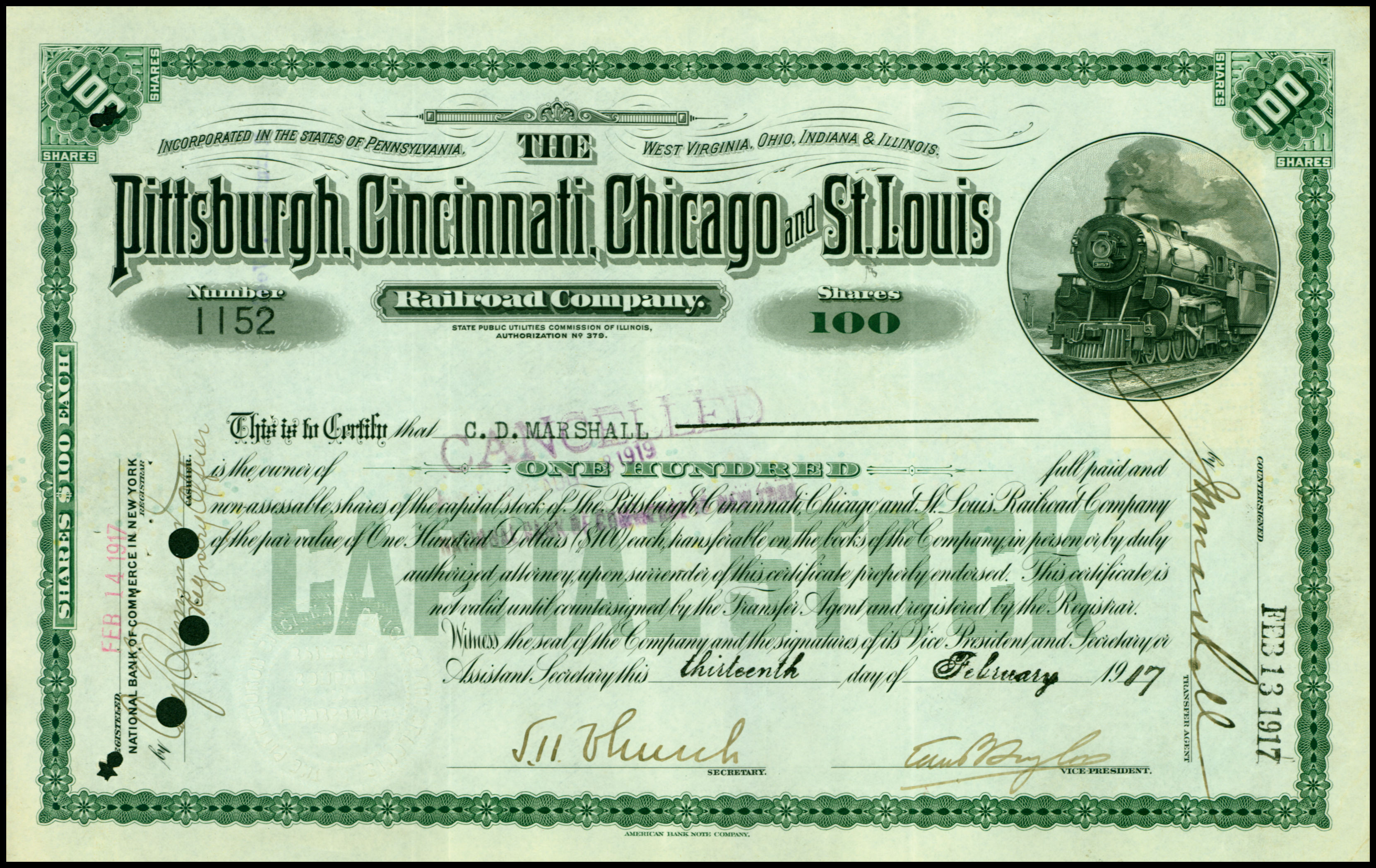
Share of the Pittsburgh, Cincinnati, Chicago and St. Louis Railroad Company, issued 13. February 1917

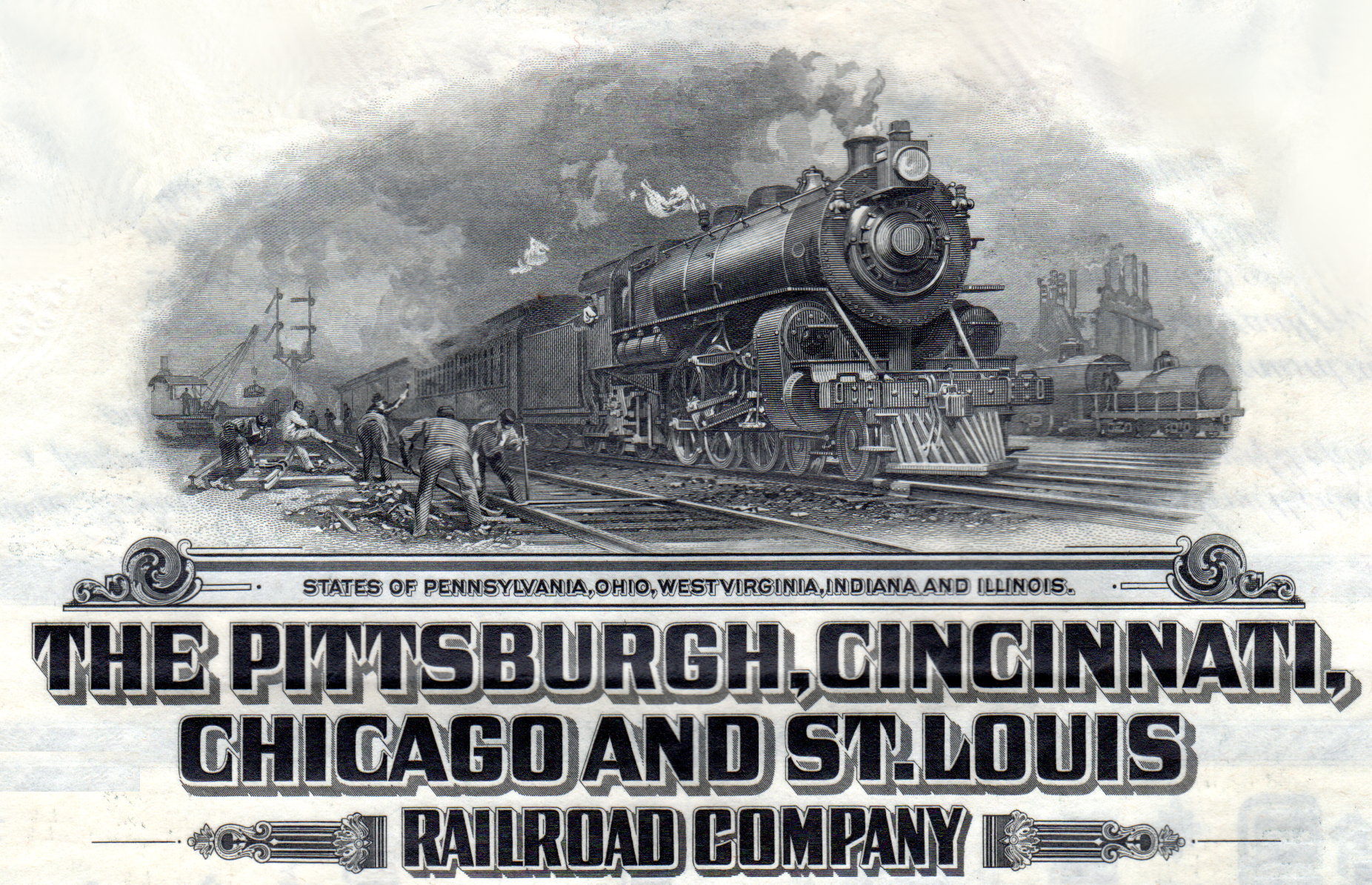
Pittsburgh, Cincinnati, Chicago, St. Louis Railroad bond, 1920, detail

The Pittsburgh, Cincinnati, Chicago and St. Louis Railroad, commonly called the Pan Handle Route (Panhandle Route in later days), was a railroad that was part of the Pennsylvania Railroad system. Its common name came from its main line, which began at Pittsburgh, Pennsylvania, crossed the Northern Panhandle of West Virginia, and continued west to Bradford, Ohio, where it split into a northern line to Chicago and a southern one through Indianapolis, Indiana, to East St. Louis, Illinois.

== History ==
=== Pittsburgh to Columbus (1848–1869) ===
The Steubenville and Indiana Railroad was chartered February 24, 1848, in Ohio to build west from the Ohio River at Steubenville to the Indiana state line between Willshire and Fort Recovery, via Mount Vernon. On March 12, 1849, it was authorized to build a bridge at Steubenville and a branch to Columbus.

The line began construction in late October 1851. Work occurred along the entire length of the line at the same time.

The first section opened December 22, 1853, from Steubenville west to Unionport. On February 2, 1854, an extension from Unionport west to Cadiz Junction opened; the branch to Cadiz opened June 12. Further extensions west from Cadiz Junction opened June 22 to Masterville, July 12 to Bowerston, and April 11, 1855, the rest of the way to Newark. However, it did not yet connect to any other railroads in Newark.

On December 25, 1854, the S&I came to an agreement with the Central Ohio Railroad to use its tracks from Newark west to Columbus. Some surveying had been done for a separate route via Granville. The connection at Newark opened April 16, 1857, and was built with funds provided by the Columbus and Xenia Railroad, which helped provide a through route to Cincinnati from the S&I. In 1864, the S&I outright bought a half interest in the Newark–Columbus track.

The Pittsburgh and Steubenville Railroad was chartered March 24, 1849, in Pennsylvania to build west from the Monongahela River near Pittsburgh to the Virginia (now West Virginia) state line towards the Steubenville and Indiana Railroad. It was authorized to extend across the Monongahela to Pittsburgh on April 21, 1852. The Western Transportation Company was incorporated by the Pennsylvania Railroad in Pennsylvania on March 15, 1856, to build and operate the P&S.

On July 22, 1853, the president of the S&I deeded right-of-way he had bought from 36 landowners across the Virginia Panhandle to the P&S. This allowed the railroad to build without a charter, which was required to use eminent domain; the powerful city of Wheeling had opposed the P&S, which bypassed Wheeling. The private Edgington and Wells Railroad (named after its owners, Jesse Edgington and Nathaniel Wells of Brooke County) opened July 4, 1854, but failed later that year, as it did not connect to any other railroads. The Holliday's Cove Rail Road was chartered by the Western Transportation Company on March 30, 1860, in Virginia to build across the Panhandle near what is now Weirton, West Virginia; the charter was only used to build the Steubenville Railroad Bridge. The next day the Wheeling Railroad Bridge Company was chartered by the same company, as a political promise to allow the incorporation of the HCRR.

The full P&S opened October 9, 1865, from Smithfield Street in Pittsburgh west to Wheeling Junction at the east end of the Steubenville Railroad Bridge. That same day, the Steubenville Railroad Bridge opened over the Ohio River, connecting the S&I and P&S, as did the connection at Pittsburgh, connecting the Pennsylvania Railroad with the P&S via the Monongahela River Bridge (commonly called the Panhandle Bridge) and Grant's Hill Tunnel. From then until 1868, the line was operated as the Pittsburgh, Columbus and Cincinnati Railroad by the Western Transportation Company.

The P&S was sold under foreclosure on November 6, 1867, to the Panhandle Railway, which had been chartered April 8, 1861. On April 30, 1868, the PHRy, S&I and HCRR merged to form the Pittsburgh, Cincinnati and St. Louis Railway, and the Western Transportation Company was dissolved soon after.

=== Columbus to Indianapolis (1847–1867) ===
The Terre Haute & Richmond Railroad was chartered in 1847 to build across Indiana via Indianapolis. On May 25, 1850, stockholders east of Indianapolis organized the Terre Haute & Richmond Railroad (East of Indianapolis). On January 20, 1851, that section, from Indianapolis east to the Ohio state line, was renamed the Indiana Central Railway. On January 31, an Ohio law authorized the Dayton and Western Railroad to unite with the Indiana Central and operate jointly. The line from Indianapolis east to Greenfield opened in September 1853, and on October 8 it was completed to the state line, where it connected with the Dayton and Western. Joint operation of both lines between Indianapolis and Dayton, Ohio, began August 1, 1854. In 1859 the rail gauge was changed from standard gauge to the broader Ohio gauge (4 ft 10 in or 1,473 mm) to allow for direct connections with the Little Miami Railroad and Columbus and Xenia Railroad at Dayton.

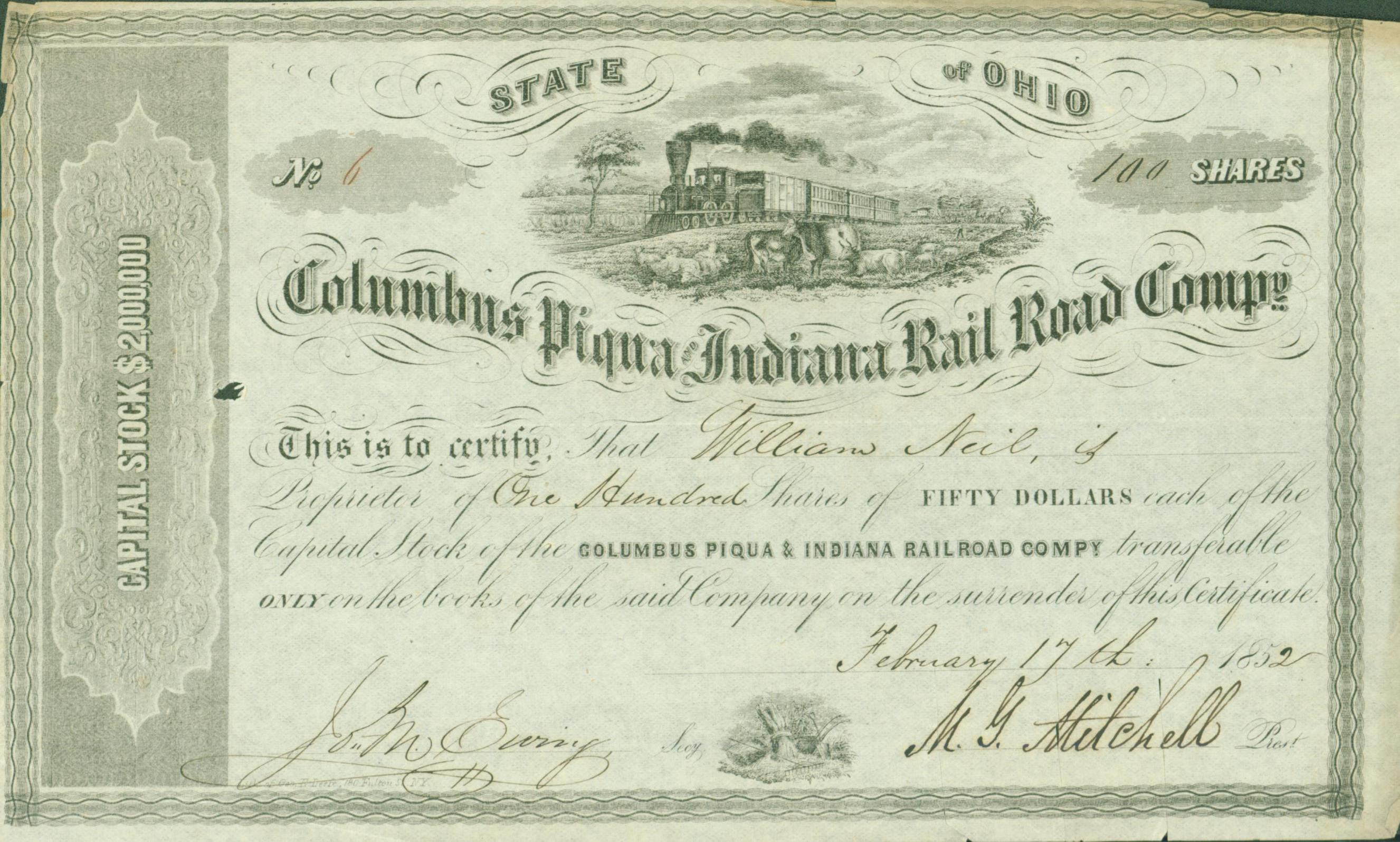
Share of the Columbus Piqua & Indiana Rail Road Company, issued 17 February 1852

The Columbus Piqua & Indiana Railroad was chartered in Ohio on February 23, 1849, to build from Columbus west via Urbana, Piqua and Greenville to the Indiana state line. On March 21, 1851, the CP&I was authorized to change the route west of Covington, and a more northerly alignment was chosen to meet the Indianapolis and Bellefontaine Railroad at Union City, Indiana, for access to Indianapolis. The first section, from Columbus west to Plain City, opened June 6, 1853. Extensions opened to Urbana September 19 and Piqua October 16, 1854; on the latter date it changed its track gauge to Ohio gauge (4 ft 10 in or 1,473 mm) to connect with the Indianapolis and Bellefontaine, which had also re-gauged. The rest of the line to Union City opened March 25, 1859, after some financial problems. The CP&I was sold at foreclosure on August 6, 1863, and reorganized October 30 as the Columbus and Indianapolis Railroad.

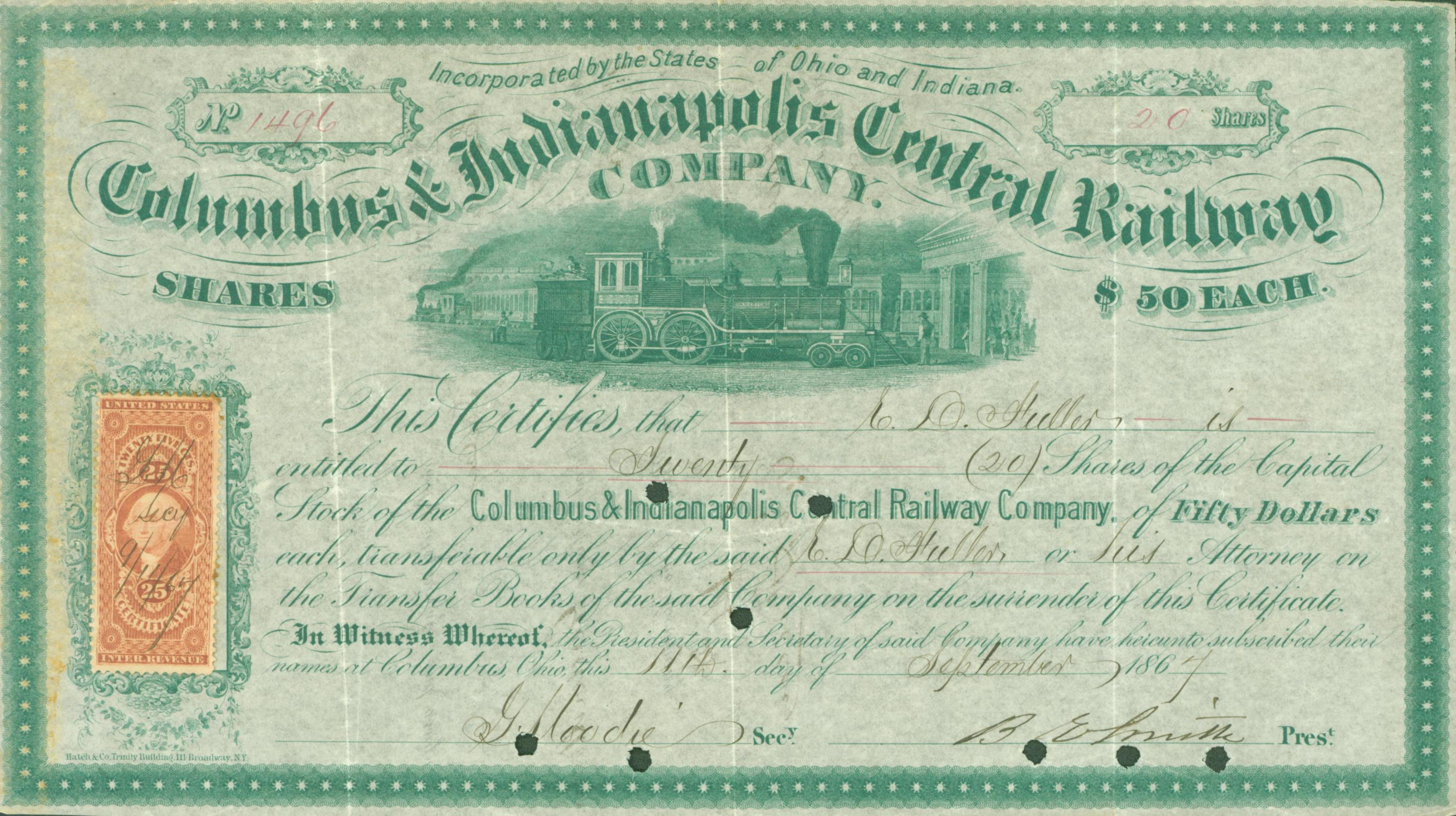
Share of the Columbus & Indianapolis Central Railway Company, issued 17 September 1867

The Richmond and Covington Railroad was chartered in Ohio by the Indiana Central Railway and Columbus Piqua and Indiana Railroad on March 12, 1862, to build a branch of the latter from Bradford to the former at the Indiana state line near New Paris. The R&C opened in early 1863, and the Indiana Central's joint operating contract with the Dayton and Western Railroad was dissolved on March 9. On January 10, 1864, the IC, C&I and R&C signed an agreement for joint operation as the Great Central Line between Columbus and Indianapolis, headed by the Indiana Central. The C&I bought the R&C on September 5, 1864. The Indiana Central Railway and Columbus and Indianapolis Railroad merged October 19 to form the Columbus and Indianapolis Central Railway, with a main line from Columbus to Indianapolis and a branch from Bradford, Ohio, to Union City, Indiana.

=== Richmond to Chicago (1848–1865) ===
The New Castle and Richmond Railroad was chartered February 16, 1848, in Indiana to build a line from New Castle east via Hagerstown and Greens Fork to Richmond. The company was authorized on January 24, 1851, to extend northwest beyond New Castle to Lafayette. On February 26, 1853, it was renamed the Cincinnati, Logansport and Chicago Railway to better reflect its expanded role. The original line opened between New Castle and Richmond in December 1853, and it was operated jointly with the Richmond and Miami Railroad and Eaton and Hamilton Railroad, which continued the line southwest to Hamilton, Ohio. The Cincinnati, Hamilton and Dayton Railroad, connecting Hamilton to Cincinnati, joined the operations on February 1, 1854.

The Cincinnati, Cambridge and Chicago Short Line Railway was incorporated in Indiana on January 25, 1853, to build from New Castle southeast via Cambridge to the Ohio state line; the Cincinnati, New Castle and Michigan Railroad was incorporated April 11 of the same year to build northwest from New Castle towards St. Joseph, Michigan. The two companies merged May 1, 1854, to form the Cincinnati and Chicago Railroad. On October 10, 1854, the Cincinnati, Logansport and Chicago Railway was merged into the Cincinnati and Chicago Railroad. The unfinished line between Richmond and Logansport was leased to John W. Wright and Company on October 16, 1856. That company began operating it on December 1, and the joint operation towards Cincinnati ended. The full line between Richmond and Logansport opened on July 4, 1857. That line was sold at foreclosure on April 28, 1860, and reorganized July 10 as the Cincinnati and Chicago Air-Line Railroad. Grading had been done from Wabash southeast to the Ohio state line; portions were later sold to the Fort Wayne and Southern Railroad and Connersville and New Castle Junction Railroad.

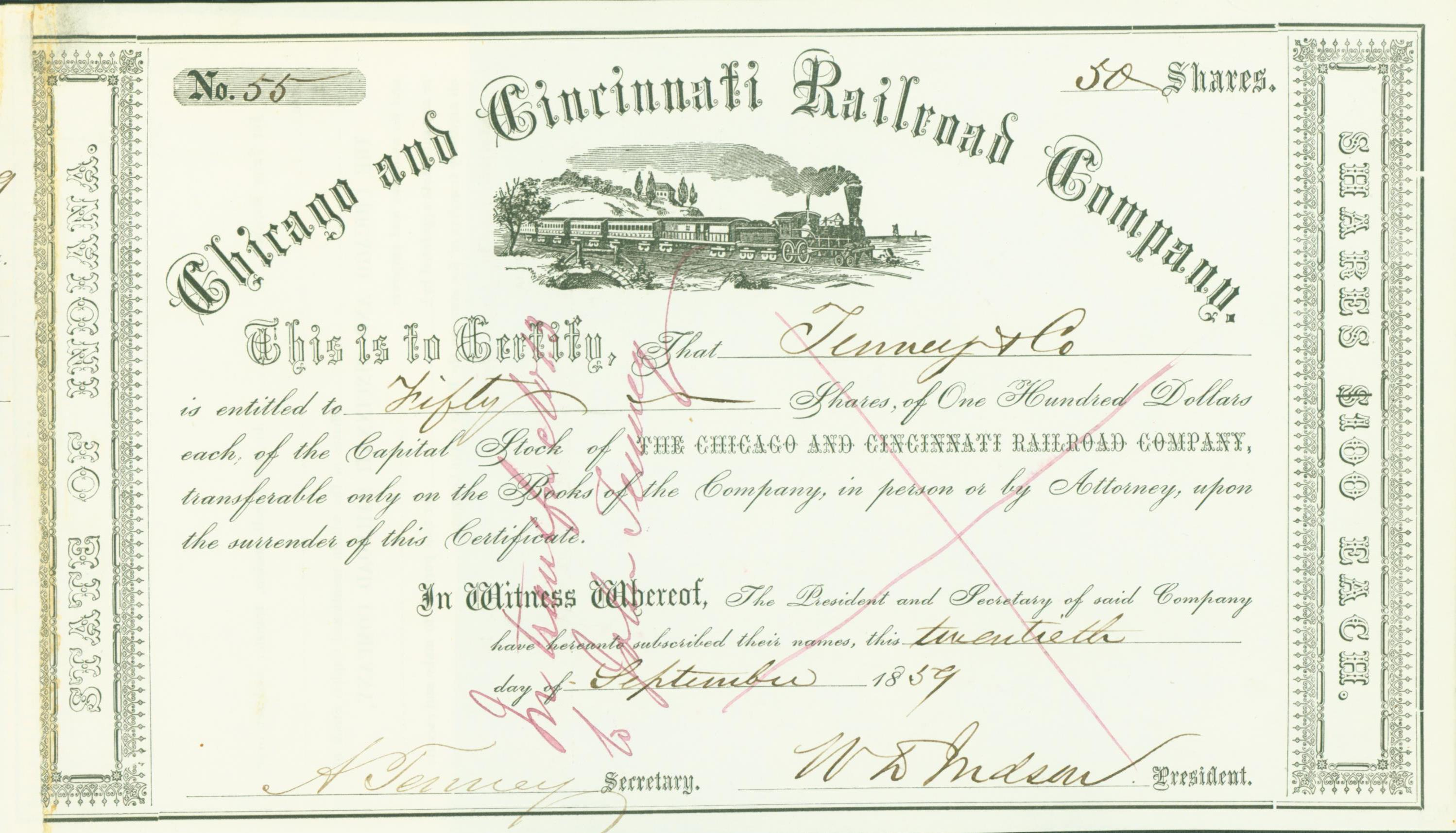
Share of the Chicago and Cincinnati Railroad Company, issued 20. September 1859

On September 25, 1857, the Chicago and Cincinnati Railroad was chartered in Indiana to build a line from Logansport northwest to Valparaiso. That line opened in 1861, connecting at Valparaiso with the Pittsburgh, Fort Wayne and Chicago Railway to Chicago. The Cincinnati and Chicago Air-Line opened a bridge over the Wabash River at Logansport on September 25, 1861, connecting it to the Chicago and Cincinnati. Joint operation between Richmond and Chicago began July 1, 1862, and ended January 29, 1865.

=== Realignments towards Chicago and mergers (1857–1869) ===
The Galena and Illinois River Railroad was chartered in Illinois on February 18, 1857, to build from Galena through Chicago to the Indiana state line towards Lansing, Michigan. The Chicago and Great Eastern Railway was incorporated in Indiana on June 19, 1863, to build from Logansport northwest to the Illinois state line towards Chicago. The charter of the G&IR was assigned to the C&GE on September 11, 1863, and the C&GE absorbed the G&IR on October 30. The line from Chicago (12th Street) south and southeast to the Chicago and Cincinnati at La Crosse, Indiana, opened March 6, 1865, and the old line northwest from La Crosse to Valparaiso was abandoned. On May 15, 1865, the C&GE absorbed the Cincinnati and Chicago Air-Line Railroad and Chicago and Cincinnati Railroad.

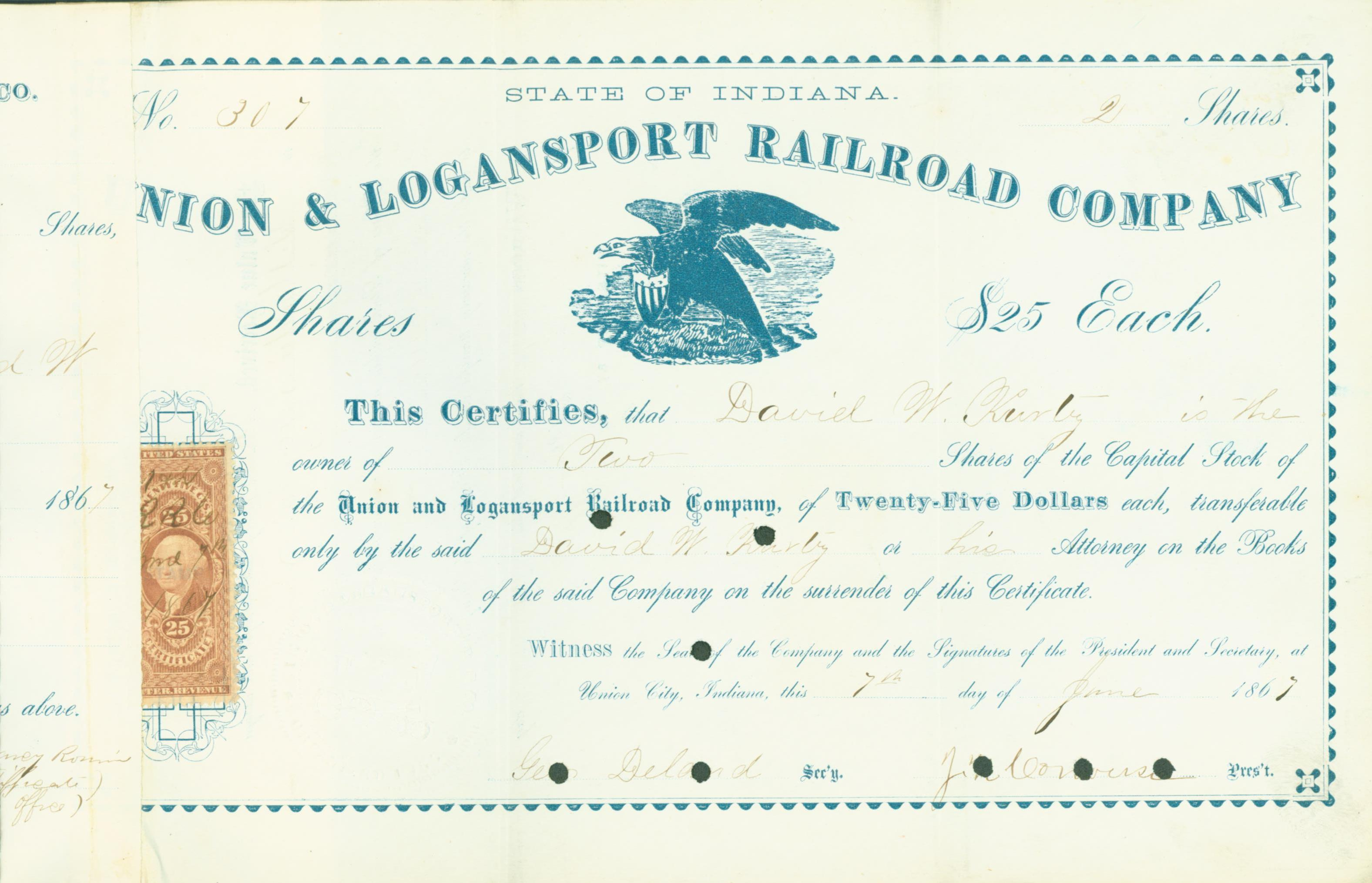
Share of the Union & Logansport Railroad Company, issued 7 June 1867

The Marion and Mississinewa Valley Railroad was incorporated in Indiana on May 11, 1852, to build from Union City northwest to Marion. On May 14, 1853, the Marion and Logansport Railroad was incorporated to continue northwest from Marion to Logansport. The M&L conveyed its property to the M&MV on November 28, 1854. The Union and Logansport Railroad was incorporated January 5, 1863, and bought the unfinished M&MV on January 9.

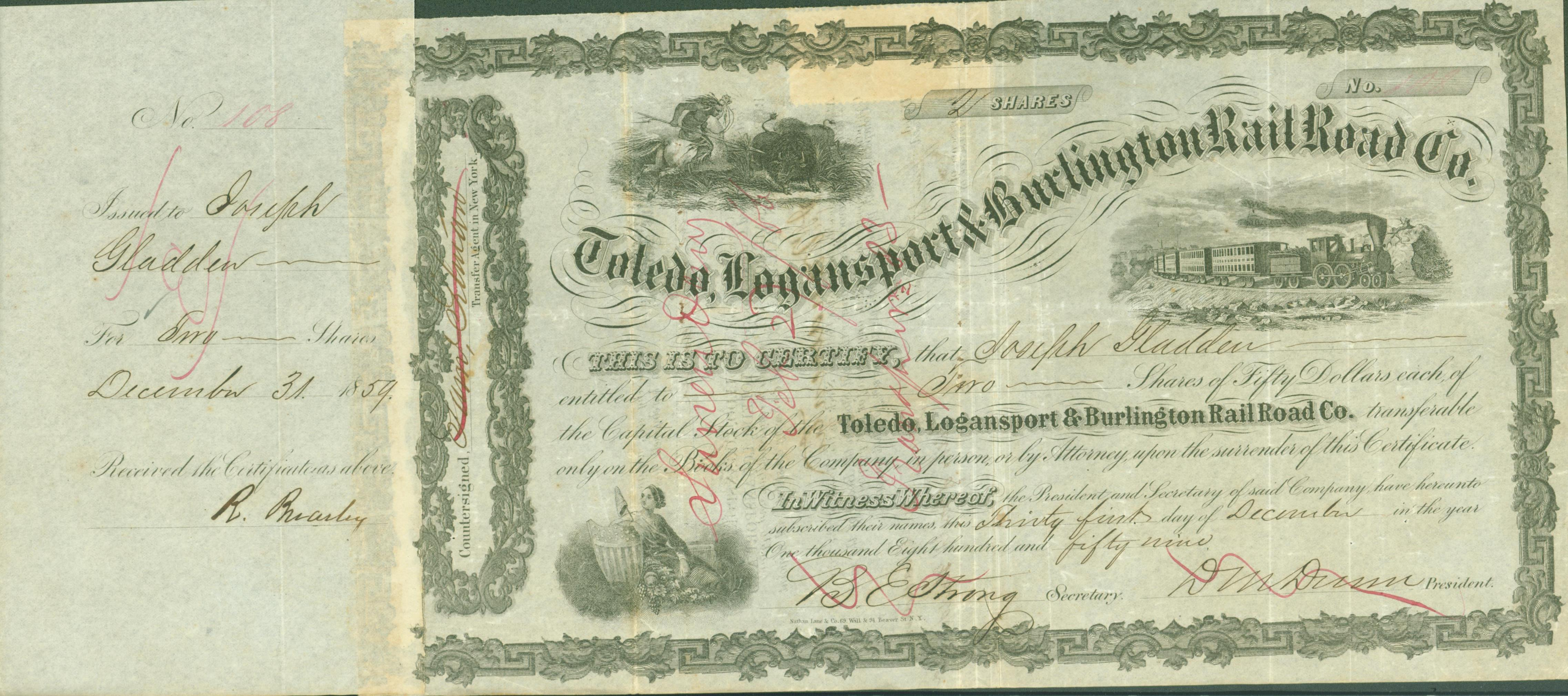
Share of the Toledo, Logansport & Burlington Rail Road Company, issued 31 December 1859

In the meantime, the Logansport and Pacific Railroad was incorporated in 1853 to build from Logansport west to the Illinois state line. After several reorganizations, the Toledo, Logansport and Burlington Railroad opened to the Illinois state line near Effner in 1859. The Logansport, Peoria and Burlington Railroad continued as part of a line to the U.S. West, bypassing Chicago, on a route that later became the Toledo, Peoria and Western Railway.

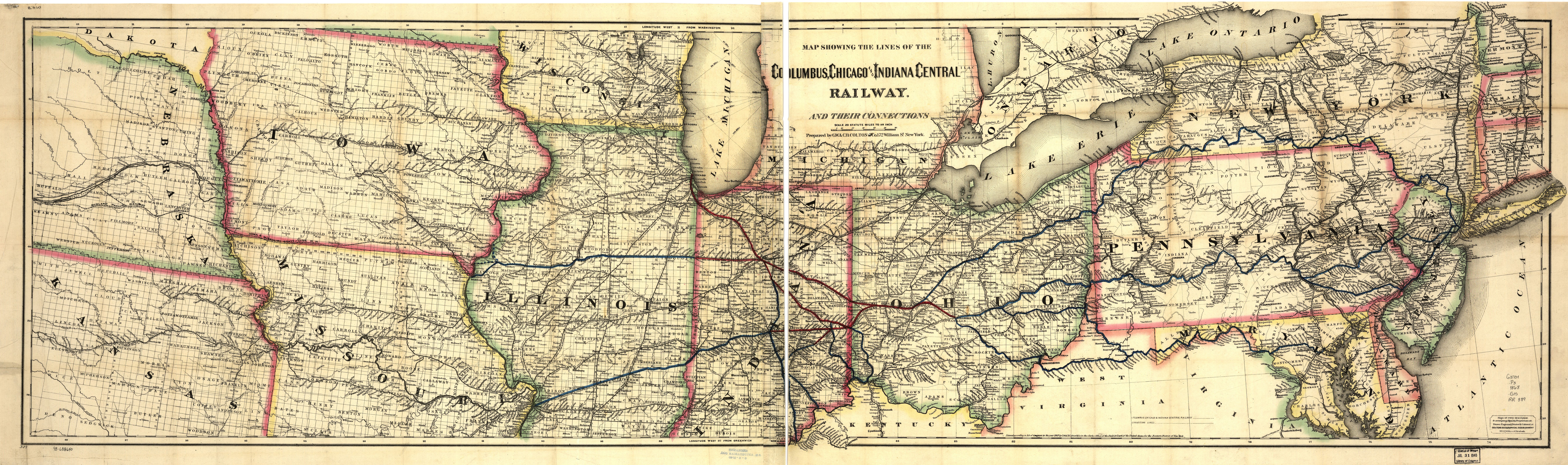
1868 map of the Columbus, Chicago and Indiana Central Railway

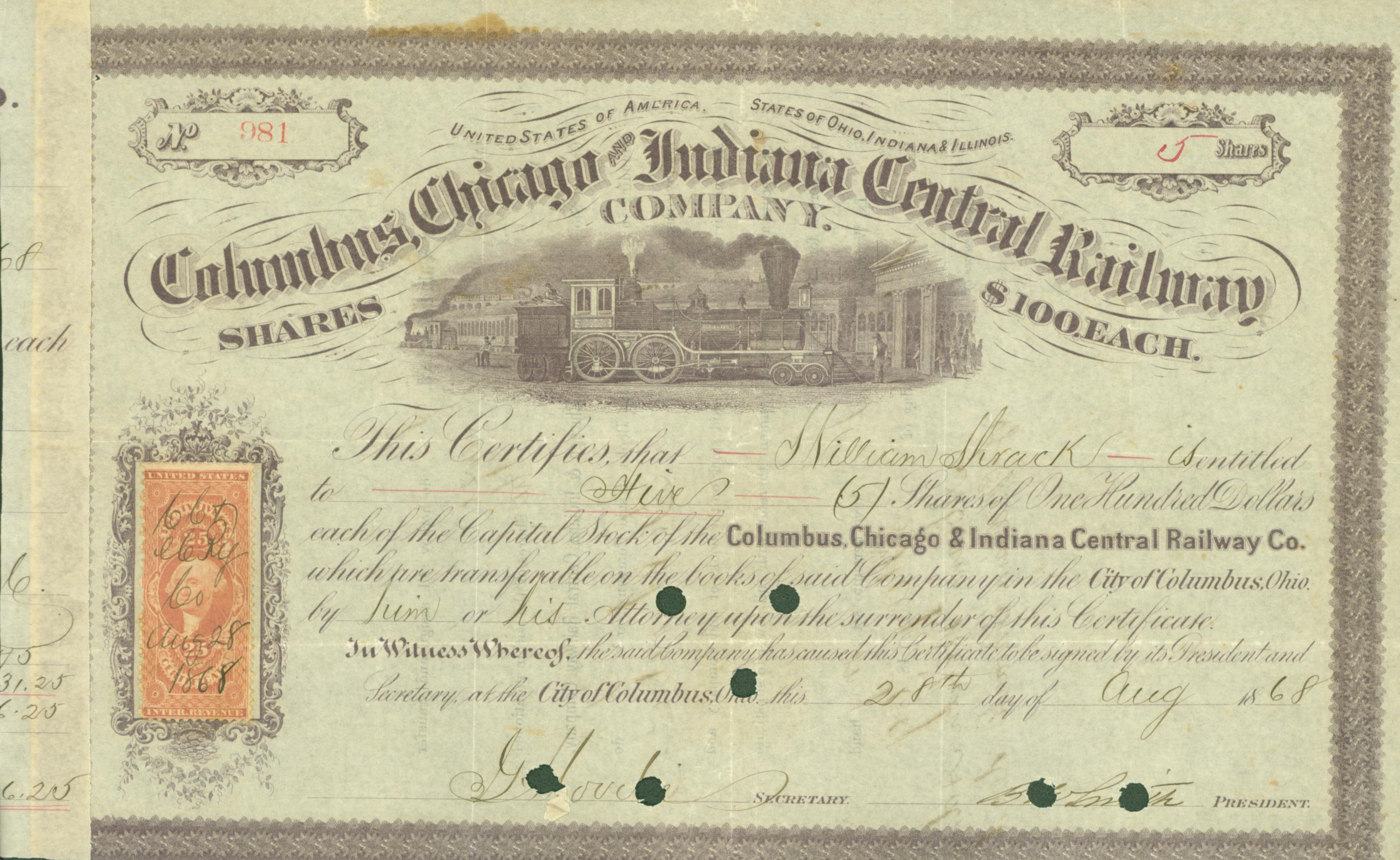
Share of the Columbus, Chicago and Indiana Central Railway Company, issued 21 August 1868

On September 11, 1867, the Columbus and Indianapolis Central Railway, Union and Logansport Railroad and Toledo, Logansport and Burlington Railway merged to form the Columbus and Indiana Central Railway. The main line, formerly being built by the Union and Logansport, opened from Union City to Marion in October 1867.

On February 12, 1868, the Columbus, Chicago and Indiana Central Railway was formed as a merger of the Columbus and Indiana Central Railway and Chicago and Great Eastern Railway. The rest of the new main line, from Marion northwest to Anoka, on the old main line east of Logansport, was completed March 15, 1868, making the old route via New Castle and Richmond into a branch. The CC&IC now had main lines from Columbus to Chicago and Indianapolis with branches from near Logansport, Indiana, southeast to Richmond, Indiana, (on the Indianapolis line) and west to Effner, Indiana. The Erie Railway offered in late 1868 to lease the CC&IC, but the Pittsburgh, Cincinnati and St. Louis Railway made a better offer on January 22, 1869, leasing it on February 1.

=== Expansion (1869–1890) ===
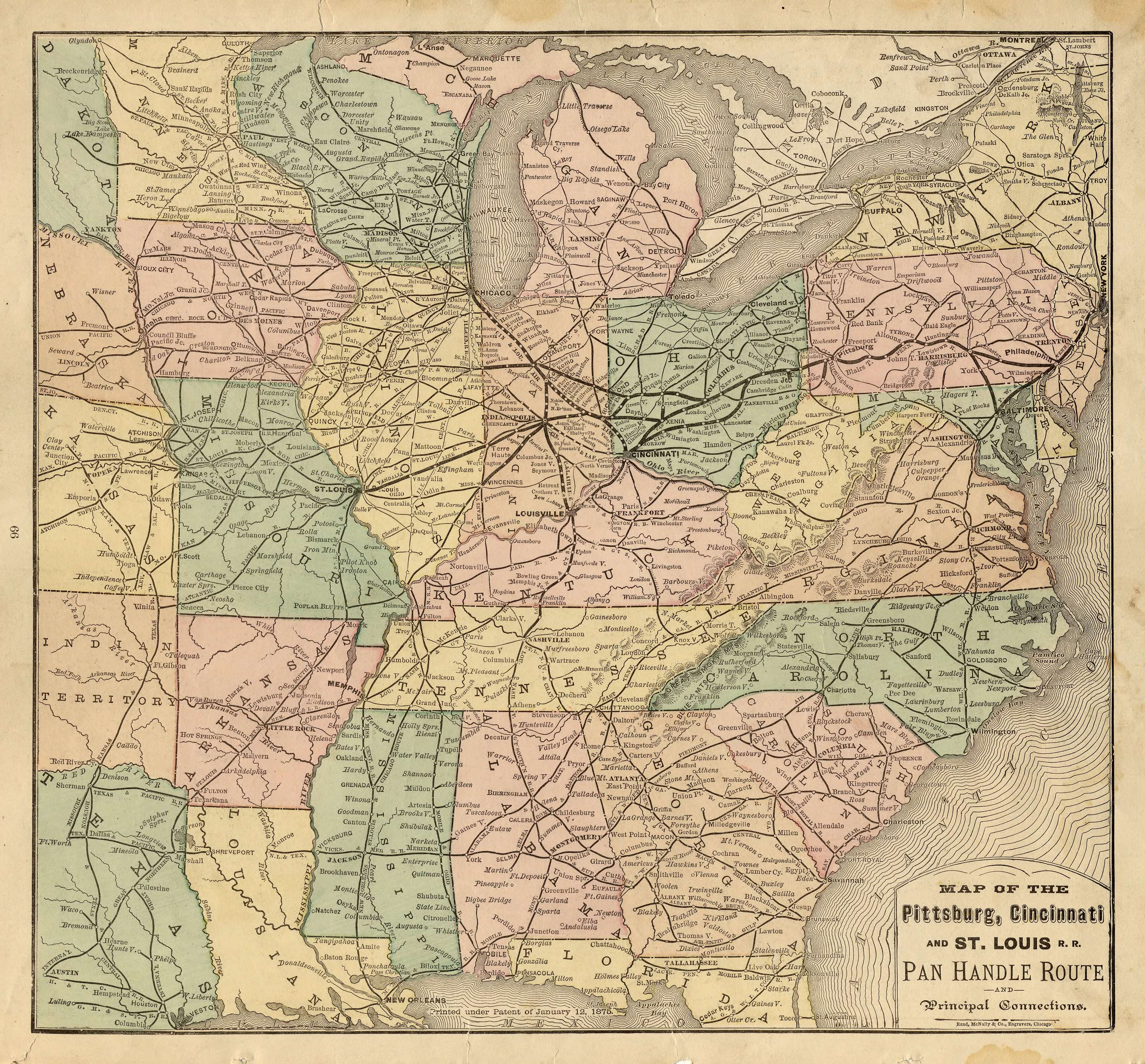
1877 map

On December 1, 1869 (retroactive from February 23, 1870) the Pittsburgh, Cincinnati and St. Louis Railway leased the Little Miami Railroad. This included the Columbus and Xenia Railroad, Dayton and Western Railroad and Dayton, Xenia and Belpre Railroad, as well as the Richmond and Miami Railway's branch west to Richmond, Indiana. With that lease, the Pennsylvania Railroad acquired access to Cincinnati.

With the 1870 completion of the St. Louis, Vandalia and Terre Haute Railroad and Terre Haute and Indianapolis Rail Road, the PRR now had a route to East St. Louis via the PC&StL to Indianapolis.

The Columbus, Chicago and Indiana Central Railway went bankrupt and was sold at foreclosure on January 10, 1883. The Chicago, St. Louis and Pittsburgh Railroad was incorporated in Indiana on March 14 and Illinois on March 15, and the former CC&IC was conveyed to the two companies on March 17. Operation by the PC&StL continued until April 1, 1883. On April 1, 1884, the two companies merged to form one Chicago, St. Louis and Pittsburgh Railroad. That company was merged with the PC&StL, Cincinnati and Richmond Railroad and Jeffersonville, Madison and Indianapolis Railroad on September 30, 1890, to form the Pittsburgh, Cincinnati, Chicago and St. Louis Railway (PCC&StL).

=== 20th century ===
In 1891, the PCC&StL acquired stock ownership of the Little Miami Railroad. On December 21, 1916 (taking effect January 1, 1917), the Pittsburgh, Cincinnati, Chicago and St. Louis Railway merged with the Vandalia Railroad, Pittsburgh, Wheeling and Kentucky Railroad, Anderson Belt Railway and Chicago, Indiana and Eastern Railway, forming the Pittsburgh, Cincinnati, Chicago and St. Louis Railroad.

The PCC&StL was leased by the PRR on January 1, 1921, and finally was merged into the PRR's Philadelphia, Baltimore and Washington Railroad on April 2, 1956.

=== Current use ===
Sections of the route have been adapted for other uses. The easternmost section, from the Pittsburgh Union Station through the Panhandle Tunnel and over the Panhandle Bridge to Station Square in Pittsburgh, is part of the Pittsburgh Light Rail system. From there to the Sheraden neighborhood of Pittsburgh, the railway forms part of Norfolk Southern's Mon Line. The portion from Sheraden to Carnegie, Pennsylvania, has been converted into the West Busway, a bus-only roadway. The section from Carnegie to Walkers Mill, Pennsylvania, retains its rails and is owned by the Pittsburgh and Ohio Central Railroad, however, it has not seen a train since mid 2015, and it will likely be removed to become part of the Panhandle Trail. The section from Walkers Mill to Weirton, West Virginia, was shut down and removed by Conrail in 1996, and has been made into the Panhandle Trail, a bicycling/walking trail. From the trail's end in Weirton to Columbus, the rails are still in place: from Weirton to Mingo Junction, the route is part of various rail lines and spurs, and from Mingo Junction to Columbus, the line forms part of the Columbus and Ohio River Railroad. Part of the line in Piqua, Ohio has been converted to a linear park. The line between Logansport and Chicago has been abandoned, with a portion of the right of way on the South Side of Chicago developed as the Major Taylor Trail, and a portion between Lansing, Illinois, and Schererville, Indiana, as the Pennsy Greenway.

== Branches ==
- Chartiers
- Dunkirk
- New Cumberland
- Wheeling, Indiana
- Muncie
- Effner
- Shelbyville
- Madison

== See also ==
- Main Line (Pittsburgh to St. Louis)
- Panhandle Bridge
- Panhandle Trail
- Pittsburgh & Steubenville Extension Railroad Tunnel
