= Clear Creek =

Clear Creek may refer to:

== Hydronyms ==
- Clear Creek (Alaska), a tributary of the Nenana River
- Clear Creek (Colorado), a tributary of the South Platte River and the cradle of the Colorado Gold Rush
- Clear Creek (Atlanta), a tributary of Peachtree Creek running through Atlanta, Georgia
- Clear Creek (Eel River), a stream in Indiana
- Clear Creek (Salt Creek), a tributary of Salt Creek running through Bloomington, Indiana
- Clear Creek (Kentucky), a tributary of the Cumberland River
- Clear Creek (Middle Fork John Day River), a tributary of Middle Fork John Day River, Oregon
- Clear Creek (Nevada), a tributary of the Carson River west of Carson City
- Clear Creek (Great Miami River), a tributary of the Great Miami River in southwestern Ohio
- Clear Creek (Hocking River), a tributary of the Hocking River in southeastern Ohio
- Clear Creek (Rocky River tributary), a stream in Cabarrus County, North Carolina
- Clear Creek (Pennsylvania), a tributary of the Clarion River in northwestern Pennsylvania
- Clear Creek (Harris County, Texas)
- Clear Creek (Tennessee), a tributary of the Obed River
- Clear Creek (Trinity River tributary), in Texas
- Clear Creek (Utah), a tributary of the Sevier River noted for its Fremont culture archaeological finds
- Clear Creek (Washington), a tributary of the Sauk River

=== In Arizona ===
- East Clear Creek in Coconino County, Arizona, tributary to Clear Creek (Little Colorado River tributary)
- Clear Creek (Little Colorado River tributary), in Coconino and Navajo Counties, Arizona
- Clear Creek Reservoir, on Clear Creek at Winslow, north-central Arizona, Painted Desert
- West Clear Creek, of the West Clear Creek Wilderness, central Arizona

=== In California ===
- Clear Creek (Sacramento River tributary)
- Clear Creek (San Benito River tributary)
- Clear Creek (San Mateo County), a tributary of San Gregorio Creek

=== In Iowa ===
- Clear Creek (Allamakee County, Iowa), a minor tributary of the Upper Mississippi River
- Clear Creek (Iowa River), a stream in Iowa
- Clear Creek (Squaw Creek tributary), a stream in Iowa

=== In Missouri ===
- Clear Creek (Big River), a stream in Missouri
- Clear Creek (Crooked Creek), a stream in Missouri
- Clear Creek (Daviess County, Missouri), a stream in Missouri
- Clear Creek (Fishing River), a stream in Missouri
- Clear Creek (Little Bonne Femme Creek), a stream in Missouri
- Clear Creek (Loutre River), a stream in Missouri
- Clear Creek (Mineral Fork), a stream in Missouri
- Clear Creek (Nodaway River tributary), a stream in Missouri
- Clear Creek (North River), a stream in Missouri
- Clear Creek (Osage River), a stream in southwest Missouri
- Clear Creek (Sac River), a stream in Missouri

== Toponyms ==
=== United States ===
- Clear Creek Trail, on the north rim of the Grand Canyon
- Clear Creek, Lassen County, California
- Clear Creek, Indiana, unincorporated place in Monroe County
- Clear Creek, Minnesota, unorganized territory in Carlton County
- Clear Creek, a firing range complex at Fort Cavazos, Texas
- League City, Texas, city formerly called "Clear Creek"
- Clear Creek, Texas, a.k.a. Hogtown, a former settlement in Hemphill County near Canadian, Texas
- Clear Creek, Utah, virtual ghost town in Carbon County
- Clear Creek, Virginia
- Clear Creek, Wisconsin, a town
- Clear Creek County, Colorado
- Clear Creek Township (disambiguation)

=== Canada ===
- Clear Creek, Ontario, an agricultural community in Norfolk County
- Clear Creek (Lake Erie), a watershed administered by the Long Point Region Conservation Authority, that drains into Lake Erie

== Nature Preserves ==
- Clear Creek Metro Park, a nature preserve in Rockbridge, Ohio

== Companies ==
- Clear Creek Distillery, a producer of eau de vie in Portland, Oregon, United States

== Monasteries ==
- Monastery of Our Lady of the Annunciation of Clear Creek, a Benedictine Monastery near Hulbert, Oklahoma, United States

== See also ==
- Clear Branch (disambiguation)
- Clear Fork (disambiguation)
- Clear River (disambiguation)
