= Chester Township, Wabash County, Indiana =

Chester Township
- Township
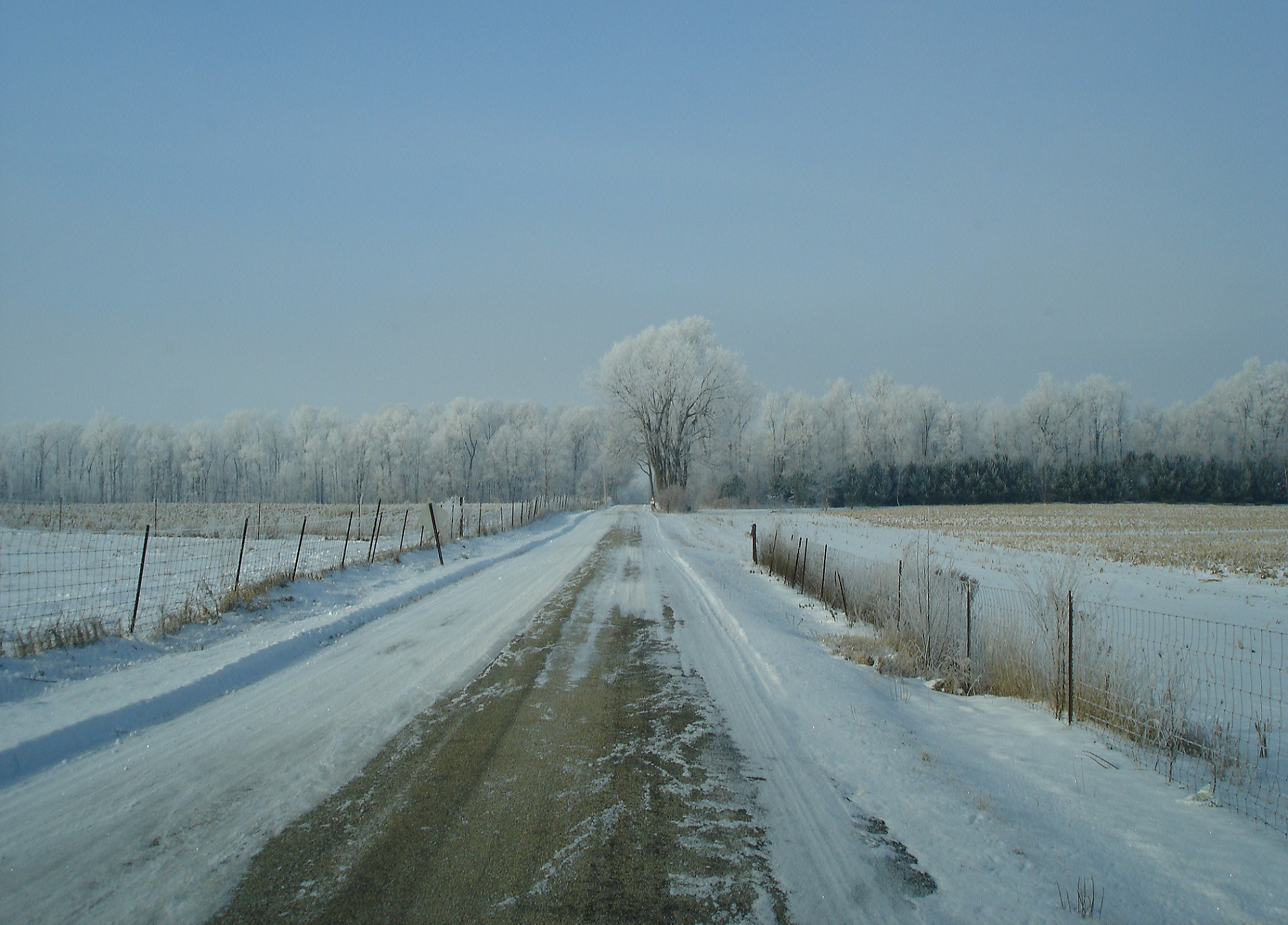
- Countryside near Liberty Mills

- Location in Wabash County
- Coordinates: 40°58′13″N 85°43′43″W
- Country: United States
- State: Indiana
- County: Wabash

Government
  - Type: Indiana township

Area
  - Total: 65.26 sq mi (169.0 km^{2})
  - Land: 65.03 sq mi (168.4 km^{2})
  - Water: 0.23 sq mi (0.60 km^{2}) 0.35%
- Elevation: 807 ft (246 m)

Population (2020)
  - Total: 7,001
  - Density: 107.7/sq mi (41.57/km^{2})
- ZIP codes: 46946, 46962, 46990
- GNIS feature ID: 453198

Chester Township is one of seven townships in Wabash County, Indiana, United States. As of the 2020 census, its population was 7,001 (down from 8,009 at 2010) and it contained 3,115 housing units.

The township's name most likely is a transfer from Chester, England.

== Geography ==
According to the 2010 census, the township has a total area of 65.26 square miles (169.0 km^{2}), of which 65.03 square miles (168.4 km^{2}) (or 99.65%) is land and 0.23 square miles (0.60 km^{2}) (or 0.35%) is water.

=== Cities, towns, villages ===
- North Manchester

=== Unincorporated towns ===
- Liberty Mills at 41.033656°N 85.735819°W
- Servia at 40.956711°N 85.740540°W

(This list is based on USGS data and may include former settlements.)

=== Adjacent townships ===
- Jackson Township, Kosciusko County (north)
- Cleveland Township, Whitley County (northeast)
- Warren Township, Huntington County (east)
- Lagro Township (south)
- Paw Paw Township (southwest)
- Pleasant Township (west)
- Lake Township, Kosciusko County (northwest)

=== Cemeteries ===
- Glenwood
- Krisher
- Oaklawn
- Swank
- Union

=== Airports and landing strips ===
- Servia Airport

=== Landmarks ===
- Manchester College
- Peabody Memorial Home
- North Manchester Covered Bridge

=== Bodies of water ===
- Eel River
  - Beargrass Creek
  - Clear Creek
  - Pony Creek
  - Simonton Creek
  - Swank Creek
  - Wheeler Creek

== School districts ==
- Manchester Community Schools

== Political districts ==
- Indiana's 5th congressional district
- State House District 22
- State Senate District 17
