= Pony Creek =

Pony Creek may refer to:

- Pony Creek (Indiana), a stream in Indiana
- Pony Creek (North Fork North Fabius River), a stream in Missouri
- Pony Creek Park, a park in Iowa
