= John Ewbank =

John Ewbank may refer to:

- John Ewbank (composer), British-born Dutch composer, lyricist and record producer
- John Ewbank (climber), Australian rock climber
- John Wilson Ewbank, English painter

== See also ==
- John Eubank, baseball pitcher
- John Eubanks (disambiguation)
