= Wheeler Creek =

Wheeler Creek may refer to:

- Wheeler Creek (Eel River), a stream in Indiana
- Wheeler Creek (Grindstone Creek), a stream in Missouri
- Wheeler Creek (Montana), a stream in Flathead County, Montana
