= List of Pennsylvania Railroad lines west of Pittsburgh =

The following railroad lines were owned or operated by the Pennsylvania Railroad west of Pittsburgh and Erie.

== Pittsburgh to Chicago ==
- Main Line (Pittsburgh to Chicago)
  - Economy Branch (Baden)
  - Block House Run Branch (New Brighton)
  - North Rochester Branch (Rochester)
  - Marginal Branch (Beaver Falls)
  - Oil Street Branch (Beaver Falls)
  - South Canton Branch (Canton)
  - Buck Hill Branch (Canton)
  - South Massillon Branch (Massillon)
  - Massillon and Cleveland Branch (Massillon Junction to Clinton)
  - Walhonding Branch (Loudonville to Coshocton)
  - Rocky Fork Branch (Mansfield)
  - Toledo Branch (Toledo Junction to Detroit)
    - Water Street Branch (Toledo)
    - River Branch (Toledo)
    - Oakman Branch (Dearborn)
    - West Belt Branch (Dearborn to Highland Park)
  - Grand Rapids Branch (Fort Wayne to Mackinaw City)
    - Muskegon Branch (Grand Rapids to Muskegon)
    - Missaukee Branch (Missakuee Junction to Michelson)
    - Traverse City Branch (Walton Junction to Traverse City)
    - Harbor Springs Branch (Kegomic to Harbor Springs)
  - State Line and Indiana City Railway (Clarke Junction to State Line)
    - Wolf Lake Branch (Hammond)
    - Hammond Branch (Hammond to Hegewisch)
  - South Chicago and Southern Railroad (Colehour to Bernice)
  - Calumet River Line (South Chicago to Hegewisch)
  - Cummings Branch (South Chicago)
  - Calumet Western Railway (South Chicago to Hegewisch)
- Cleveland Line (Rochester to Cleveland)
  - Beaver Valley Railroad Branch (Vanport)
  - River Branch (Yellow Creek to Bellaire)
    - Wheeling Terminal Branch (Martins Ferry to Benwood)
    - POV&C Railroad Branch (Bellaire to Krebs Run)
      - Wegee Branch (Wegee to Webb)
  - Salineville Railroad (Salineville)
  - Canton-Bayard Branch (Bayard to Fairhope)
  - Tuscarawas Branch (Bayard to Goshen)
    - Brush Run Branch (Magnolia)
    - Marietta Branch (Dover to Marietta)
    - Strasburg Branch (Dover to Parral)
  - Akron Branch (Hudson to Columbus)
    - Dresden Branch (Killbuck to Trinway)
    - Howard Branch (Howard to Millwood)
  - Maple Heights Industrial Branch (Maple Heights to Cleveland)
  - Kingsbury Branch (Cleveland)
  - Silver Plate Branch (Cleveland)
- New Brighton to Ashtabula Harbor
  - Kenwood Branch (New Brighton)
  - Beaver Valley Branch (Homewood Junction to Wampum Junction)
  - Mahoningtown Branch (New Castle Junction to New Castle)
    - Erie and Pittsburgh Branch (New Castle to Erie)
      - Sharpsville Branch (Sharpsville)
    - New Castle Branch (New Castle to Stoneboro)
      - Wilmington Branch (Wilmington Junction to New Wilmington)
      - Wolf Creek Branch (Leesburg to Redmond)
  - Bessemer Branch (Coverts to Walford)
  - Canfield Branch (Haselton)
  - Alliance Branch (Niles to Alliance)
- Sandusky Branch (Sandusky to Columbus)

== Pittsburgh to St. Louis ==
- Main Line (Pittsburgh, PA to St. Louis, MO)
  - Ohio Connecting Railway (Woods Run, Pittsburgh to Elliott, Pittsburgh)
    - Duffs Branch (Esplen, Pittsburgh to Thornburg)
    - Sheridan Branch (Esplen, Pittsburgh to Elliott, Pittsburgh)
  - Chartiers Branch (Carnegie to Washington)
    - Bridgeville and McDonald Branch (Bridgeville to Cecil)
    - Westland Branch (Houston to Westland)
      - Palanka Branch (Houston to Palanka)
  - Burgetts Branch (Burgettstown to Valear)
    - Hickory Branch (Burgettstown to Cherry Valley)
    - Langeloth Branch (Valear to Studa)
  - New Cumberland Branch (Weirton Junction to Kobuta)
  - Wheeling Branch (Weirton Junction to Benwood)
  - Cadiz Branch (Cadiz Junction to Cadiz)
    - Georgetown Branch (Lando to Georgetown)
  - Zanesville Branch (Trinway to Morrow)
    - Mill Run Branch (Zanesville)
  - Springfield Branch (Xenia to Springfield)
  - C&X Branch (Xenia, OH to Cincinnati, OH)
    - Middletown Branch (Middletown Junction, OH to Middletown, OH)
    - Undercliff Branch (Rendcomb Junction, OH to Cincinnati, OH)
    - Richmond Branch (Oakley, OH to Anoka, IN)
      - Fort Wayne Branch (Richmond, IN to Adams Township of Allen County, IN)
  - Lebanon Branch (Cincinnati, OH to Dayton, OH)
    - Montgomery Branch (Blue Ash, OH to Montgomery, OH)
    - Hempstead Branch (Hempstead to Clement)
  - Louisville Branch (Indianapolis, IN to Louisville, KY)
    - Madison Branch (Columbus, IN to Madison, IN)
    - Shelbyville Branch (Columbus, IN to Dublin Junction, IN)
    - New Albany Branch (Jeffersonville, IN to New Albany, IN)
    - Arbegust Street Branch (Louisville, KY)
  - Vincennes Branch (Indianapolis, IN to Vincennes, IN)
    - Starch Works Branch (Indianapolis, IN)
    - Greene County Coal Branch (Bushrod, IN to Linton, IN)
    - Columbia Branch (Bicknell, IN)
    - Knox County Coal Branch (Bicknell, IN)
  - Vandalia Railroad (Indianapolis, IN to St. Louis, MO)
    - St. Louis, Vandalia and Terre Haute Railroad (St. Louis, MO to Terre Haute, IN)
    - Terre Haute and Indianapolis Rail Road (Indianapolis, IN to Terre Haute, IN)
    - Terre Haute and Logansport Branch (Terre Haute, IN to Logansport, IN)
    - Logansport and Toledo Branch (Logansport, IN to Toledo, OH)
  - I&F Branch
  - Centerpoint Branch (Stearleys to Centerpoint)
  - Hadleytown Branch (Brazil to Hadleytown)
  - Saline City Branch (Brazil)
  - Willow Creek Branch (Staunton to Seelyville)
  - Furnace Branch (Brazil)
  - Glen Ayr Branch (Seelyville)
  - Crawfordsville Branch (Terre Haute to Frankfort)
  - Macksville North Branch (West Terre Haute)
  - Macksville South Branch (West Terre Haute)
  - Peoria Branch (Farrington to Peoria)
  - Highland Mill Branch (Highland)
  - Troy Branch (Collinsville to Troy)
  - Stock Yards Branch (East St. Louis, IL)

== Columbus to Chicago ==
- Main Line (Columbus, OH to Chicago, IL)
  - Main Line (Columbus to Indianapolis via Bradford) (Bradford, OH to New Paris, OH)
  - Muncie Branch (Converse, IN to Muncie, IN)
  - South Bend Branch (Logansport, IN to South Bend, IN)
    - Butler Branch (Logansport, IN to Butler, IN)
  - Effner Branch (Kenneth, IN to Effner, IL)
  - Englewood Connecting Railway Branch (Chicago, IL)

== See also ==
- List of Pennsylvania Railroad lines east of Pittsburgh
