= Butler Branch (Indiana) =

Historic railroad line in Indiana, US

Coordinates: 40°45′42.5″N 86°21′8.9″W

- Eel River Railroad
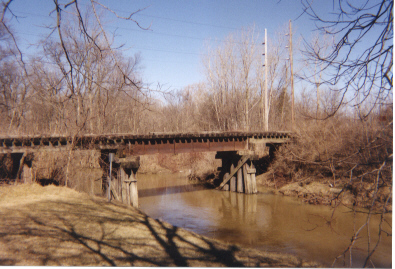
- Bridge on the Butler Branch line over Cedar Creek in Auburn, February 2001

Overview
- Franchises: Terre Haute & Indianapolis; Vandalia Railroad; Pittsburgh, Cincinnati, Chicago & St. Louis
- Main region: Northeastern Indiana
- Parent company: Pennsylvania Railroad
- Dates of operation: 1877–1977
- Predecessor: Detroit, Eel River and Illinois Railroad
Route map
Map

The Butler Branch was a historic railroad line that operated in Indiana, US. It ran between the city of Logansport on the Wabash River in north central Indiana and the namesake town of Butler near the Ohio border in northeastern Indiana.

This line was better known as the Eel River Railroad (late 19th century), since it roughly followed that northern Indiana waterway between Logansport and Columbia City; thus it was also known as the "Eel River Route" or "Eel River Line" under subsequent leaseholders and owners. In 1901, it was acquired by the Pennsylvania Railroad (PRR), and it was operated by various wholly owned subsidiaries of that company as follows: Terre Haute & Indianapolis (TH&I) from 1901 to 1904, Vandalia Railroad from 1905 to 1916, and Pittsburgh, Cincinnati, Chicago & St. Louis (PCC&StL) beginning in 1917. During this era, the line obtained the "Butler Branch" designation. From that northeast Indiana town, trackage rights allowed PRR trains to continue over the Wabash Railroad to Toledo, Ohio.

In Logansport, the line began at a junction with the PRR's South Bend Branch, with access to its Effner Branch and I&F (Indianapolis & Frankfort) Branch tracks. The line crossed the PRR's Chicago to Pittsburgh Main Line at Columbia City and the Grand Rapids Branch at LaOtto.

Between Columbia City and a point due south of Garrett (or just northwest of Cedar), the alignment of Indiana State Route 205 was built to closely parallel a very straight section of the (now former) tracks of the Eel River Railroad (also known as the Butler Branch line).

== History ==
=== Early history ===
The first attempt to construct a railroad along the Eel River was by the Toledo, Logansport and Northern Rail Road in 1856; however this company was unsuccessful. In 1872 the section between Denver and Auburn was opened, On October 18, 1873, the section between Auburn and Butler was completed. The entire line opened in 1874, completed by the Detroit, Eel River and Illinois Railroad. The company was reorganized in 1877 as the Eel River Railroad.

=== Wabash Railroad controversy ===
Struggling financially, on August 26, 1879, the Wabash, St. Louis and Pacific Railway signed a 99-year lease agreement with the railroad. This lease worked out profitably for the Wabash, giving it a direct line from Detroit to its main line at Logansport, and they used the line as a key connecting link between St. Louis, Missouri, and the East Coast. Problems occurred by 1890 with the lease agreement when the Wabash leased the 9.63-mile (15.50 km) Peru and Detroit Railway running between Peru and Chili to ease movements with a connecting line from Chili to Peru, abandoning the line between Chili and Logansport. Bondholders residing in the Logansport area, in outage, began a ten-year legal battle.

A court ruled that the Eel River Railroad's charter was forfeited by its lease to a competing company (the Wabash), leading to the bondholders regaining control of the railroad. The Wabash continued to use the line on an interim lease until 1902, when the Wabash completed a 25.6-mile (41.2 km) line between New Haven and Butler.

=== Vandalia Railroad era ===
With local shareholders back in control, the line was reorganized as the Logansport and Toledo Railway (L&T) and bought by the Pennsylvania Railroad in 1901, when operations were transferred to the PRR's Terre Haute and Indianapolis Railroad. This gave the PRR a route between St. Louis and Toledo, via a connection with the Lake Shore and Michigan Southern Railway at Butler. In 1905, the L&T was merged with other lines (including the TH&I) to form the Vandalia Railroad, a new operating subsidiary of the PRR.

The Vandalia gained trackage rights over the Wabash from Butler into Toledo's Union Station on June 1, 1913, allowing for through freight and passenger service from Toledo to St. Louis and Chicago. The Vandalia was merged into the Pittsburgh, Cincinnati, Chicago and St. Louis Railroad on January 1, 1917, and the Pennsylvania Railroad began operating the branch directly on January 1, 1921, with a lease of the PCC&StL.

=== Abandonment ===
As the Vandalia line, the track gave purely local services, and business declined as did the quality of the rail line. With an embargo placed on the line between Auburn and Butler due to poor conditions, abandonment of the line began in 1954 with complete abandonment by 1977.

== Cities and towns along the Butler Branch Railroad ==
All cities and towns in Indiana

- Logansport
- Van
- Adamsboro
- Hoover
- Mexico
- Denver
- Chili
- Pettsville
- Roann
- Laketon
- North Manchester. Schwalm Hall of Manchester University was built in 1961 when the railroad was still in operation, and was known for being on "the other side of the tracks."
- Liberty Mills
- Collamer (Note: While the railroad ran through Collamer, it was not listed as a town in Sulzer.)
- South Whitley
- Wynkoop
- Vandale
- Columbia City
- Collins
- Churubusco
- Ari
- LaOtto
- Cedar
- Auburn
- Moore
- Butler

== Recent developments ==
Since being completely abandoned in 1977, the ground which laid the railroad has been left mostly untouched, leaving behind a ghostly touch of the past. Most of the larger bridges have been removed, but many of the smaller wooden bridges covering creeks remain. In Logansport, the path of the line has been turned into a 1.3-mile (2.1 km) asphalt surface trail, called the River Bluff Trail, and a similar effort is in the works between South Whitley and Columbia City, called the Eel River Trail.

In March 2019, Trains Magazine reported that the Logansport & Eel River Railroad was seeking a waiver for a requirement to put a section of out-of-service track back into service. The Federal Railroad Administration filing says the railroad, which currently exists in name only, is seeking the relief as part of a purchase proceeding with the Indiana Transportation Museum, which has already made a down payment on 1.6 miles of track. According to the filing, the Logansport & Eel River Railroad is seeking relief from federal requirements regarding signage and notices at six grade crossings on the line and notices that the rail line in question is once again back in service. The railroad is also seeking an answer regarding whom — the Logansport & Eel River or connecting railroad Toledo, Peoria & Western, a Genesee & Wyoming company — is responsible for replacing a switch which used to connect the short line to the TP&W. Logansport & Eel River is arguing that the switch was removed without permission and TP&W wants $86,500 for a new switch. In the filing, Logansport & Eel River states the railroad is ready to re-install signage once a decision is made about the responsibility for the switch.
