= Beargrass Creek =

Beargrass Creek may refer to:

- Beargrass Creek (Indiana), United States
- Beargrass Creek (Kentucky), United States
