= Liberty Mills, Indiana =

- Unincorporated community and Census-designated place
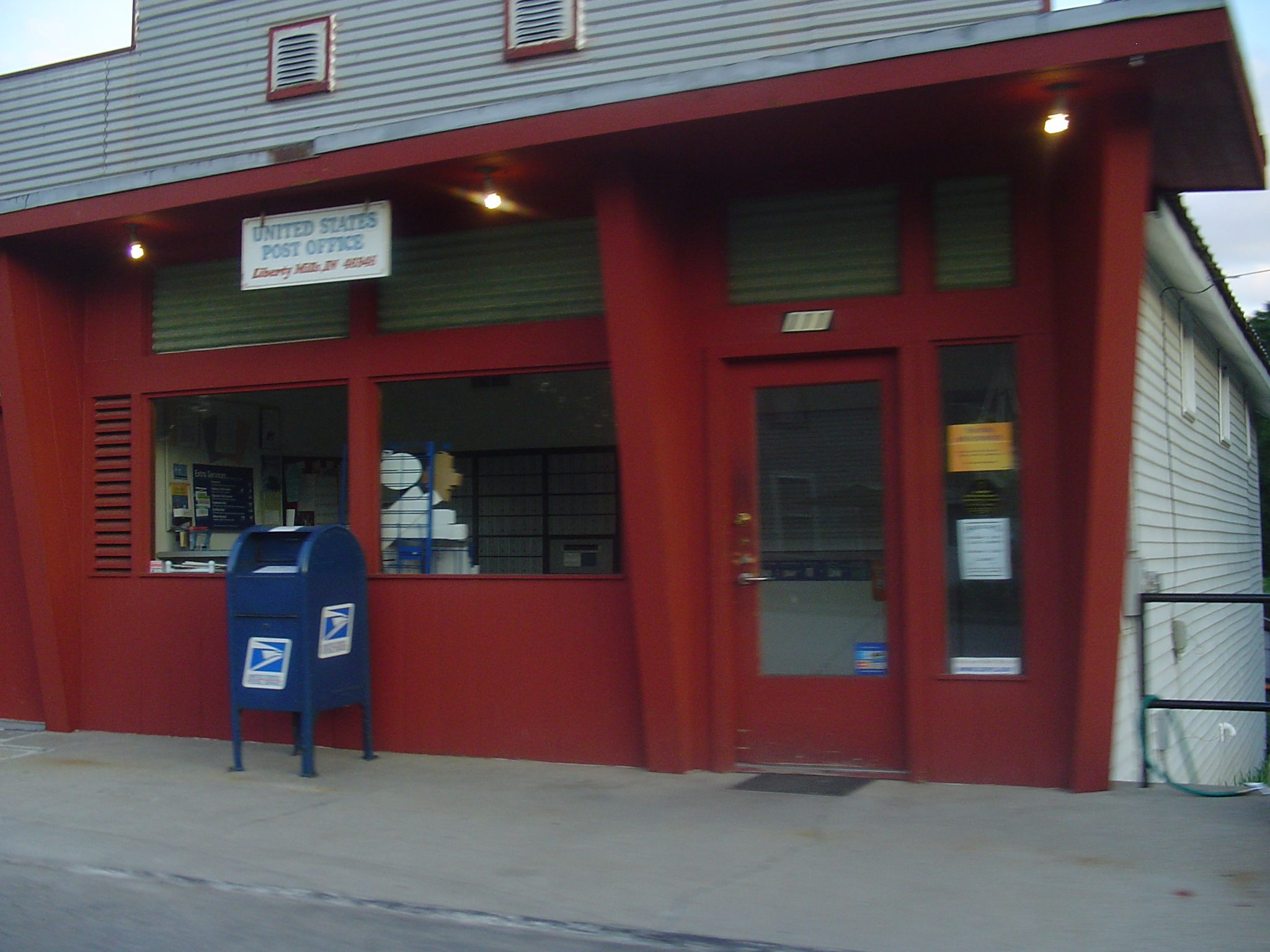
- Post Office, Downtown Liberty Mills

- Location within Indiana Location within the United States
- Coordinates: 41°02′21″N 85°44′22″W
- Country: United States
- State: Indiana
- County: Wabash
- Township: Chester
- Platted: September 5, 1837
- Elevation: 781 ft (238 m)

Population (2010)
  - Total: 136
- Time zone: UTC-5 (Eastern (EST))
  - Summer (DST): UTC-4 (EDT)
- ZIP code: 46946
- FIPS code: 18-43596
- GNIS feature ID: 2830570

Liberty Mills is an unincorporated community on the Eel River in Chester Township, Wabash County, in the U.S. state of Indiana. Proprietor John Comstock (1802–1879) platted the town June 24, 1837. The name Liberty Mills comes from the number of mills the town once operated, including a saw mill, a carding mill, and a distillery, with one of the mills coming from the ‘Liberty’ brand. Its ZIP code is 46946.

== Demographics ==
The United States Census Bureau first delineated Liberty Mills as a census designated place in the 2022 American Community Survey.

As of the census of 2010 for Zip Code Tabulation Area 46946, there were 136 people, 47 households, and 37 families residing in the town. The racial makeup of the town was 94.9% White, 0.7% African American, 0.7% Native American, 0% Asian, 0% Pacific Islander, 0.7% from other races, and 0% from two or more races. Hispanic or Latino of any race were 2.9% of the population.

There were 47 households, out of which 31.9% had children under the age of 18 living with them, 66% were married couples living together, 8.5% had a female householder with no husband present, and 21.3% were non-families. 42.6% had households with individuals under 18 years, and 29.8% had households with individuals 65 years of age or older. The average household size was 2.89 and the average family size was 3.35.

In the town the population was spread out, with 31% under the age of 19, 5.1% from 20 to 24, 27.1% from 25 to 44, 22.1% from 45 to 64, and 14.7% who were 65 years of age or older. The median age was 32.7 years.

== History ==
On October 16, 1826, and October 23, 1826, in what is now Wabash, Indiana, the Potawatomi and Miami Indians respectively signed peace treaties with the United States government to open lands north of the Wabash River to white settlers. These negotiations, led by Michigan Governor Lewis Cass, resulted in the Paradise Springs Peace Treaty. The Potowatomi before that point were located on the Eel River, which they called the Kenapocomoco (KE-NA-PE-COM-A-QUA), in a series of villages named Pierrish's Village, located at present day North Manchester, three miles south of Liberty Mills.

The land that is now Liberty Mills was purchased by James Abbott, who was involved with the treaty negotiations, sold to a Mr. McBride who intended to build a grist mill, and eventually purchased by New York state resident John Comstock. Comstock moved to the area in 1836, where he first built a saw mill, and later a grist mill, a distillery, store, carding mill, and flouring mill.

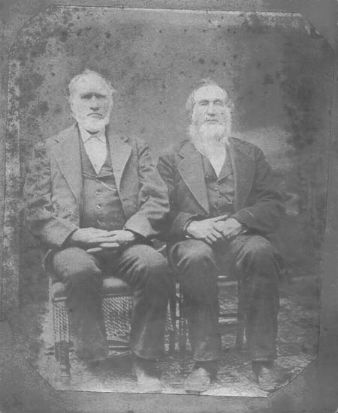
John Comstock, on left

"John Comstock in his day was easily the biggest and most influential business man and farmer in Northern Wabash county. He was a member of the State Legislature and a probate judge and was progressive in many ways and as stubborn as an ox in others. When the canal was built through Lagro he maintained a warehouse at Lagro and attracted business men to Liberty Mills faster than to North Manchester. However, he could not stand competition, and because of his buying power, could undersell those who dared compete with him. Some of the early business men came to North Manchester. In fact, it was not uncommon in telling the history of an early North Manchester business man to mention that he first located in Liberty Mills."

Comstock, often known as Judge Comstock because of his role as Probate Judge (elected in 1846), was also the Representative from this county in the Indiana State Legislature in 1858. His distillery, built in 1839, would send wagon loads of whiskey to areas as far as Mishawaka and Warsaw, Indiana. It brought distress to first his sons, who for religious convictions left the business, and later Comstock himself, who declared "I will let that distillery rot!" even after offers to purchase it.

Due to Comstock's monopolizing business practices, most local business men left to establish themselves in neighboring North Manchester. In time North Manchester flourished (The population was 6,260 at the 2000 census) while Liberty Mills remained unchanged in size. Comstock was instrumental however in bringing the Detroit, Eel River & Illinois Railroad through the community in 1871, which stretched from Logansport to Butler, Indiana. After a lengthy legal battle with the Wabash Railroad, this railline was sold to the Pennsylvania Railroad in 1901, and eventually came into the Pennsylvania's Vandalia holdings. Then known as the Vandalia Railroad and Butler Branch Railroad, the railroad's use declined over the years until its abandonment from 1954 to 1977.

=== Covered bridge ===
Because of its location on a curvy tack of the Eel River, Liberty Mills has been home to numerous bridges, three standing today. At the location of the iron bridge today (on the north end of town on First Street) was home to the Covered Bridge. Three different covered bridges were built on this location from 1859 to the third being lost in 1953. The first was built in 1859 and lost in 1867. The second from 1867 to 1872, with a length of 192 feet with a 10-foot overhang at each end. The third, and most known, was built in 1872 by the Smith Bridge Company and lost in 1953. This covered bridge was listed in the Time magazine article "One-Day Railroaders" on October 19, 1936, the town's first and only note of national attention.

=== Dam ===
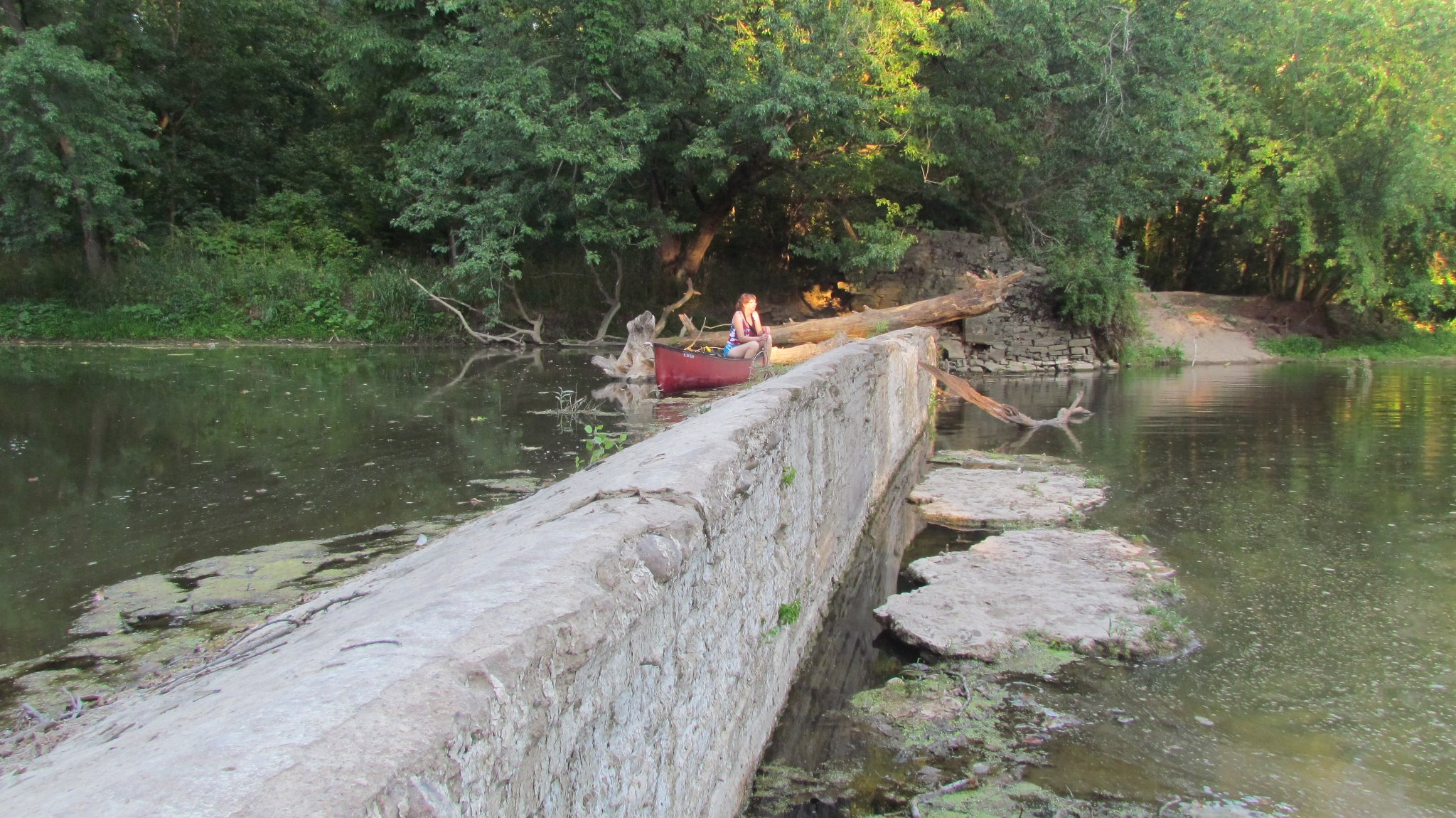
Crib Dam on the Eel River

Liberty Mills was home to a crib dam on the Eel River, located directly south of the existing iron bridge on 1st Street. It was originally built in the nineteenth century to power one of the many mills. By the early twentieth-first century it had been out of operation for numerous years and damaged on the far north end. With a $120,000 grant from the Ohio River Basin Fish Habitat Partnership program and the U.S. Fish & Wildlife Service the dam was destroyed October 11–12, 2012. The dam was destroyed to improve fish passages and raise the long-term health of the Wabash River watershed.

=== School house ===
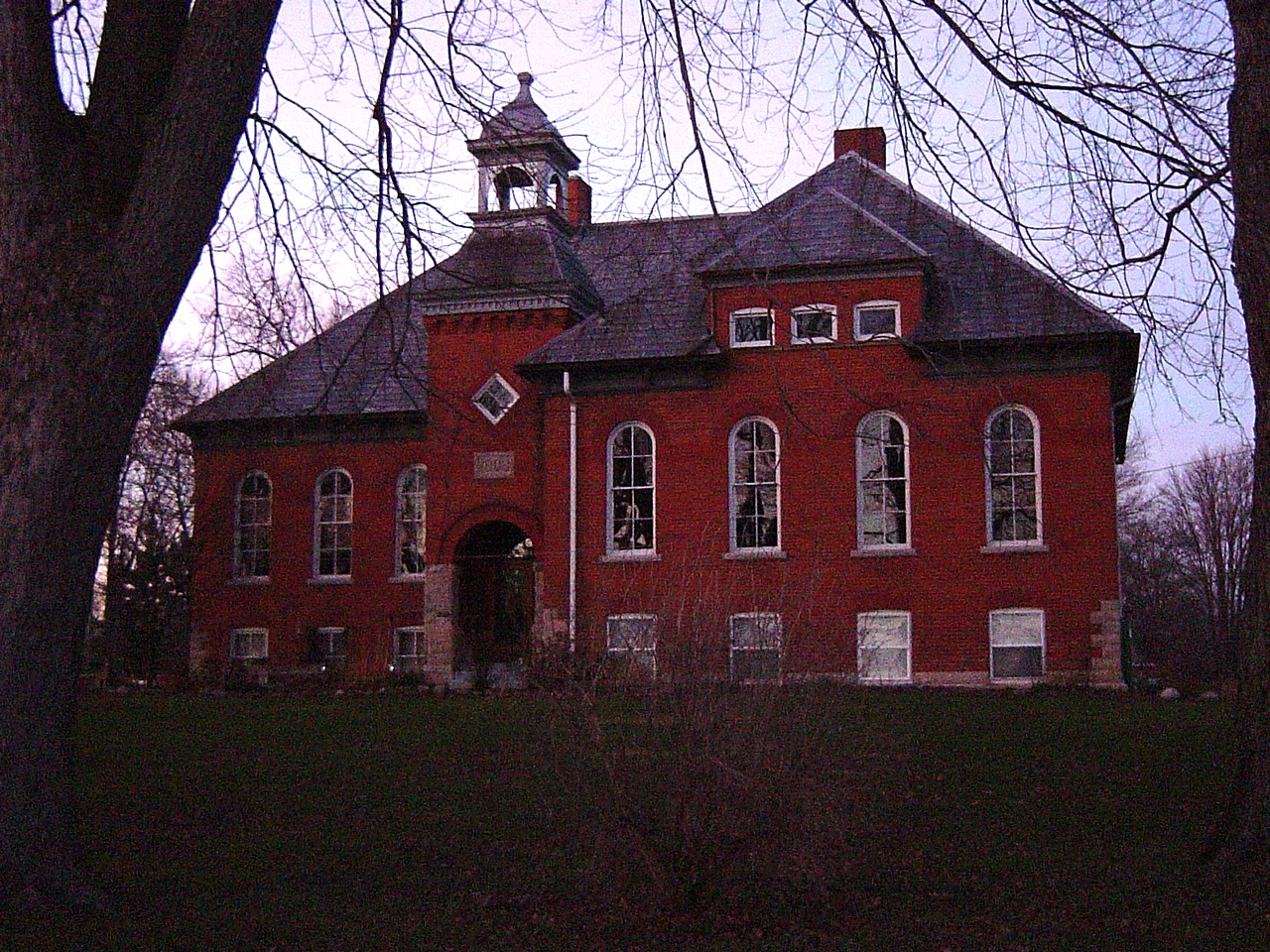
Liberty Mills' School House

Liberty Mill's largest structure is the school house, built in 1903. Children were first taught in a log cabin by Harriet Tullis. In 1841, a school building was constructed, lasting until 1872. In 1872, on the northeast corner of Mill and Fourth Street, a two-story building was built to serve as a school and town hall. This building was dismantled in 1903 with a new building being built on the 1872 foundation. The school stopped operating at the end of the 1958–59 school year. In 1989 it was refurbished by then owner Jim Mazerik. Hhe then rented it out until 2024 when it was then purchased by the Isenberg family. It now currently being refurbished inside and outside. On January 17, 2026, a major fire occurred leaving the structure severely damaged.

== Nature preserves ==
Although of small size, Liberty Mills is home to several nature preserves controlled by the Tippecanoe Audubon Society, the local chapter of the national Audubon Society, an Izaak Walton League club ground, and a public access site.

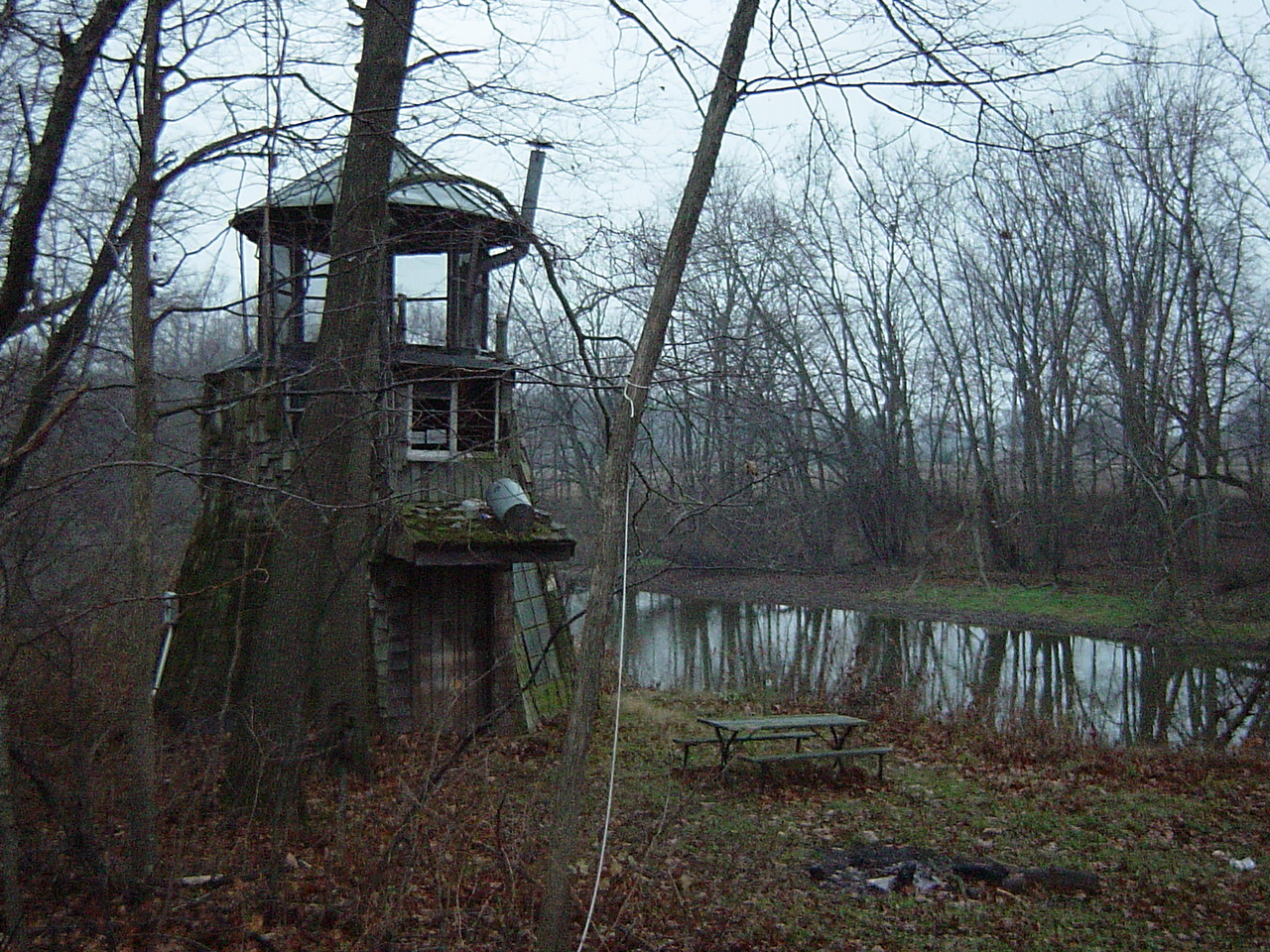
The "Tee-Pee"

=== Taylor Preserve ===
The Herbert L. Taylor Audubon Preserve is located on the northeast edge of town, stretching along the east side of the Eel River. The Taylor family owned this piece of land for over five generations, from George W. and Elizabeth Taylor in 1903 to Herbert "Herb" Taylor's donation of the remaining property in 1990. Taylor built a unique structure known as the "Tee Pee", a three-story house in the shape of an Indian teepee which overlooked the Eel River. Due to increased vandalism, the Tee Pee was destroyed on November 15, 2003.

=== Flory-Gemmer Marsh and Woods Preserve ===
The Flory-Gemmer Marsh Preserve and Woods Preserve are two smaller preserves one mile east of Liberty Mills. They were donated to the Tippecanoe Audubon Society in the mid-1990s.

=== Izaak Walton League Club Grounds ===
The North Manchester, Indiana chapter of the Izaak Walton League's club grounds are located north of Liberty Mills. These grounds have fishing and shooting sports, including frequent turkey shoot tournaments.

=== Public access site ===
On the south end of town is a public access site onto the Eel River. The stretch of the Eel River running by Liberty Mills is known for its canoeing and listed in several canoeing recreational guides. A legend also follows the access site of a particular fatal car wreck which ejected several girls from a vehicle, whose screams can be supposedly still heard today.

== Notable person ==
- Cliff Kindy – organic farmer and a member of the Christian Peacemaker Teams. Kindy owns a farm one mile east of Liberty Mills, has traveled the world with CPT including Iraq, where he is noted in the May 17, 2004, issue of New Yorker Magazine.

== Bibliography ==
History

- LaFlash, Matt. "(Photograph of) John Comstock 1802-1879". The USGenWeb Project.
- Leiter, Carl. "Indian Treaty of 1826 - Treaty Negotiations". Kokomo-Howard County Public Library :: Genealogy & Local History Services.
- "The Honorable John Comstock". Newsletter of the North Manchester Historical Society, Inc. 22 (2). May 2005.
- "Liberty Mills Centennial". Newsletter of the North Manchester Historical Society, Inc.: 9–11. May 2002.
- Helm, Thomas B. (1884). "Chester Township". In L.H. Newton (ed.). History of Wabash County, Indiana: Containing a History of the County, its Townships, Towns, Military Record, Portraits of Early Settlers and Prominent Men, Personal Reminiscences, etc. Chicago: John Morris, printer.
- "Wabash County History: Chester Township". Newsletter of the North Manchester Historical Society, Inc. 11 (3). August 1994.

Covered Bridge

- Gould, George Edwin (1967). The Covered Bridges of Indiana. [Indianapolis, Ind.]: Indiana Covered Bridge Society.
- Gould, George Edwin (1977). Indiana Covered Bridges thru the Years. Indianapolis: Indiana Covered Bridge Society.
- "Liberty Mills Covered Bridge, Wabash County, Indiana".
- Ketcham, Bryan E (1949). Covered Bridges on the Byways of Indiana. Lockland? Ohio.
- "Liberty Mills Bridge, Wabash County, Indiana (1)" (Institutional Repository). Ball State University Libraries: Digital Media Repository. April 2005.
- "Liberty Mills Bridge, Wabash County, Indiana (2)" (Institutional Repository). Ball State University Libraries: Digital Media Repository. April 2005.
- "Transport: One-Day Railroaders". Time Magazine. October 19, 1936. ISSN 0040-781X. Archived from the original on December 15, 2008.

Nature Preserves

- Taylor, Jay A. (November 1998). "A Productive and Well-Loved Woodland: A History of the Herbert L. Taylor Audubon Preserve during the five generations of the Taylor Family". Newsletter of the North Manchester Historical Society, Inc. 15 (4): 4–9.

Notable Residents

- Hersh, Seymour M. (May 17, 2004). "Chain of Command: How the Department of Defense mishandled the disaster at Abu Ghraib". The New Yorker. ISSN 0028-792X.
