= Blue Ridge Reservoir =

Waterbody in Coconino County, Arizona

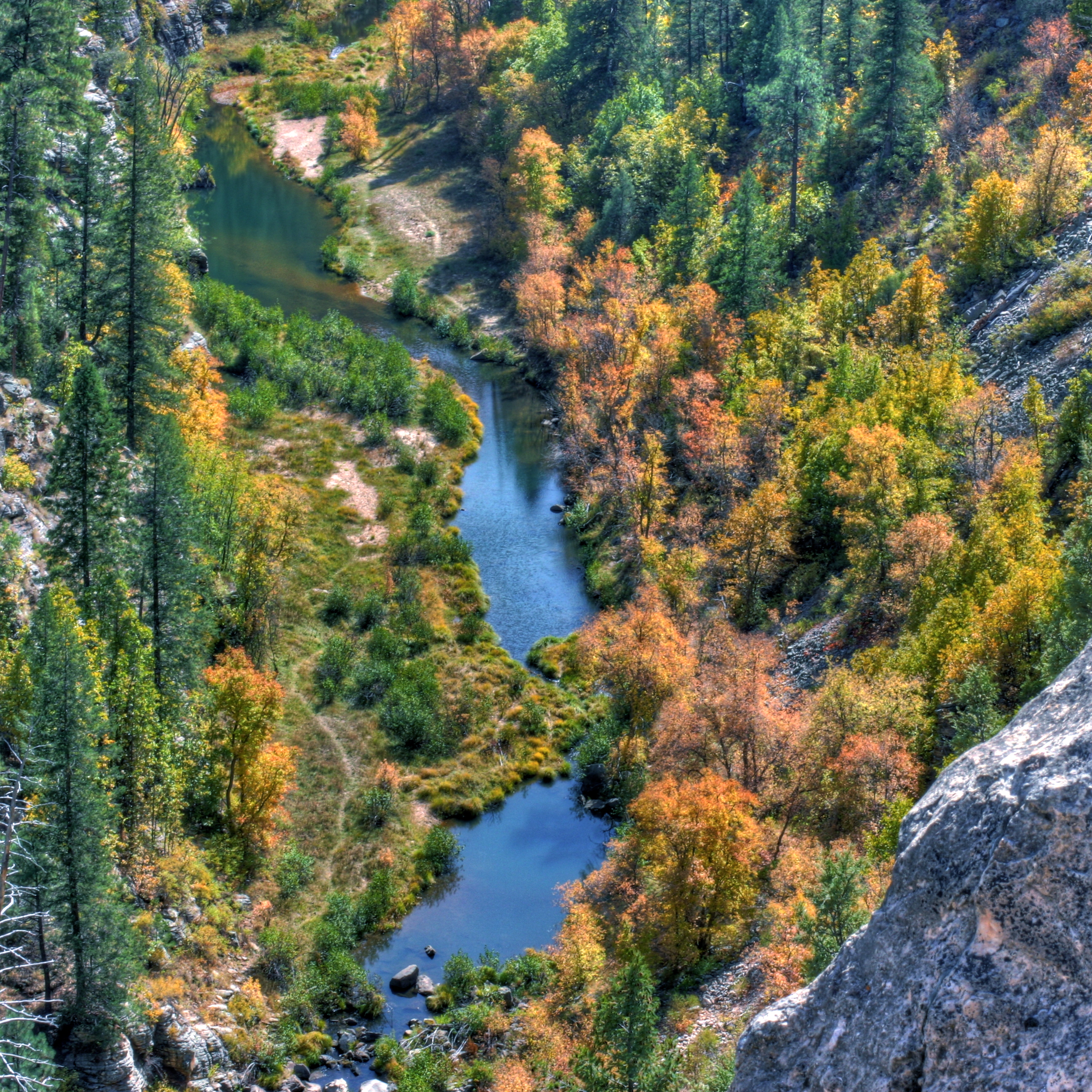

- Location within Arizona
- Location: Coconino County, Arizona, United States
- Coordinates: 34°33′16.3″N 111°11′50.7″W
- Type: reservoir
- Basin countries: United States
- Surface area: 70 acres (28 ha)
- Average depth: 147 ft (45 m)( without drought)
- Surface elevation: 6,720 ft (2,050 m)

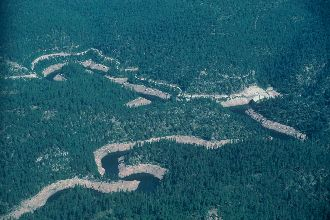
Aerial view of Blue Ridge Reservoir

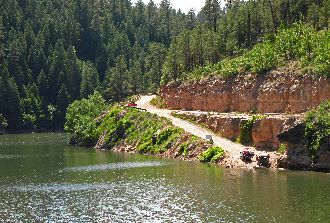
Boat launch area at Blue Ridge Reservoir

Blue Ridge Reservoir is located in the Mogollon Rim area of the state of Arizona. The dam that creates the reservoir impounds East Clear Creek. Clints Well, Arizona. Blue Ridge Reservoir is one of the more scenic reservoirs in the area, with trees going down to the water line. The facilities are maintained by Coconino National Forest division of the USDA Forest Service.

== Fish species ==
- Rainbow Trout
- Brown Trout
- Green Sunfish
