= Clear Branch =

Clear Branch may refer to:

- Clear Branch (Missouri River), a stream in Warren County, Missouri, United States
- Clear Branch (Platte River), a stream in Platte County, Missouri, United States
