= John Eubanks (disambiguation) =

John Eubanks is an American and Canadian football player.

John Eubanks may also refer to:

- John Hugh Eubanks, known as J. J. Eubanks, professional basketball player

== See also ==
- John Eubank, baseball pitcher
