= Clear Fork =

Clear Fork is the name of various locations in the United States:

- Clear Fork (Big South Fork Cumberland River) in Tennessee
- Clear Fork (Cumberland River) in Kentucky and Tennessee
- Clear Fork (Guyandotte River), a tributary of the Guyandotte River, in West Virginia
- Clear Fork, Virginia, an unincorporated community
- Clear Fork, West Virginia, a town
- Clear Fork (Oregon), a stream in the U.S. state of Oregon
- Clear Fork Mohican River in Ohio
- Clear Fork Brazos River in Texas
