= Pony Creek (North Fork North Fabius River tributary) =

Stream in the American state of Missouri

Coordinates: 40.4866997°N 92.2224051°W

Pony Creek is a stream in Scotland County in the U.S. state of Missouri. It is a tributary of the North Fork North Fabius River.

Pony Creek most likely was named for the fact local Indians owned ponies.

== See also ==
- List of rivers of Missouri
