= John Eubank =

American baseball player (1872–1958)

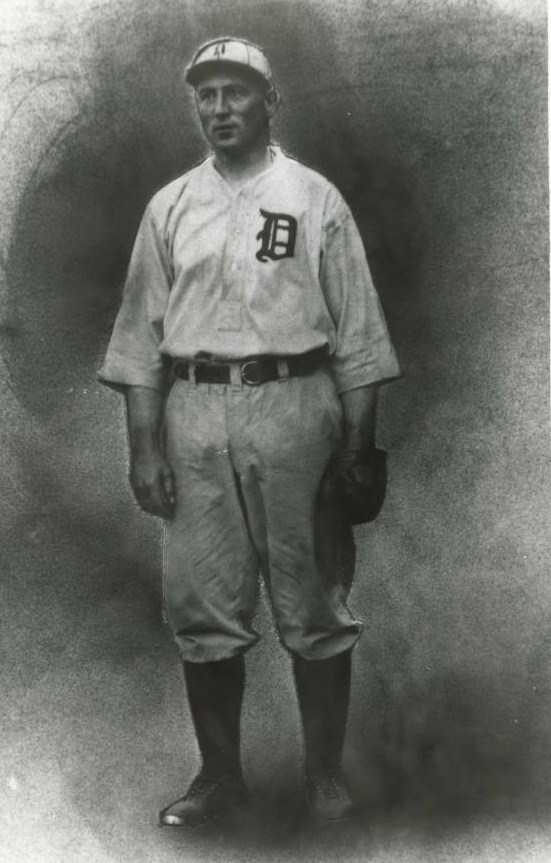
- Pitcher
- Born: September 9, 1872; Servia, Indiana, U.S.
- Died: November 3, 1958 (aged 86); Bellevue, Michigan, U.S.
- Batted: Right Threw: Right

MLB debut
- September 19, 1905, for the Detroit Tigers

Last MLB appearance
- August 2, 1907, for the Detroit Tigers

MLB statistics
- Win–loss record: 8–13
- Earned run average: 3.12
- Strikeouts: 56
- Stats at Baseball Reference

Teams
- Detroit Tigers (1905–1907)

John Franklin Eubank (September 9, 1872 – November 3, 1958), nicknamed "Honest John," was an American right-handed pitcher in Major League Baseball who played for the Detroit Tigers from 1905 to 1907.

== Early years ==
Eubank was born in Servia, Indiana, in 1872.

== Baseball player ==
=== Detroit Tigers ===
Eubank was purchased by the Detroit Tigers from Fort Dodge Gypsum Eaters of the Iowa State League in early August 1905. Eubank made his major league debut with the Tigers as a 33-year-old rookie on September 19, 1905. On September 22, 1905, he allowed only one hit and no runs in six innings as a relief pitcher against Washington. Eubank compiled a record of 1–0 with a 2.08 ERA in 1905.

He pitched in a career-high 24 games and 135 innings in 1906, compiling a 4–10 record with a 3.53 ERA. At the end of September, he pitched a complete-game shutout against New York.

In 1907, Eubank went 3–3 with a 2.67 ERA on a Detroit team that won the American League pennant. He lost his first start of the 1907 by a 1–0 score. In late June, Eubank pitched a shutout against the Cleveland Naps to stop a four-game losing streak. He pitched his last major league game on August 2, 1907.

Eubank was sent to Indianapolis late in the 1907 season where he had three wins in three starts. He returned to the Tigers for the 1907 World Series against the Chicago Cubs. Although he did not pitch in the World Series, Eubank protested when he was denied a share of the club's bonus funds. The team voted to exclude him in spite of his protest.

=== Minor leagues ===
Eubank continued to play in the minor leagues for several years, concluding his career with the Grays from Goshen, Indiana.

== Later years ==
At the time of the 1910 U.S. Census, Eubank was living in Bellevue, Michigan, with his wife, Bessie, and their children, Jennie (age 18), David (age 13), and Dewey (age 11).

At the time of the 1920 and 1930 U.S. Censuses, Eubank remained in Bellevue with his wife Bessie.

At the time of the 1940 U.S. Census, Eubank was living in Bellevue with his son, Ralph.

In November 1958, after a long illness, Eubank died at his home in Bellevue, Michigan.
