= Clear Creek, Ontario =

Community of Norfolk County, Ontario, Canada

Coordinates: 42.63326°N 80.61284°W

Clear Creek is a hamlet in southwestern Norfolk County, Ontario, Canada.

Clear Creek's earliest known inhabitants, from around the year 1000 until approximately 300–350 years later, were the Algonquin nation. They were noted flint-workers and evidence of their skill in crafting arrowheads is still to be found in open worked field areas surrounding the village. The next wave of inhabitants were the Attawandaron nation, the Neutrals, who occupied the region from about 1350 until their destruction by the Iroquois in the year 1651. The last significant native nation to occupy the area was the Mississaugas.

== Summary ==
In 2001, Haldimand-Norfolk was dissolved into two separate single-tier counties. Clear Creek became part of the newly formed County of Norfolk. Until November 2008, Clear Creek was an undisturbed rural community with little interference from the Government of Ontario.

There are no sidewalks for safe pedestrian walking and wind turbines are seen very frequently within the vicinity of Clear Creek; being installed in November 2008. Wind turbine construction activity was at its highest around the year 2008, after which it tapered off.

Approximately 240 people live in this town among the 130 houses. People have lived in this community as far back as 1901 with some Canadian soldiers from the First World War having been raised in this community.

Norfolk County has banned the placement of new wind turbines after becoming a "willing host" for them back in 2003. One of the council members were worried about Norfolk County becoming "industrialized" and "unnatural." Many leaders in Norfolk County envision the county as being an agricultural hub for Southern Ontario even by the middle of the 22nd century.

Clear Creek is home to the Hounds of Erie Winery, a dog-themed winery and cidery that specializes in cold-climate hybrid grapes. The winery has won many prestigious awards from various international wine awards, including the International Cold-Climate Wine Awards.

At least 105 species of bird have been discovered here from 1986 to 2019; including the Upland Sandpiper, the Scarlet Tanager, and the Yellow Warbler.

The nearest high school is Valley Heights Secondary School which is to the northeast. Students from here ride the same high school bus as the students from Houghton.

=== Cemetery ===
There are at least 247 individuals, or families, who have their remains buried at Clear Creek Cemetery. The cemetery is a United Empire Loyalist cemetery that includes veterans from the War of 1812, among others. Common last names found in the cemetery include Allen, Bates, Bauer, Becker, Brown, Crawford, and Fish. People were started to be buried at this cemetery during the 1830s.

=== Climate ===
Between the years 1897 and 1977, only the winter of 1975 was considered to be a mild winter for Southern Ontario communities along Lake Erie including Clear Creek.

From the late 1990s onwards, winters have become more mild due to changes in climate brought on by global warming. Clear Creek traditionally belongs to the humid continental climate zone, even with the recent mild winters and warmer dry summers.
