= Clear Creek (Mineral Fork tributary) =

Stream in the American state of Missouri

Coordinates: 38°05′11″N 90°46′39″W

Clear Creek is a stream in Washington County in the U.S. state of Missouri. It is a tributary of Mineral Fork.

Clear Creek was so named on account of its clear water.

== See also ==
- List of rivers of Missouri
