= Wheeler Creek (Grindstone Creek tributary) =

Stream in the US state of Missouri

Wheeler Creek is a stream in southeast DeKalb County in the U.S. state of Missouri. It is a tributary of Grindstone Creek.

The stream headwaters arise at 39°46′16″N 94°21′55″W approximately 1.5 miles north of Osborn. The stream flows to the northeast crossing under Missouri Route 33 and turns to the east and southeast reaching its confluence with Grindstone Creek four miles east-northeast of its origin at 39°46′52″N 94°17′17″W. The confluence is adjacent to Missouri Route C 3.5 miles northwest of Cameron.

Wheeler Creek, historically known as "Wheeler Branch", most likely was named after G. F. Wheeler, an early settler.

== See also ==
- List of rivers of Missouri
