= Clear Creek (Little Colorado River tributary) =

Waterway in Arizona

Coordinates: 34°59′19″N 110°38′23″W

Route of Clear Creek

Clear Creek drains the Mogollon Rim area of the state of Arizona. It flows through the Navajo Nation to Clear Creek Reservoir in Winslow, Arizona, and then to its confluence with the Little Colorado River. East Clear Creek is a tributary.

Dammed in the 1930s, the reservoir and canyon afford various recreational opportunities, including fishing, swimming, boating, cliff diving, and rock climbing.

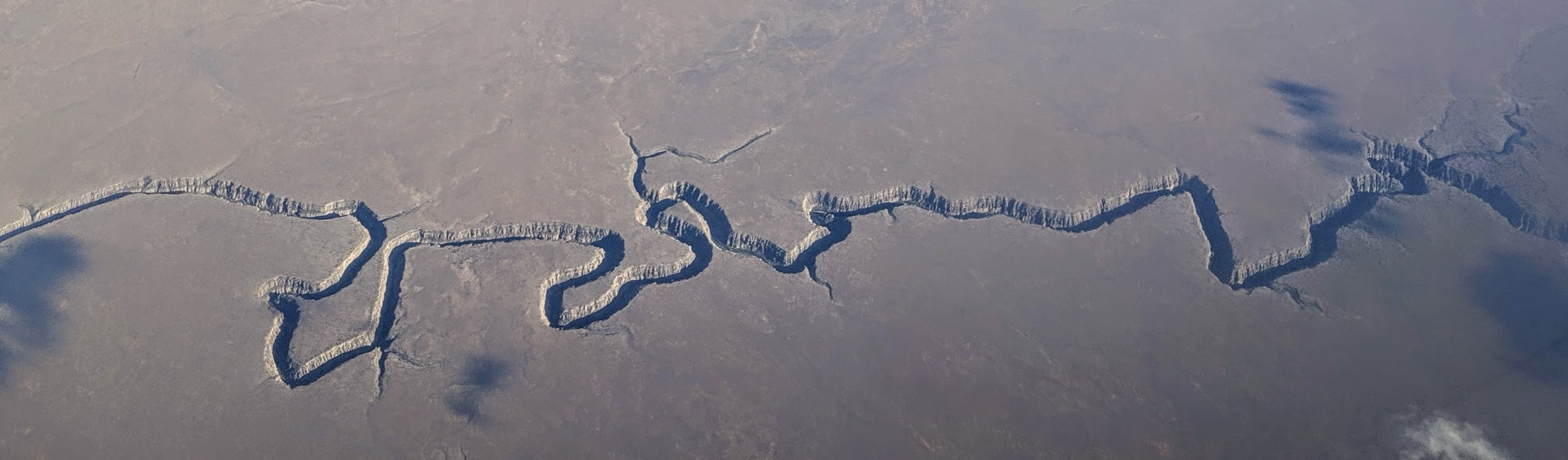
Clear Creek south of Winslow Arizona

== See also ==
- List of rivers of Arizona
