= Clear Creek (Little Bonne Femme Creek tributary) =

Stream in the U.S. state of Missouri

Coordinates: 38°52′41″N 92°19′41″W

Clear Creek is a stream in Boone County in the U.S. state of Missouri. It is a tributary of Little Bonne Femme Creek.

The confluence is south of Columbia within the boundary of the Rock Bridge Memorial State Park adjacent to Missouri Route 163.

Clear Creek was descriptively named on account of its clear water.

== See also ==
- List of rivers of Missouri
