= Clear Creek Reservoir =

Waterbody in Navajo County, Arizona, US

- Location within Arizona
- Location: Navajo County, Arizona, United States
- Coordinates: 34°58′19″N 110°38′29″W
- Type: reservoir
- Primary inflows: Clear Creek (East)
- Basin countries: United States
- Surface area: 45 acres (18 ha)
- Average depth: 13 ft (4.0 m)
- Surface elevation: 4,870 ft (1,480 m)
- Settlements: Winslow

Clear Creek Reservoir is located in the town of Winslow, Arizona, which is in Navajo County. It is fed by Clear Creek and drains to the Little Colorado River.

It is well-known for its Deep-water soloing. Many climbers come in summer to climb the steep red sandstone walls which line the reservoir and are best accessed via paddling.

== Fish species ==
- Rainbow trout – stocked once per year by Arizona Game and Fish Department
- Carp
- Sunfish
- Channel Catfish
- Largemouth Bass
