= Swank Creek =

Stream in Indiana, U.S.

Coordinates: 41°00′54″N 85°45′10″W

Swank Creek is a stream in the U.S. state of Indiana.

The origin of the namesake Swank is obscure.

== See also ==
- List of rivers of Indiana
