= Servia, Indiana =

- Unincorporated community and Census-designated place
- Location within Indiana Location within the United States
- Coordinates: 40°57′24″N 85°44′26″W
- Country: United States
- State: Indiana
- County: Wabash
- Township: Chester
- Elevation: 814 ft (248 m)
- Time zone: UTC-5 (Eastern (EST))
  - Summer (DST): UTC-4 (EDT)
- ZIP code: 46980
- FIPS code: 18-68742
- GNIS feature ID: 2830571

Servia is an unincorporated community in Chester Township, Wabash County, in the U.S. state of Indiana.

== History ==
An old variant name of the community was called New Madison. The meaning of the name Servia is obscure.

A post office was established under the name New Madison in 1866, was renamed to Servia in 1883, where it has been operating since.

== Demographics ==
Historical population
Census	Pop.	Note	%±
2023 (est.)	92

The United States Census Bureau defined Servia as a census designated place in the 2022 American Community Survey.
