= South Bend Branch =

Overview
- Locale: South Bend, Indiana to Logansport, Indiana
- Dates of operation: 1883–1974

Technical
- Track gauge: 4 ft 8 1/2 in (1,435 mm) standard gauge

The South Bend Branch was a Pennsylvania Railroad line that ran from South Bend, Indiana to Logansport, Indiana. The line was built in 1883 and was then a part of the Vandalia Railroad. The route was about 60 miles long and it passed through many towns.

== Stations ==
- South Bend
- Nutwood
- Lakeville
- Lapaz Junction
- Harris
- Plymouth
- Twin Lakes
- Hibbard
- Culver
- Delong
- Kewanna
- Grass Creek
- Lucurne
- Verona
- Logansport

== Industries served ==
The route was a very important link for Studebaker Auto since it ended at their factories in South Bend, Indiana. The line also had several grain elevators, which several are still in business. One of the reasons it was built was for people going to Lake Maxinkuckee in Culver, Indiana when it was a resort town.

== Abandonment ==
After Studebaker closed in 1963, rail traffic started declining and the last daily freights were gone by 1969. The first part of the line to go was between Nutwood and Culver, which was abandoned in 1973 and removed in 1974. The second piece to go was from Culver to Logansport which was abandoned in 1974 and removed in 1976. For a while in Plymouth, Indiana, they used the line for the old industrial park, but this rail was gone by 1990. Track still remains in South Bend, where it continues to be used by a couple of local businesses. However, that is all that remains of the old South Bend Branch.
