= Clear Creek (Daviess County, Missouri) =

Stream in the U.S. state of Missouri

Clear Creek is a stream in eastern Daviess County in the U.S. state of Missouri. It is a tributary of the Grand River.

The stream headwaters arise at 39°57′57″N 93°46′22″W approximately 1.5 miles east of Jamesport. The stream flows to the south meandering briefly into Livingston County in two places before turning to the south-southwest and crossing under Missouri Route 190 before reaching its confluence with the Grand River approximately 1.5 miles west of Lock Springs at 39°51′02″N 93°48′54″W.

Clear Creek most likely was named for the clarity of water.

== See also ==
- List of rivers of Missouri
