= Simonton Creek =

Stream in Indiana, U.S.

Coordinates: 41°01′02″N 85°44′40″W

Location
- Country: United States
- State: Indiana
- County: Wabash County, Indiana

Simonton Creek is a stream in the U.S. state of Indiana.

Simonton Creek was named after John Simonton, an early settler.

== See also ==
- List of rivers of Indiana
