= Clear Fork, Virginia =

Unincorporated community in Virginia, United States

- Unincorporated community
- Location within Virginia Location within the United States
- Coordinates: 37°12′43″N 81°11′14″W
- Country: United States
- State: Virginia
- County: Bland
- Elevation: 2,172 ft (662 m)
- Time zone: UTC-5 (Eastern (EST))
  - Summer (DST): UTC-4 (EDT)
- Area code: 276
- GNIS feature ID: 1492776

Clear Fork is an unincorporated community in Bland County, Virginia, United States. The community is located on Virginia State Route 61, 8.5 miles (13.7 km) north-northwest of Bland.
