= Clear Creek (Ioway Creek tributary) =

Stream in Boone and Story counties, Iowa

Coordinates: 42°02′10″N 93°38′56″W

Clear Creek is a stream in Boone and Story counties, Iowa, in the United States. It is a tributary to Ioway Creek, known as Squaw Creek until 2021.

Clear Creek was descriptively named on account of its clear water.
