= Clear Branch (Missouri River tributary) =

Stream in Missouri, U.S.

Coordinates: 38.66844°N 91.25778°W

Clear Branch is a stream in Warren County in the U.S. state of Missouri. It is a tributary of the Missouri River.

Clear Branch was named for the character of its clean water.

== See also ==
- List of rivers of Missouri
- Tributaries of the Missouri River
