= Beargrass Creek (Indiana) =

Stream in Indiana, United States of America

Coordinates: 40°56′38″N 85°53′38″W

Beargrass Creek is a stream in the U.S. state of Indiana. It is a tributary of the Eel River.

Beargrass Creek was so named on account of wild grass which was a food source of bears.

== See also ==
- List of rivers of Indiana
