= Pony Creek (Indiana) =

Stream in Indiana, U.S.

Coordinates: 40°59′33″N 85°46′24″W

Pony Creek is a stream in the U.S. state of Indiana.

According to tradition, Pony Creek was named for pony thieves who operated near the creek.

== See also ==
- List of rivers of Indiana
