= East Clear Creek =

Stream in Navajo County, Arizona

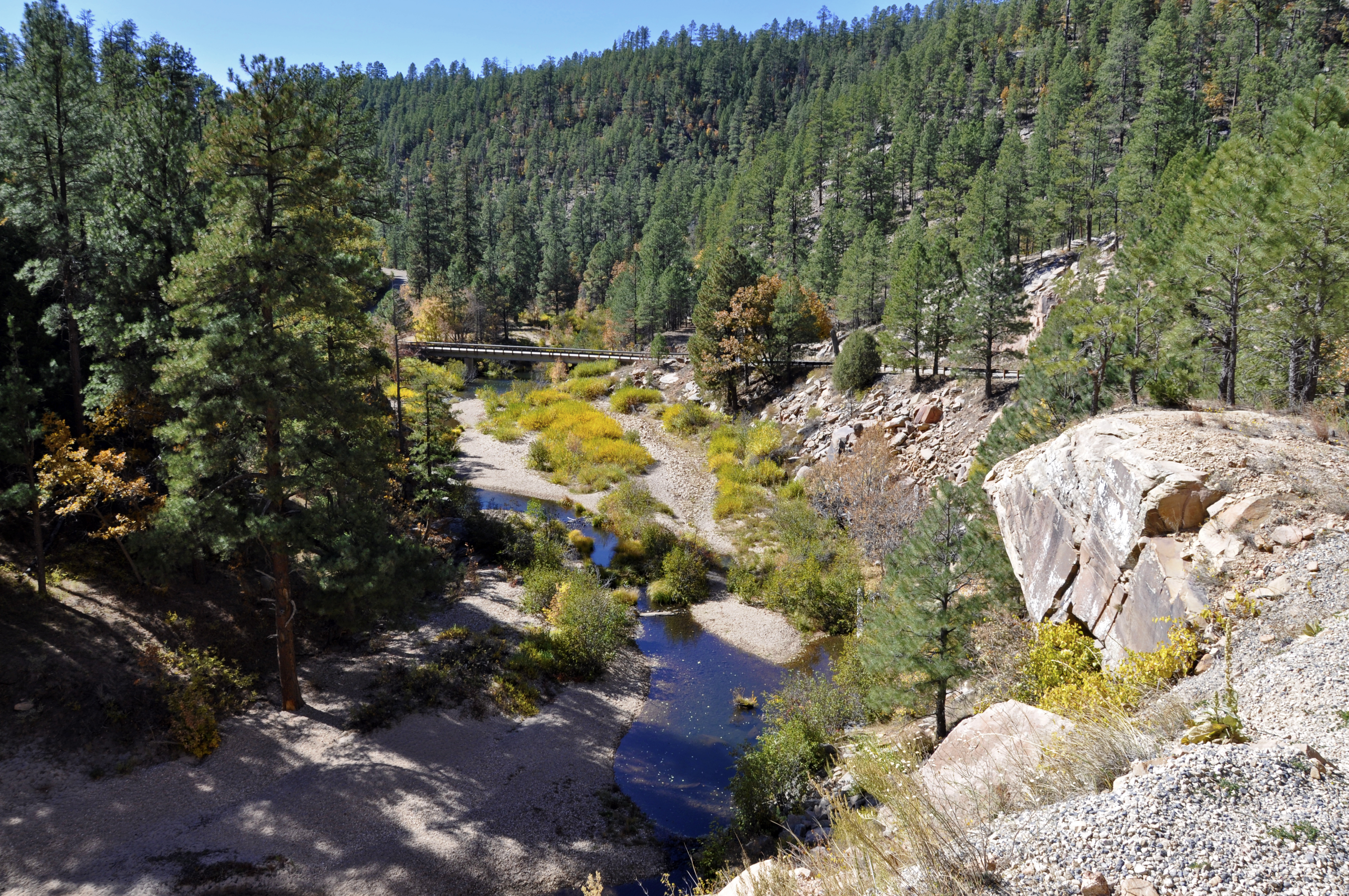
- East Clear Creek at Forest Road 95

Location
- Country: United States
- State: Arizona

Physical characteristics
- Source
  - elevation: 6,800 ft (2,100 m)

East Clear Creek is located in the Mogollon Rim area of the state of Arizona. The closest town Winslow is 45 miles (72 km) away.

Kinder Crossing on the creek derived its name from Runyon C. Kinder, who herded sheep in the area during the 1880s. The crossing lends its name to Kinder Crossing Trail, a hiking route along the creek. Other crossings with trails include Horse Crossing, Jones Crossing and Mack Crossing.

== Location ==
Mouth
Confluence with Clear Creek (Little Colorado River tributary), Coconino County, Arizona: 34°37′25″N 111°02′22″W
Source
Coconino County, Arizona: 34°27′55″N 111°20′27″W

== Fish species ==
- Rainbow Trout
- Brown Trout
- Brook Trout

== General information ==
- Fishable miles: 34
