= Clear Creek (Eel River tributary) =

Stream in Indiana, U.S.

Coordinates: 40°59′48″N 85°48′38″W

Clear Creek is a stream in the U.S. state of Indiana. It is a tributary of the Eel River.

Clear Creek was named because of the character of its water.

== See also ==
- List of rivers of Indiana
