= Wheeler Creek (Eel River tributary) =

Stream in Indiana, U.S.

Coordinates: 41°02′49″N 85°43′23″W

Wheeler Creek is a stream in the U.S. state of Indiana. It is a tributary of Eel River.

The namesake of Wheeler Creek is unknown.

== See also ==
- List of rivers of Indiana
