= Vandalia Railroad (1905–1917) =

Railway line in the United States

Overview
- Locale: Indiana; Illinois
- Dates of operation: 1905–1916
- Predecessor: St. Louis, Vandalia & Terre Haute Railroad, Terre Haute & Indianapolis Railroad, Terre Haute & Logansport Railway, Logansport & Toledo Railway, and Indiana & Vincennes Railroad.
- Successor: Pittsburgh, Cincinnati, Chicago and St. Louis Railway

Technical
- Track gauge: 4 ft 8 1/2 in (1,435 mm) standard gauge

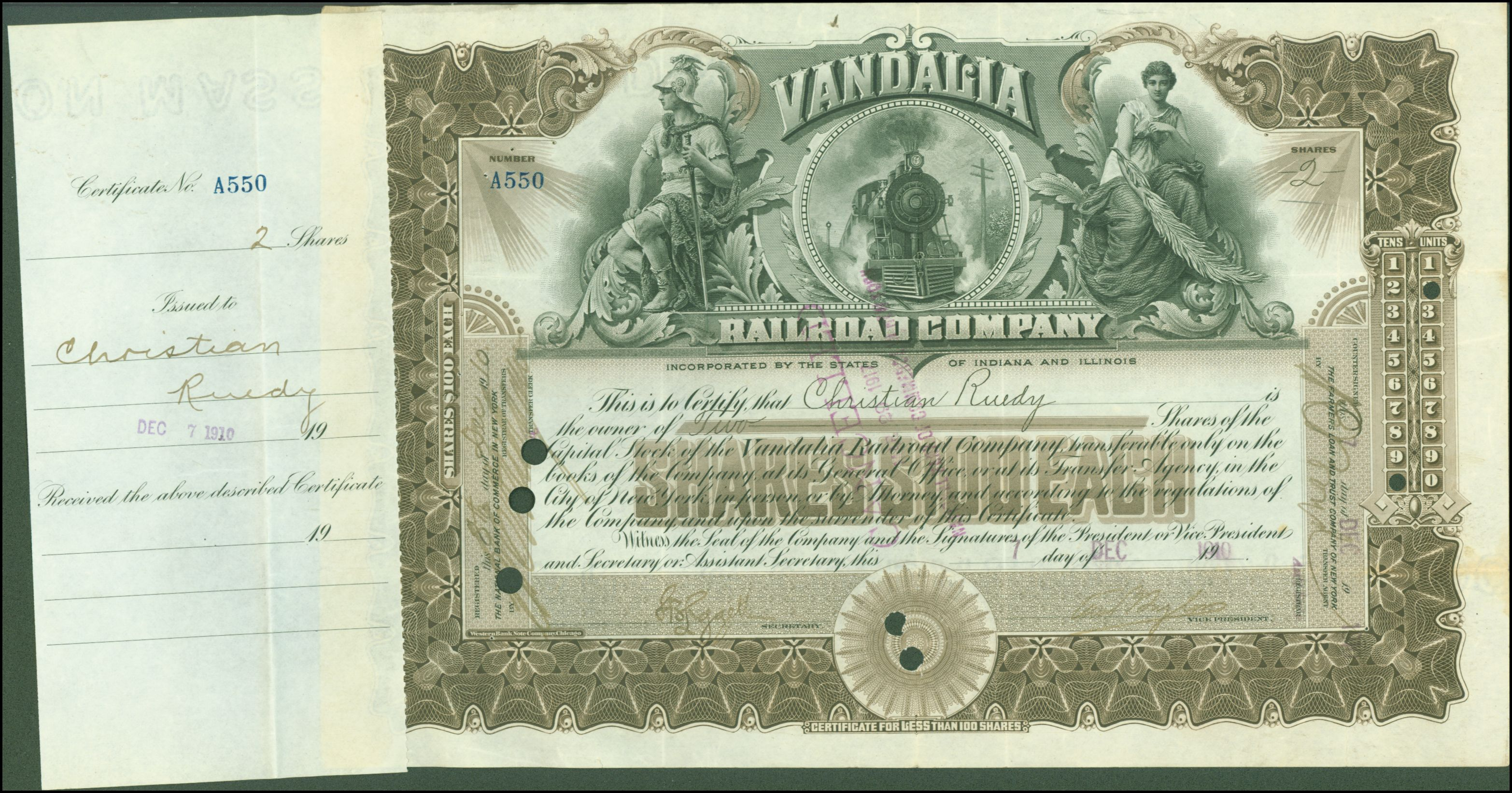
Share of the Vandalia Railroad Company, issued 7. December 1910

The Vandalia Railroad Company was incorporated January 1, 1905, by a merger of several lines in Indiana and Illinois that formed a 471-mile railroad consisting of lines mostly west of Indianapolis.

On January 1, 1917, the Pittsburgh, Cincinnati, Chicago and St. Louis Railway (the Panhandle) which the Pennsylvania Railroad (PRR) had acquired in 1868, was merged into the Vandalia Railroad to form the Pittsburgh, Cincinnati, Chicago and St. Louis Railroad. This gave the PRR a direct route from New York City to St. Louis. In 1968, PRR merged with the New York Central (NYC) to become Penn Central (PC) and in 1976, becoming part of Conrail (CR). Much of the north–south line was abandoned with the Conrail formation but parts of the east–west line survive as part of CSX Transportation.

== The Vandalia Railroad lineage ==
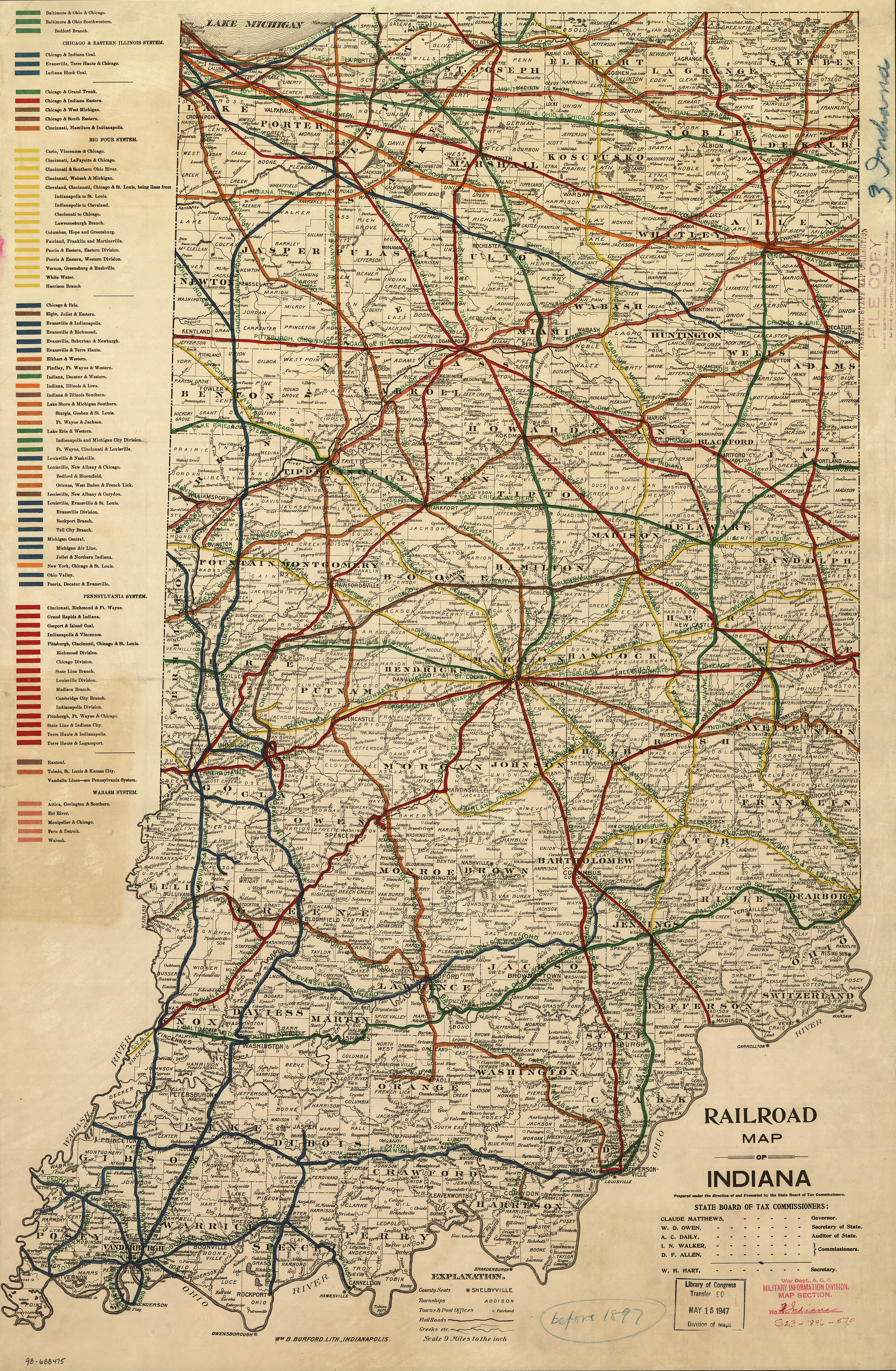
1896 Railroad map of Indiana. Detailed township and county map distinguishing railroads by color and name. Includes a list of railroads in left margin, coded by color.

=== Terre Haute and Richmond ===
The Terre Haute and Richmond Railroad was chartered in January 1847, with construction starting in late 1849. In February 1852, 73 mi (117 km) of track between Indianapolis and Terre Haute were completed. On March 6, 1865, the name was changed to the Terre Haute & Indianapolis Railroad. On April 26, 1870, an extension was finished from Terre Haute to the Illinois state line that met up with the St. Louis, Vandalia and Terre Haute. Chauncey Rose of Terre Haute served as promoter of this railroad and was its first President.

=== Indianapolis and Vincennes ===
The Indianapolis and Vincennes was originally promoted as a route to the Gulf of Mexico when construction started in 1867, with the Indianapolis, Cincinnati and Lafayette Railroad providing financial help in return for a lease on the line. A.E. Burnside, major General in the Union Army during the Civil War, was an early promoter of the railroad. In 1868, two Pennsylvania Railroad (PRR) companies were also added as guarantors for the line. The line was completed between its namesake cities in 1869, with the PRR taking control in 1871. The line, however, never reached the Gulf of Mexico as its promoters had planned.

=== Terre Haute and Logansport ===
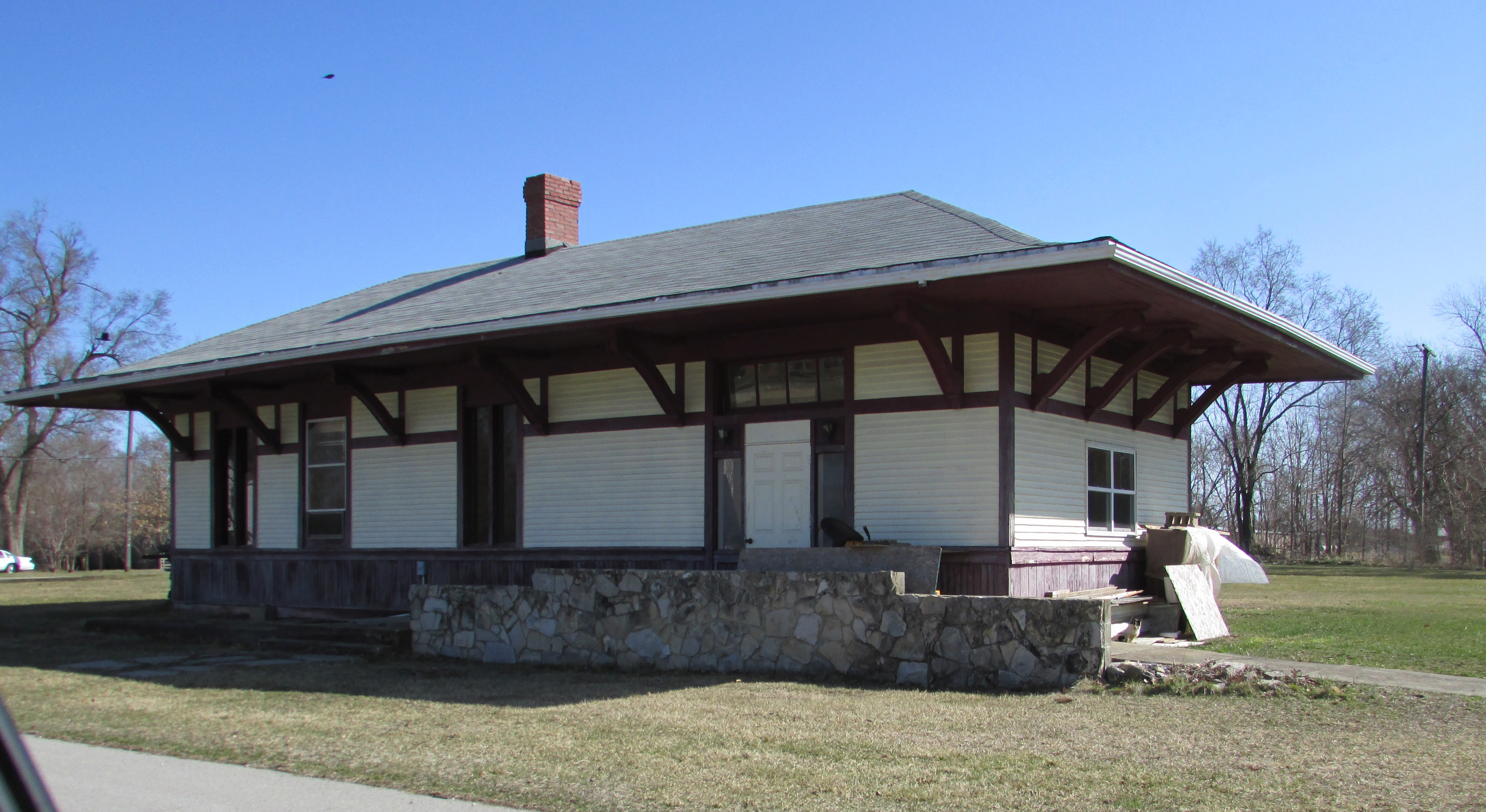
A former Vandalia train depot in Kewanna, Indiana.

In 1871, the initial section of the Terre Haute and Logansport Railroad connected Rockville, Crawfordsville, Frankfort, and Clymers, Indiana, which is six miles (9.7 km) southwest of Logansport. The railroad used trackage rights on a Wabash Railroad predecessor for four years until they built their own tracks into Logansport. The Terre Haute and Logansport then leased the 23 miles (37 km) segment of the Evansville and Crawfordsville Railroad that stretched from Rockville to Terre Haute in 1872.

The Terre Haute and Logansport finished a 69 miles (111 km) line in 1884, that connected Logansport with South Bend. This line was also leased to the Terre Haute and Indianapolis, which in 1890, leased the Indiana and Lake Michigan Railway, giving it access to St. Joseph, Michigan.

=== Detroit, Eel River and Illinois ===
Completed in 1874, between Logansport and Butler, Indiana, the Detroit, Eel River and Illinois had been planned as a farm-to-market road. The Wabash, St. Louis and Pacific leased the line in 1879, to complete the middle link of a St. Louis–East Coast line. The lease was canceled after a long legal battle. The line was later reorganized as the Logansport and Toledo Railway and was bought by the Pennsylvania Railroad in 1901.

== Merger ==
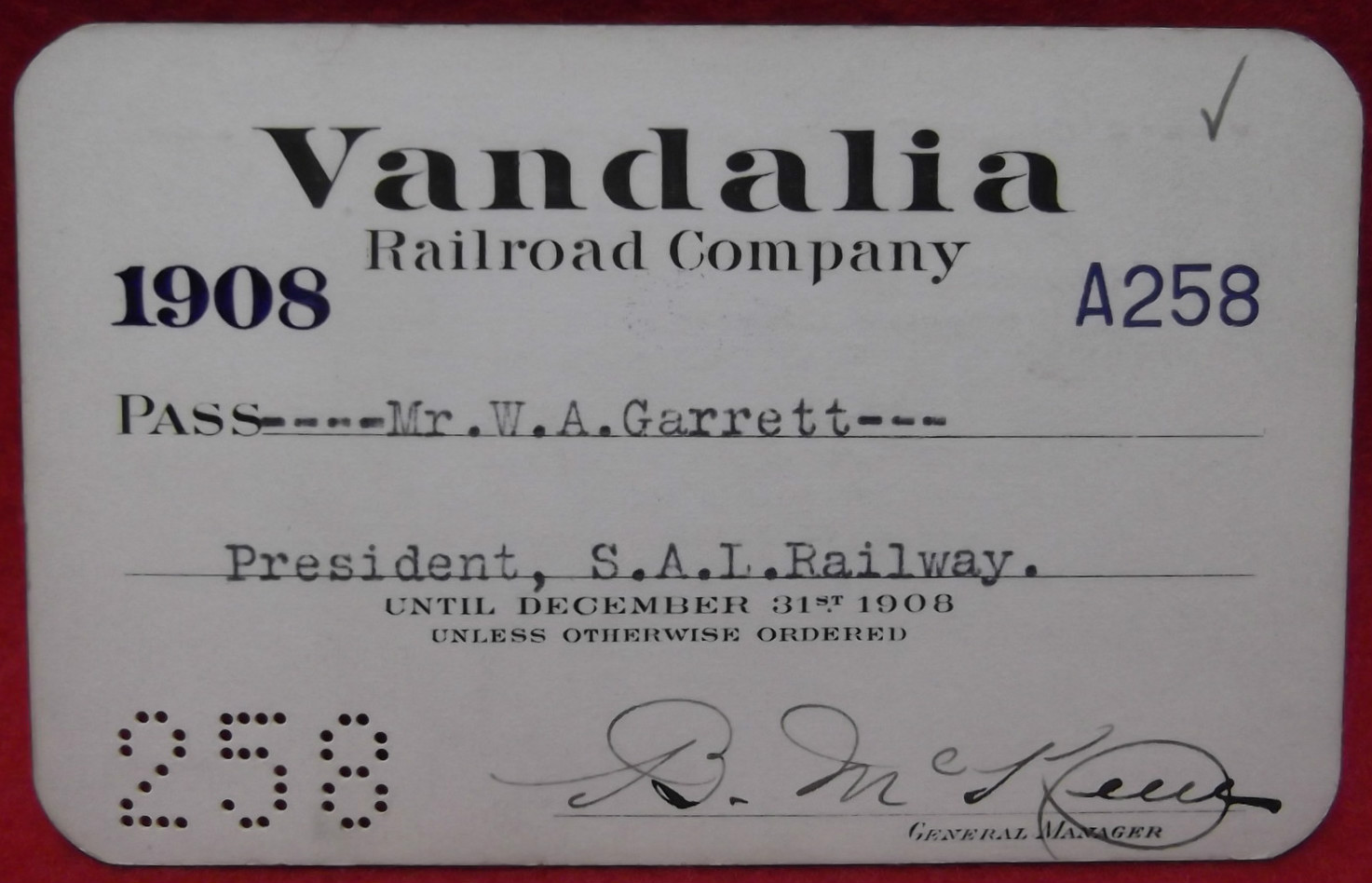
Vandalia Railroad pass (1908)

The Terre Haute & Indianapolis Railroad, the St. Louis, Vandalia & Terre Haute Railroad, the Terre Haute & Logansport Railway, the Logansport & Toledo Railway, the Indiana & Vincennes Railroad were all merged on January 1, 1905, to form the Vandalia Railroad Company. The railroad connected Indianapolis in the east with St. Louis in the west and South Bend and Butler in the north with Vincennes in the south.

== Routes ==
The main east–west line ran from Indianapolis to St. Louis, with a major branch, the Terre Haute & Peoria Railroad, connecting Decatur, and Peoria, Illinois. The line was double-tracked for much of its length, serving the coal region of southern Illinois, and as a passenger route for the Pennsylvania Railroad's Blue Ribbon named trains, The St Louisan, the Jeffersonian, and the Spirit of St. Louis.

The main north–south route ran from Terre Haute to Logansport and then to on to South Bend. Logansport was a PRR hub, with six branch lines radiating in all directions. Logansport also featured a yard and engine terminal. From Logansport, the line proceeded northward intersecting every major east–west trunk line including the PRR's main east–west route and PRR's "panhandle" route. Upon reaching South Bend, the line proceeded northward through an industrial corridor toward the Studebaker plant to a depot just short of South Bend Union Station. Because the New York Central (NYC) trackage was elevated, interchange with NYC and tenant Grand Trunk Western (GTW) was indirect via a west-routed branch that reached the Studebaker plant railroad, New Jersey, Indiana, and Illinois (NJI&I) subsidiary of the Wabash Railroad, GTW, and NYC's Kankakee Belt Railroad subsidiary. PRR maintained few facilities other than the depot in town as there were no other connecting PRR lines in South Bend.

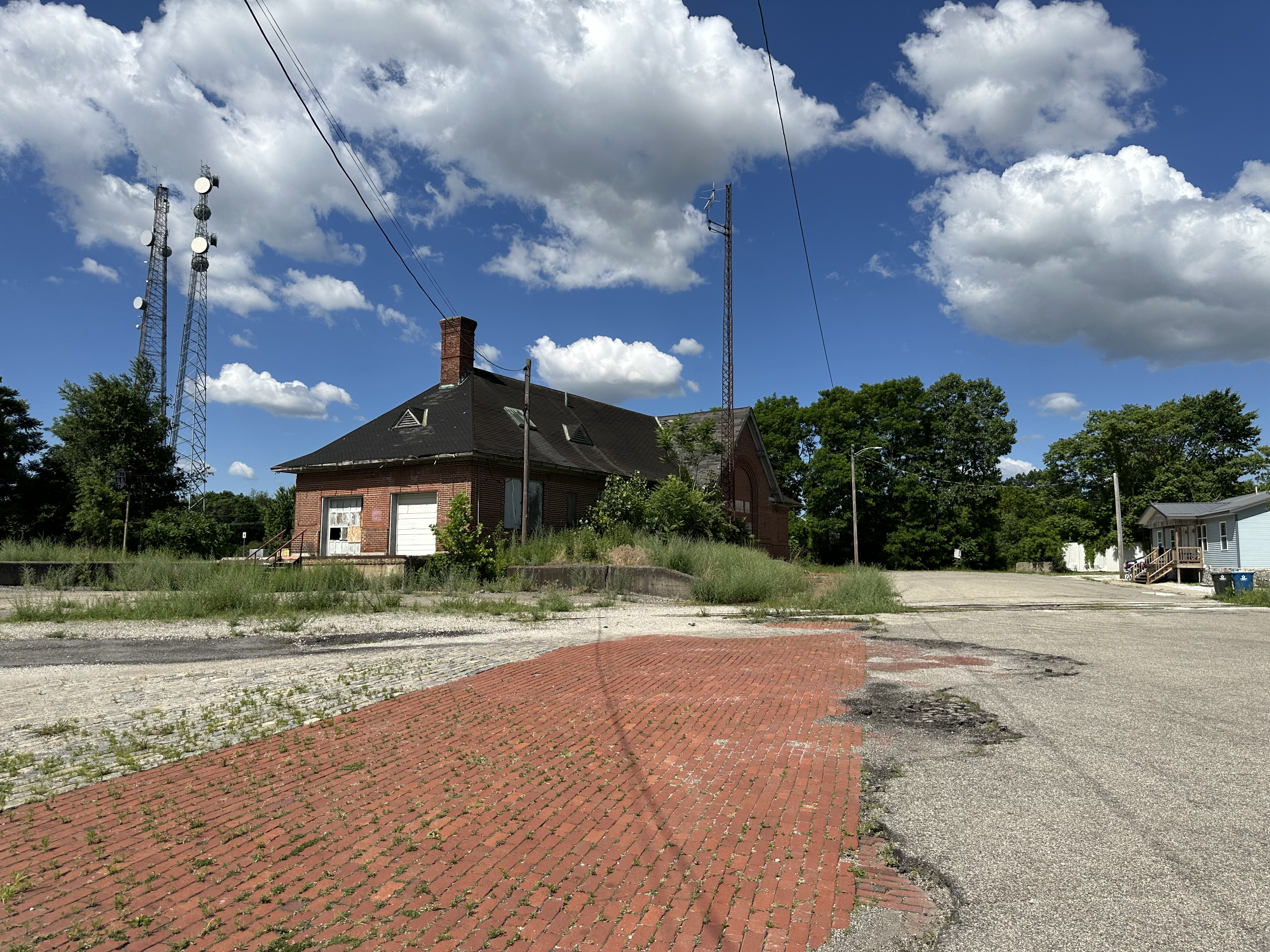
The former PRR depot in Plymouth, IN, that served the PRR Vandalia Line to South Bend as well as the PRR mainline to Chicago

From Logansport, the Logansport & Toledo Railway proceeded northeast to Butler, where it connected to the Lake Shore and Michigan Southern Railway.

== Equipment ==
The Vandalia Railroad was a PRR subsidiary for most of the twentieth century. PRR was known for equipment standardization and as such, all properties and subsidiaries operated with standardized PRR equipment.

== Traffic ==
Freight traffic was the primary use of the Vandalia Railroad. Studebaker loaded trucks for shipment south. Passenger trains were operated, including football specials for the University of Notre Dame. The university is located a few miles north of the station.

== Abandonment ==
Despite the shutdown of most Studebaker operations in South Bend in December 1963, abandonment was delayed until the Conrail consolidation. At that time, Conrail had three routes to/through South Bend and the Vandalia Railroad was deemed redundant. It has been abandoned piecemeal from the city border northward, with online industries served from trains based on the former NYC territory.

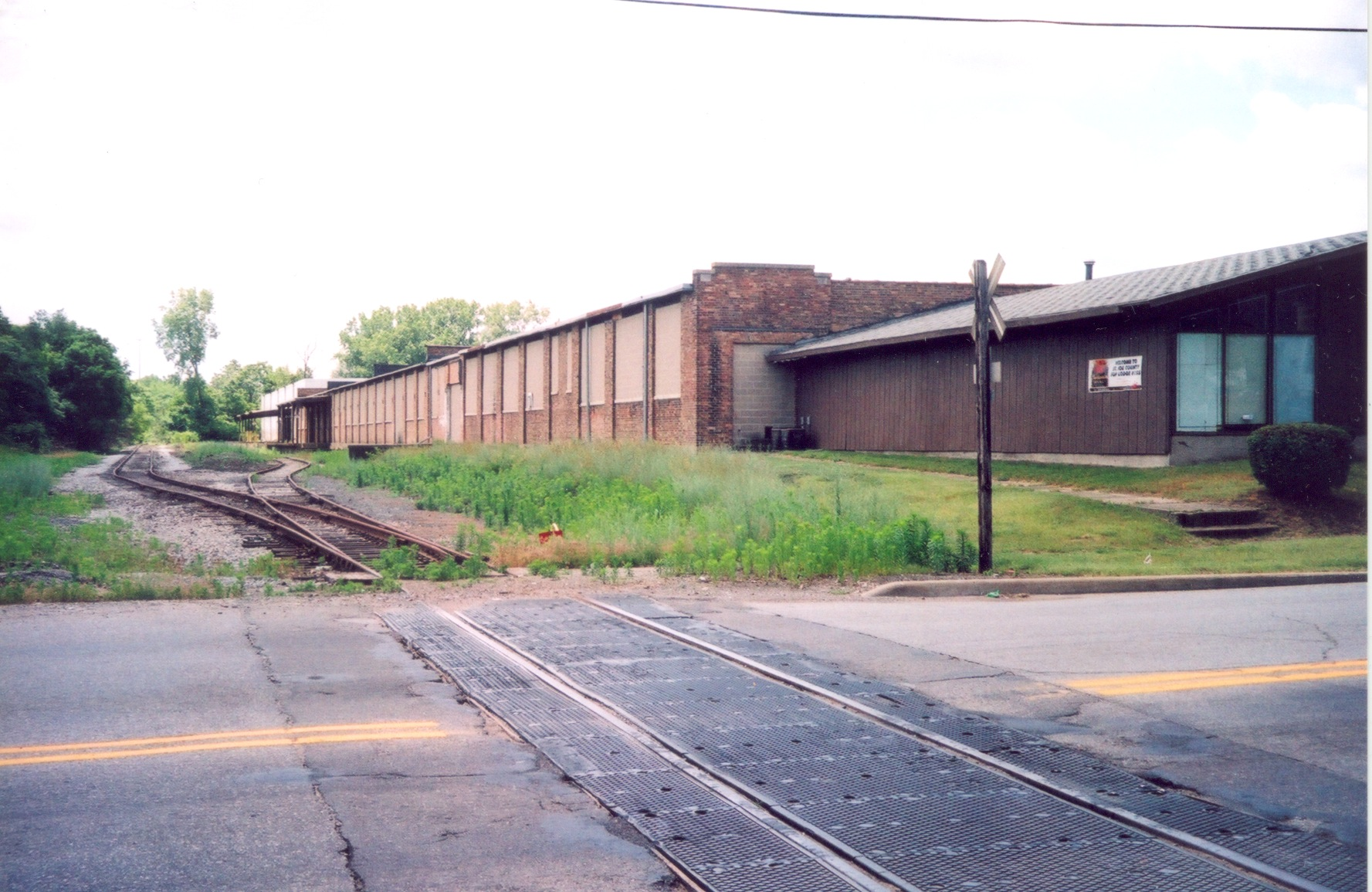

Into the 2000s a remannt of the Vandalia Line and its connection to the former NYC tracks on the west were retained in South Bend to just past Ewing Avenue by Norfolk Southern to service Hanson Cold Storage. In 2014 NS formally abandoned it and the tracks were taken up as NS.

From 1985 to 1990 a short segment of the PRR Vandalia line to South Bend in Plymouth, IN, was operated as the Plymouth Short Line (PSLL).

== Remnants ==
The depot in South Bend still stands as a business. The former spur to Hanson Storage just south of Ewing Avenue that came off the Vandalia line is still in place.

The depot in Plymouth, IN, which served both the Vandalia Line to South Bend as well as the PRR mainline to Chicago is still in place and owned by CSX. A short piece of connecting track between the two lines is embedded in the pavement.

A short piece of track is left in place just north of Chippewa Avenue in South Bend that formerly connected the PRR line to another Studebaker plant on the city's south side. In later years, it was used by AM General and serviced by Penn Central and Conrail.

== See also ==
- Pennsylvania Railroad
- List of Pennsylvania Railroad lines west of Pittsburgh
- Pennsylvania Company, holding company incorporated in 1870 to own and operate much of the Lines West of Pittsburgh
- List of Pennsylvania Railroad predecessor railroads
- Conrail - successor to Penn Central from 1976
- CSX Transportation - owner of remnants of the Vandalia

== Bibliography ==
- Simmons, Richard S.; Parker, Francis H. (1997). Railroads of Indiana. Indiana University Press. ISBN 0-253-33351-2.
- Walsh, Joe (1999). Penny streamliners: the Blue Ribbon Fleet. Kalmbach Publishing Co. ISBN 0-89024-293-3.
- Staufer, Alvin F.; Edson, D. William; Harley, E. Thomas (1993). Pennsy Power lll. Staufer. ISBN 0-944513-10-7.
